= Kells, Dumfries and Galloway =

Coordinates: 55.0807°N 4.1445°W

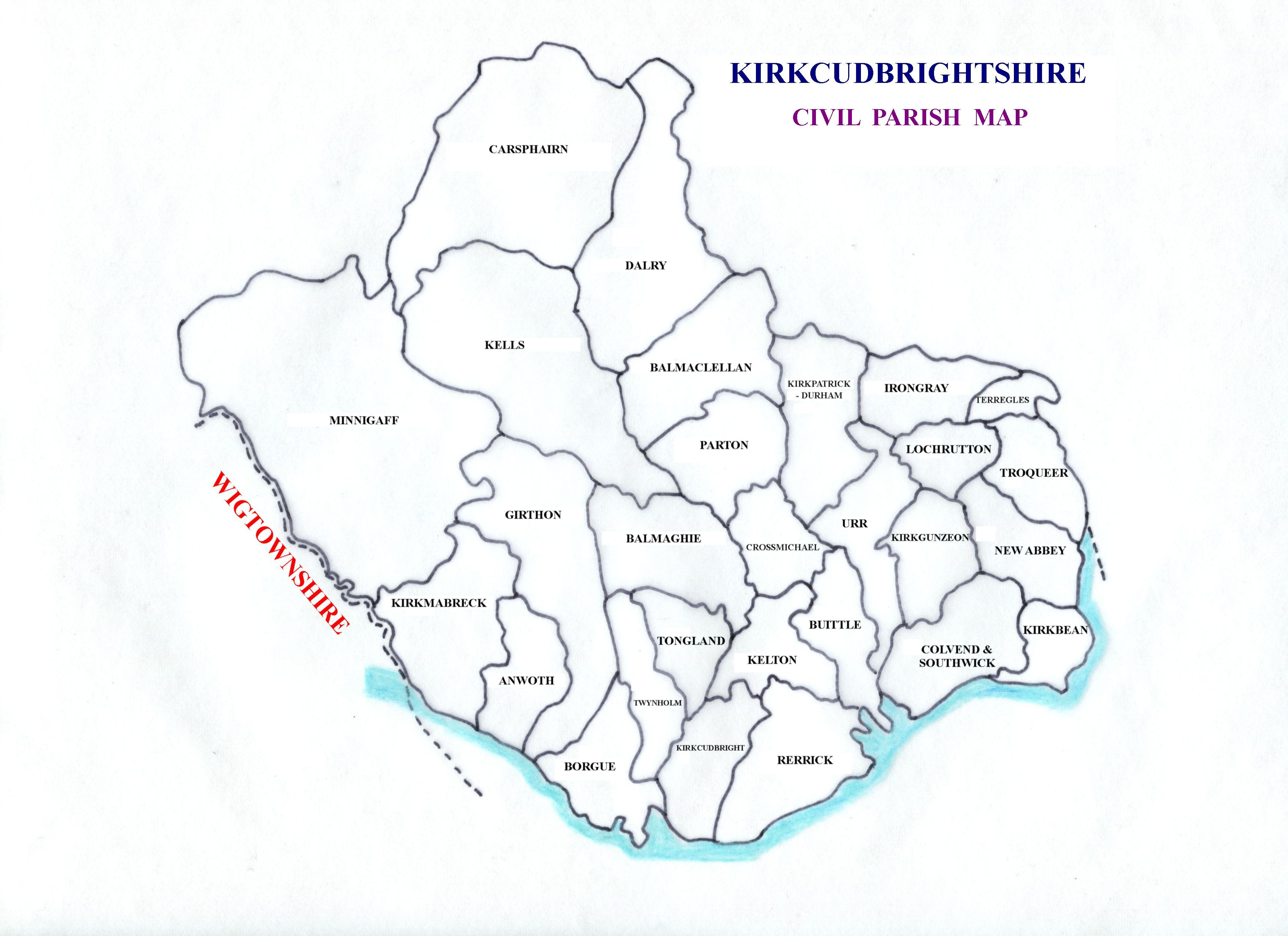

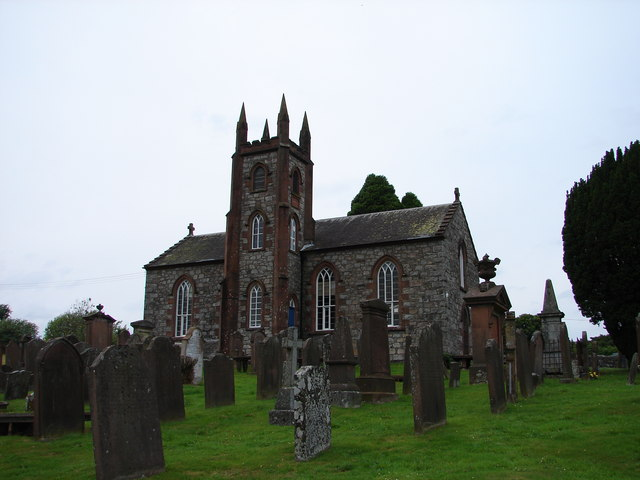
Kells Parish Church

Kells parish, in the Stewartry of Kirkcudbright in Scotland, is located 14 miles (NWbN) from Castle-Douglas, and 19 miles (NbW) from Kirkcudbright. It contains, with the burgh of New Galloway, 1121 inhabitants.

== History and description ==
Kells parish is supposed by some to derive its name from its elevated situation, of which, in the Gaelic language, the word is descriptive; others deduce it from the British Cell, on account of the extensive woods formerly existing here, and of which considerable remains are still found embedded in the various mosses. The parish, which is one of the largest in the county, is bounded on the west and south by the river Dee, which separates it from the parishes of Minnigaff, Girthon, and Balmaghie; and on the east by the river Ken, which divides it from Dalry, Balmaclellan, and Parton. It is about sixteen miles in length and eight miles in breadth, comprising an area of 47,500 acres, of which most is mountain pasture, and, with the exception of about 400 acres of woodland and plantations, the remainder is arable and in good cultivation. The surface is irregularly broken, rising towards the north into a range of lofty mountains, including the heights of Galloway, of which some have an elevation of 2700 feet above the sea. The arable lands, which are chiefly along the banks of the Ken, and interspersed with copses of oak and birch. The lower grounds are watered by numerous rivulets, which intersect the parish in various directions, and form tributaries to the Dee and to the Ken. The Ken has its source on the confines of Dumfriesshire, and, after entering the parish on the north-east, receives the waters of the Deuch, and at the southern extremity unites with the Dee. There are also many lakes, of which those of Loch Dungeon and Loch Harrow, in the north, are of considerable extent, but both inferior to Loch Ken, on the eastern border of the parish, which is about five miles in length and three quarters of a mile in breadth.

The soil of the lands along the Ken is a rich clay, producing good crops of oats. The hills in the parish are chiefly of granite: there are neither mines nor quarries of any description. The remains of ancient wood are principally copses of oak and birch, both of which are indigenous, and appear well adapted to the soil; and the plantations, which are of recent formation, consist of oak, intermixed with Scotch fir and larch, and are well managed. Kenmure Castle, the seat of Lord Viscount Kenmure, the principal landed proprietor, is a very ancient structure, is seated on a circular mount, at the head of Loch Ken, within a mile of the town of New Galloway, and is supposed to have been the residence of John Balliol. It suffered frequent assaults during the wars with England in the time of Edward I; and was burnt in the reign of Mary, Queen of Scots, and again during the usurpation of Cromwell. The estate subsequently belonged to the Gordons, of Lochinvar, of whom Sir John was created Lord of Lochinvar and Viscount Kenmure, in 1633; but it became forfeited to the crown in the time of William, the sixth viscount, who was attainted for his participation in the rebellion of 1715, and beheaded on Tower Hill, London, in the following year. The property was, however, purchased from the crown by a member of his family; and the title was restored by act of parliament, in 1824, to his grandson, the late viscount and proprietor. The grounds are embellished with stately timber and thriving plantations, and the approach to the castle is by an avenue of lime trees.

Glenlee is a mansion, which has been greatly enlarged, and is situated on the banks of the Ken, in a park embellished with many large oak trees.

The church, erected in 1822, is a structure in the early English style of architecture, with a square embattled tower; it contains 560 sittings, and can be made to hold a greater number. The Glenkens Society annually award prizes to the most deserving of the scholars. A school-house was erected in the early 19th century in the northern part of the parish, by Mr. Kennedy, of Knocknalling, who paid the salary of the master; and there was also a Sabbath school, to which had attached a good library. The poor were partly supported by the interest of £522 bequeathed by various individuals, in the hands of the Kirk Session. There are several chalybeate springs in the parish, of which one, on Cairn-Edward, about two miles from New Galloway, was formerly in great repute, and is still used by the inhabitants in its neighbourhood.

== Notable residents ==
Among the natives of the parish have been the poet John Lowe, 1750-98, the author of Mary's Dream; Robert Heron, author of a History of Scotland; Thomas Gordon, the translator of Tacitus; and the Rev. William Gillespie, author of the Progress of Refinement, of Consolation, and other works. The tiny parish has produced three Moderators:

- Very Rev Dr Nathaniel Paterson Moderator of the General Assembly of the Free Church of Scotland in 1850/51.
- Very Rev James Maitland Moderator of the General Assembly of the Church of Scotland in 1860
- Very Rev Thomas Nicol Moderator of the General Assembly of the Church of Scotland in 1914

== See also ==
- List of listed buildings in Kells, Dumfries and Galloway

== Notes ==
This article incorporates text from A topographical dictionary of Scotland, by Samuel Lewis, an 1846 publication now in the public domain.
