= List of listed buildings in Balmaclellan, Dumfries and Galloway =

This is a list of listed buildings in the parish of Balmaclellan, Dumfries and Galloway, Scotland.

== List ==
Name	Location	Date Listed	Grid Ref. (Note: Sometimes known as OSGB36, the grid reference (where provided) is based on the British national grid reference system used by the Ordnance Survey. • "Guide to National Grid". Ordnance Survey. • "Get-a-map". Ordnance Survey.)	Geo-coordinates	Notes	LB Number (Note: Historic Environment Scotland assign a unique alphanumeric identifier to each designated site in Scotland, for listed buildings this always begins with "LB", for example "LB12345".)	Image
Ken Bridge				55°04′52″N 4°07′52″W	Category A	3316	Upload another image See more images
Balmaclellan, Glenview				55°05′17″N 4°06′52″W	Category C(S)	3308	Upload Photo
Troquhain Sundial				55°05′30″N 4°04′05″W	Category B	3317	Upload Photo
Balmaclellan Church And Churchyard, Including Crimean War Memorial And Boundary Walls				55°05′17″N 4°06′51″W	Category B	51352	Upload Photo
Holm Lodge				55°05′22″N 4°07′11″W	Category B	3312	Upload Photo
Holm House				55°05′34″N 4°07′27″W	Category B	3311	Upload Photo
Holm House 2 Pairs Of Gatepiers				55°05′32″N 4°07′18″W	Category B	3313	Upload Photo
Barscobe Castle				55°06′07″N 4°06′08″W	Category A	3310	Upload Photo
Ironmacannie Mill				55°03′16″N 4°05′17″W	Category A	3315	Upload another image See more images

== Key ==
The scheme for classifying buildings in Scotland is:

- Category A: "buildings of national or international importance, either architectural or historic; or fine, little-altered examples of some particular period, style or building type."
- Category B: "buildings of regional or more than local importance; or major examples of some particular period, style or building type, which may have been altered."
- Category C: "buildings of local importance; lesser examples of any period, style, or building type, as originally constructed or moderately altered; and simple traditional buildings which group well with other listed buildings."

In March 2016 there were 47,288 listed buildings in Scotland. Of these, 8% were Category A, and 50% were Category B, with the remaining 42% being Category C.
