= The Glenkens =

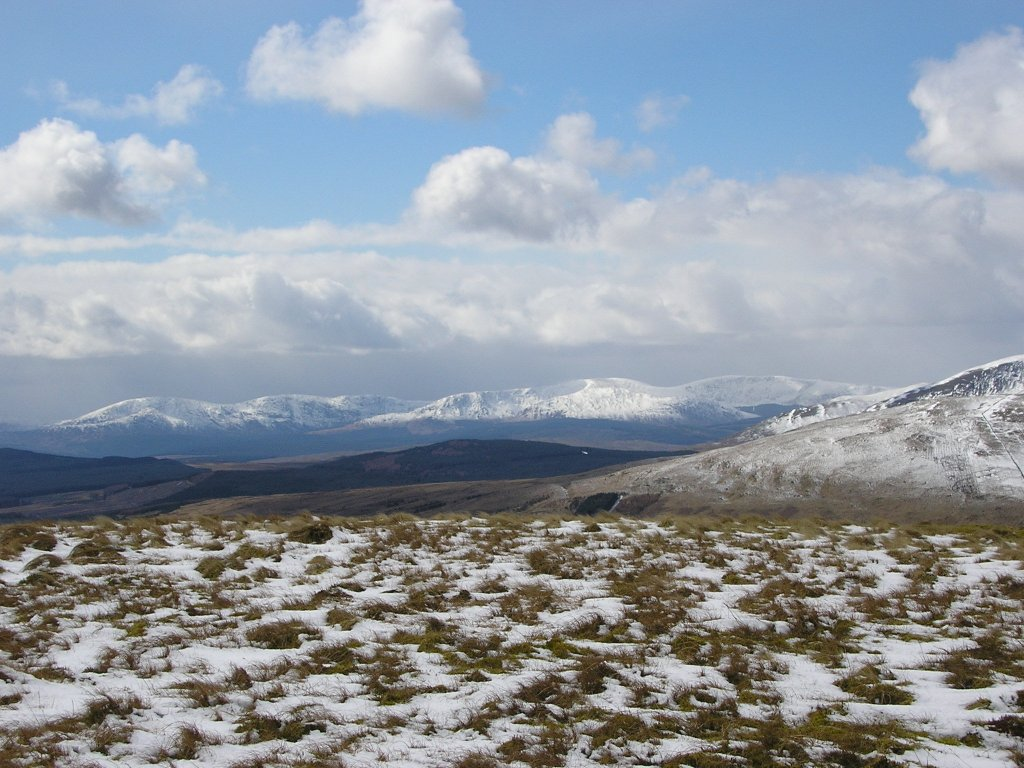
Mirk Side, with The Glenkens in the background

The Glenkens (Scottish Gaelic: An Gleann Cain) is located midway along the western section of the Southern Upland way in the historic county of Kirkcudbrightshire in Galloway, Scotland. The Glenkens is made up of the parishes of Carsphairn, Dalry, Kells, Parton and Balmaclellan. The name comes from the Water of Ken river which runs through the valley before flowing into the River Dee and then down to the sea.
