= Tarff railway station =

Disused railway station in Ringford, Dumfries and Galloway

Tarff
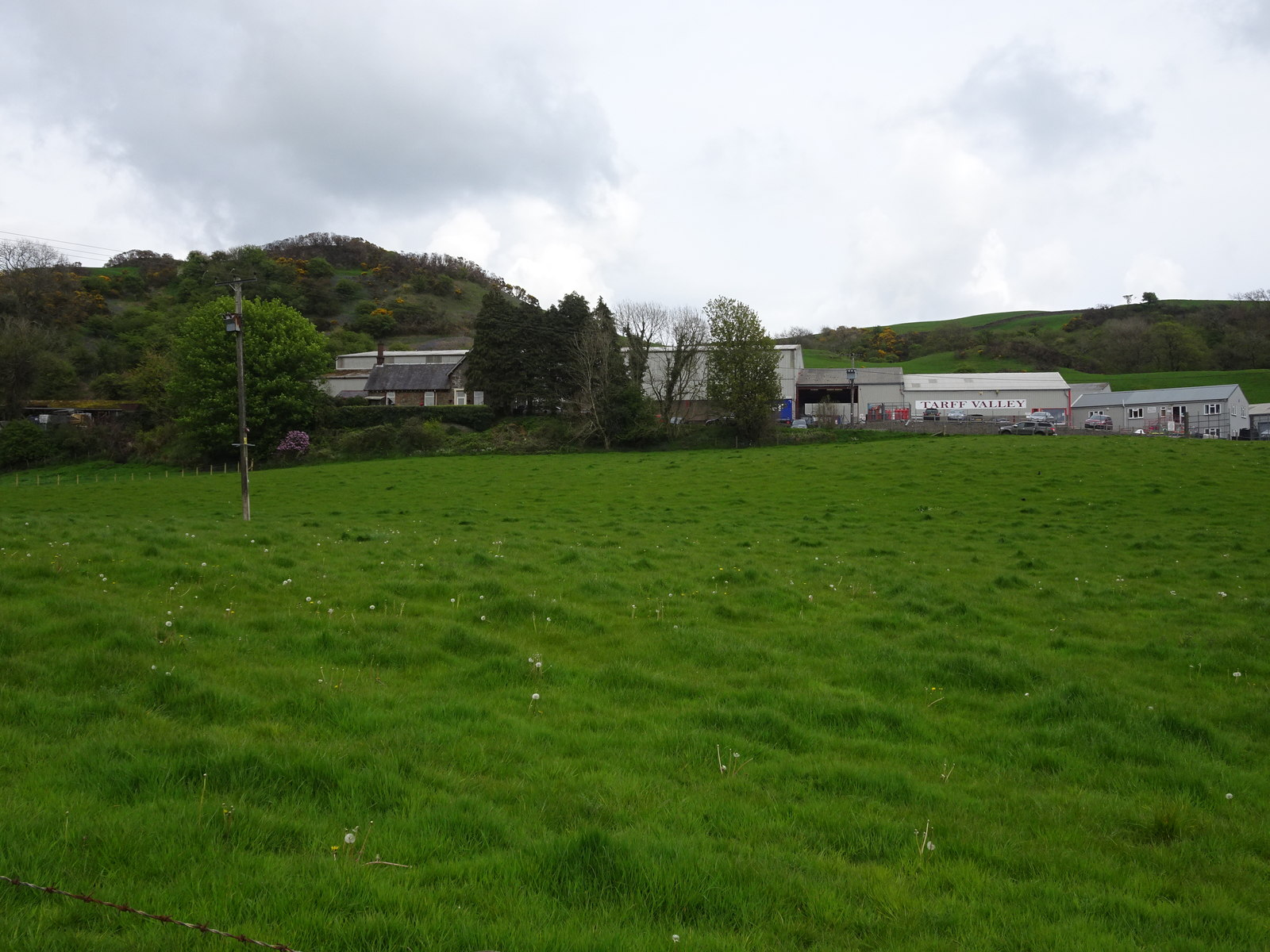
- The site of the station in 2019

General information
- Location: Ringford, Dumfries and Galloway; England
- Coordinates: 54.88520°N 4.05035°W
- Grid reference: NX685564
- Platforms: 1

Other information
- Status: Disused

History
- Original company: Glasgow and South Western Railway
- Pre-grouping: Glasgow and South Western Railway
- Post-grouping: London, Midland and Scottish Railway; British Rail (Scottish Region)

Key dates
- 7 March 1864: Opened as Tarff for Gatehouse
- 1 September 1865: Name changed to Gatehouse
- 1 August 1871: Name changed to Tarff
- 3 May 1965: Closed
Location

Tarff railway station served the village of Ringford, in the historic county of Kirkcudbrightshire in the administrative area of Dumfries and Galloway, Scotland from 1864 to 1965 on the Kirkcudbright Railway.

== History ==
The station opened on 7 March 1864 as Tarff for Gatehouse by the Glasgow and South Western Railway. To the east was the goods yard and to the north was the signal box, which opened in 1882. The goods yard had a siding and a stone goods shed. The name of the station was changed to Gatehouse on 1 September 1865 and then changed to Tarff on 1 August 1871. The signal box closed in 1946 and was replaced by ground frames. The station closed to both passengers and goods traffic on 3 May 1965.

| Preceding station | Disused railways | Following station |
|---|---|---|
| Bridge of Dee; Line and station closed | Kirkcudbright Railway | Kirkcudbright; Line and station closed |
