= Castle Douglas St Andrew Street railway station =

Disused railway station in Castle Douglas, Dumfries and Galloway

Castle Douglas St Andrew Street

General information
- Location: Castle Douglas, Kirkcudbrightshire; Scotland
- Coordinates: 54.9394°N 3.9327°W
- Grid reference: NX762622
- Platforms: 1

Other information
- Status: Disused

History
- Original company: Glasgow and South Western Railway
- Pre-grouping: Glasgow and South Western Railway

Key dates
- 7 March 1864: Opened
- 1 December 1867: Closed
Location

Castle Douglas St Andrew Street railway station served the town of Castle Douglas, in the historic county of Kirkcudbrightshire in the administrative area of Dumfries and Galloway, Scotland, from 1864 to 1867 on the Kirkcudbright Railway.

== History ==
The station was opened on 7 March 1864 by the Glasgow and South Western Railway. It was also known as Castle Douglas St Andrew and Castle Douglas St Andrew Road in the timetable. It closed on 1 December 1867. It was situated on a section of St Andrew Street now part of Abercromby Road.

Preceding station	Disused railways	Following station
Terminus	Glasgow and South Western Railway; Kirkcudbright Railway	Bridge of Dee; Line and station closed
