= List of listed buildings in New Galloway, Dumfries and Galloway =

This is a list of listed buildings in the town of New Galloway in Dumfries and Galloway, Scotland.

== List ==
Name	Location	Date Listed	Grid Ref. (Note: Sometimes known as OSGB36, the grid reference (where provided) is based on the British national grid reference system used by the Ordnance Survey. • "Guide to National Grid". Ordnance Survey. • "Get-a-map". Ordnance Survey.)	Geo-coordinates	Notes	LB Number (Note: Historic Environment Scotland assign a unique alphanumeric identifier to each designated site in Scotland, for listed buildings this always begins with "LB", for example "LB12345".)	Image
High Street, Meadowbank Cottages				55°04′20″N 4°08′27″W	Category C(S)	38473	Upload Photo
The Old School, Glenkens Community Arts Centre With Boundary Walls, Gatepiers And Railings				55°04′31″N 4°08′28″W	Category C(S)	49306	Upload Photo
Clydesdale Bank				55°04′34″N 4°08′24″W	Category B	38465	Upload Photo
West Port, The Thorn				55°04′24″N 4°08′28″W	Category B	38478	Upload Photo
Greenhead Brae, Greenhead And Greenhead Cottage				55°04′22″N 4°08′33″W	Category C(S)	38467	Upload Photo
High Street, Baddaroch				55°04′23″N 4°08′28″W	Category C(S)	38470	Upload Photo
High Street, Copper Cottage				55°04′22″N 4°08′27″W	Category C(S)	38471	Upload Photo
Brae Cottage, Off Wylies Brae				55°04′26″N 4°08′26″W	Category B	38464	Upload Photo
High Street, Kenburn And Burnbank				55°04′28″N 4°08′27″W	Category B	38472	Upload Photo
Meadowbank House				55°04′20″N 4°08′24″W	Category C(S)	38476	Upload Photo
High Street, Town Hall				55°04′23″N 4°08′27″W	Category B	38475	Upload another image
High Street, Corner House				55°04′24″N 4°08′28″W	Category B	38468	Upload Photo
High Street, Mill House				55°04′28″N 4°08′28″W	Category B	38474	Upload Photo
East Port, Hillboro Cottage				55°04′24″N 4°08′26″W	Category B	38466	Upload Photo
High Street, Inton				55°04′23″N 4°08′28″W	Category C(S)	38469	Upload Photo

== Key ==
The scheme for classifying buildings in Scotland is:

- Category A: "buildings of national or international importance, either architectural or historic; or fine, little-altered examples of some particular period, style or building type."
- Category B: "buildings of regional or more than local importance; or major examples of some particular period, style or building type, which may have been altered."
- Category C: "buildings of local importance; lesser examples of any period, style, or building type, as originally constructed or moderately altered; and simple traditional buildings which group well with other listed buildings."

In March 2016 there were 47,288 listed buildings in Scotland. Of these, 8% were Category A, and 50% were Category B, with the remaining 42% being Category C.
