= Ken Bridge =

19th-century road bridge in Dumfries and Galloway, Scotland

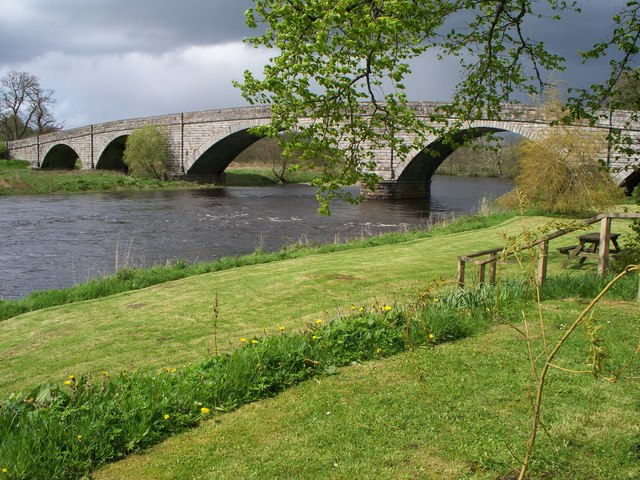
- Ken Bridge
- Coordinates: 55.0810°N 4.1312°W
- Carries: A712
- Crosses: Water of Ken
- Locale: Dumfries and Galloway

Characteristics
- Material: Granite ashlar
- Total length: 110 metres (360 ft)
- No. of spans: 5

History
- Designer: John Rennie the Elder
- Construction start: 1820
- Construction end: 1821

Listed Building – Category A
- Official name: Ken Bridge
- Designated: 4 November 1971
- Reference no.: LB3316

Location
- Interactive map of Ken Bridge

The Ken Bridge is a road bridge about 0.8 kilometres (0.5 mi) north east of New Galloway in Dumfries and Galloway, Scotland, which carries the A712 road over the Water of Ken towards Balmaclellan. Designed by John Rennie shortly before his death, it has been designated a Category A listed building.

== History ==
Built between 1821 and 1822 to a design by Rennie, it replaced an earlier bridge in the same location, also by Rennie, which was completed in 1811 but destroyed by flooding shortly afterwards. Rennie died on 4 October 1821, before the construction of the bridge was complete.

== Description ==
The bridge is entirely made of granite ashlar, roughly finished for the most part, with polished granite surfaces on the inner faces of the parapet and on the soffits. It curves along its length, and has a total span of 110 metres (360 ft), with the widest central arch spanning approximately 30 metres (100 ft). Its piers are supported on the riverbed by round-nosed cutwaters, and the spandrels between the arches are decorated with pilasters.

The bridge has been praised for its aesthetic qualities. Architectural historian John Gifford, writing in the Dumfries and Galloway volume of the Pevsner Architectural Guides series, described it as a "long elegant curve of granite ashlar", and John R. Hume, the former chief inspector of historic buildings for Historic Scotland, wrote that it was the "most elegant of Rennie's bridges in the South-West... ...five graded segmental arches leap the Ken's floodplain in a long, low streamlined curve."

The bridge now carries the A712 road towards Balmaclellan. It was designated a Category A listed building in 1971.

== See also ==
- List of bridges in Scotland

== Sources ==
- "Ken Bridge". Canmore.
- Historic Environment Scotland. "Ken Bridge (Category A Listed Building LB3316)".
- Gifford, John (1996). The Buildings of Scotland:Dumfries and Galloway. London: Penguin. ISBN 0140-71067-1.
- "Ken Bridge". Dictionary of Scottish Architects.
- "John Rennie". Dictionary of Scottish Architects.
- Hume, John R (2000). Dumfries and Galloway: An Illustrated Architectural Guide. The Rutland Press. ISBN 1 873 190 344.
