= Abbey Yard =

Archaeological site in Scotland

Coordinates: 54.9603°N 3.9767°W

Abbey Yard is a location in Dumfries and Galloway, Scotland.

Abbey Yard is near Glenlochar in the historical county of Kirkcudbrightshire in the Dumfries and Galloway area.

The fort was built in 81 AD by the Governor Gnaeus Julius Agricola and enclosed an area roughly 7 acres (28,000 m^{2}). Abbey Yard is the local name for the area containing the fort remains; this reflects the incorrect identification on Ordnance Survey maps prior to the 1940s as the site of an abbey.
