= List of listed buildings in Kells, Dumfries and Galloway =

This is a list of listed buildings in the civil parish of Kells, in Dumfries and Galloway, Scotland.

== List ==
Name	Location	Date Listed	Grid Ref. (Note: Sometimes known as OSGB36, the grid reference (where provided) is based on the British national grid reference system used by the Ordnance Survey. • "Guide to National Grid". Ordnance Survey. • "Get-a-map". Ordnance Survey.)	Geo-coordinates	Notes	LB Number (Note: Historic Environment Scotland assign a unique alphanumeric identifier to each designated site in Scotland, for listed buildings this always begins with "LB", for example "LB12345".)	Image
Galloway Hydroelectric Power Scheme, Glenlee Power Station And Bridge				55°05′59″N 4°11′11″W	Category B	9736	Upload Photo
Kenmure Castle				55°03′47″N 4°08′18″W	Category B	9745	Upload Photo
Polharrow Bridge Over Polharrow Burn				55°08′02″N 4°11′33″W	Category B	9750	Upload Photo
Forrest Lodge				55°09′07″N 4°16′15″W	Category B	9726	Upload Photo
Galloway Hydroelectric Power Scheme, Carsfad Dam				55°08′45″N 4°11′17″W	Category B	51695	Upload Photo
Barskeoch Mains				55°07′28″N 4°11′07″W	Category C(S)	9722	Upload Photo
Glenlee Park, Sarcophagus Near House				55°05′45″N 4°10′46″W	Category B	9741	Upload Photo
Glenlee Park				55°05′46″N 4°10′45″W	Category B	9737	Upload Photo
Kells Parish Church (Church Of Scotland)				55°04′51″N 4°08′40″W	Category B	9743	Upload Photo
Overton House, Garden Building				55°04′45″N 4°08′28″W	Category B	9749	Upload Photo
Stroan Viaduct				55°00′22″N 4°07′04″W	Category B	9751	Upload Photo
Airds Of Kells				55°00′40″N 4°04′18″W	Category B	9721	Upload Photo
Galloway Hydroelectric Power Scheme, Earlstoun Dam				55°07′01″N 4°10′26″W	Category B	51697	Upload Photo
Glenlee Park Steading Near House				55°05′45″N 4°10′48″W	Category B	9739	Upload Photo
Kells Parish Churchyard				55°04′50″N 4°08′38″W	Category B	9744	Upload Photo
Galloway Hydroelectric Power Scheme, Earlstoun Power Station				55°06′43″N 4°10′27″W	Category B	9725	Upload Photo
Galloway Hydroelectric Power Scheme, Carsfad Power Station				55°08′37″N 4°11′21″W	Category B	51696	Upload Photo
Glenlee Park, Urn And Pedestal In Grounds Of Glenlee House				55°05′44″N 4°10′44″W	Category B	9740	Upload Photo
Knocknalling Barn				55°08′17″N 4°12′12″W	Category A	9746	Upload Photo
Knocknalling Stableyard				55°08′17″N 4°12′09″W	Category B	9718	Upload Photo
Coom Bridge				55°05′54″N 4°10′41″W	Category C(S)	9724	Upload Photo
Glenlee Park Bridge To East Of House				55°05′46″N 4°10′49″W	Category B	9738	Upload Photo
Old Garroch				55°06′55″N 4°12′52″W	Category B	9748	Upload Photo
Hensol Bridge				55°00′26″N 4°05′28″W	Category B	9742	Upload Photo
Knockreoch Bridge				55°08′46″N 4°14′20″W	Category C(S)	9747	Upload Photo
Knocknalling House And Walled Garden				55°08′16″N 4°12′09″W	Category B	9717	Upload Photo
Clatteringshaws Bridge				55°02′59″N 4°16′39″W	Category B	9723	Upload Photo

== Key ==
The scheme for classifying buildings in Scotland is:

- Category A: "buildings of national or international importance, either architectural or historic; or fine, little-altered examples of some particular period, style or building type."
- Category B: "buildings of regional or more than local importance; or major examples of some particular period, style or building type, which may have been altered."
- Category C: "buildings of local importance; lesser examples of any period, style, or building type, as originally constructed or moderately altered; and simple traditional buildings which group well with other listed buildings."

In March 2016 there were 47,288 listed buildings in Scotland. Of these, 8% were Category A, and 50% were Category B, with the remaining 42% being Category C.
