= Little Ross =

Little Ross Lighthouse Range Rear
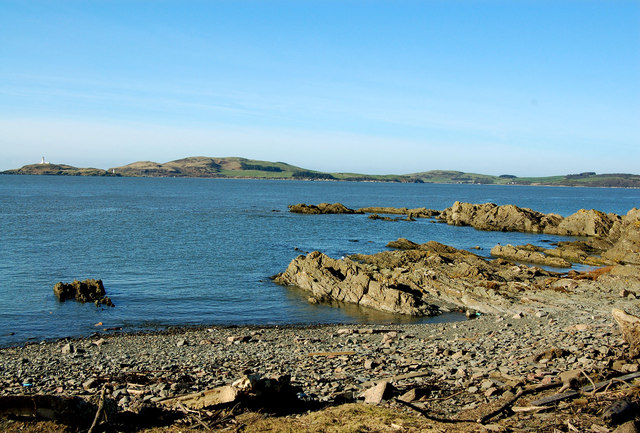
- Gypsy point looking over to Little Ross Island, showing its two lighthouses
- Location: Little Ross Island; Kirkcudbright; Dumfries and Galloway; Scotland; United Kingdom
- OS grid: NX6595543196
- Coordinates: 54.765671°N 4.084695°W

Tower
- Constructed: 1843
- Designed by: Alan Stevenson
- Construction: masonry tower
- Automated: 1961
- Height: 22 m (72 ft)
- Shape: cylindrical tower with balcony and lantern attached to 1-storey keeper’s house
- Markings: white tower, black lantern, ochre trim
- Power source: solar power
- Operator: Northern Lighthouse Board
- Heritage: category B listed building

Light
- Focal height: 50 m (160 ft)
- Range: 12 nmi (22 km; 14 mi)
- Characteristic: Fl W 5 s

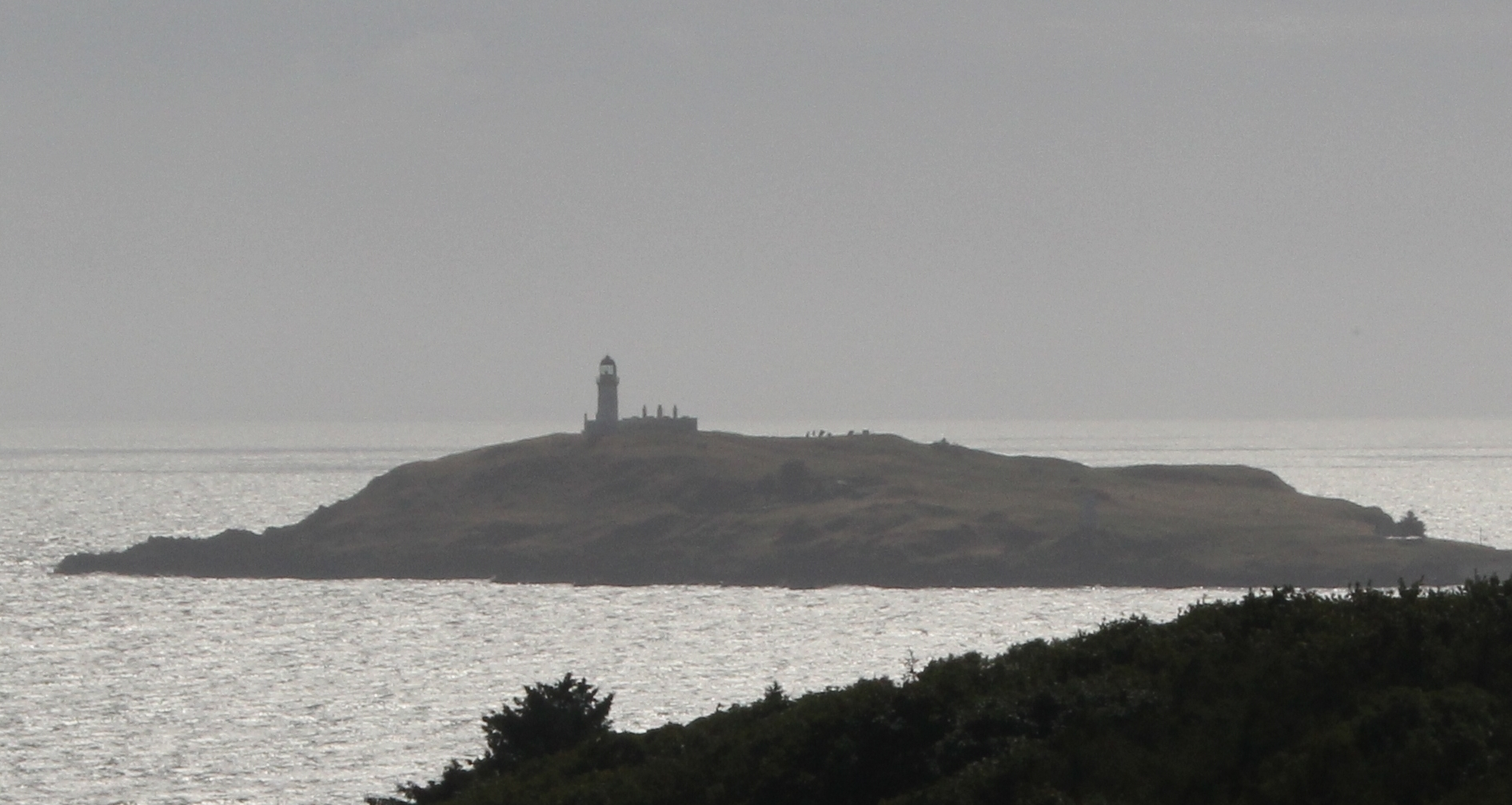

Little Ross is a 29-acre (12-hectare) island with a lighthouse on the Solway Coast south of the town of Kirkcudbright in Galloway, Scotland. It is next to Meikle Ross on the mainland, which is a headland, and there are two small rocks off it, Sugarloaf and Fox Craig. The island can only be accessed by private boat or helicopter. Its sole electricity is supplied by solar panels and a small wind turbine. The island is well known for the murder of one of its lighthouse keepers, Hugh Clark.

== History ==
The lighthouse was constructed in 1843 by Alan Stevenson. It was built at the mouth of Kirkcudbright Bay to close the gap between other lighthouses at the Mull of Galloway and Southerness. It is approximately 66 feet tall. In the 1900s, the island was home to the head lighthouse keeper, underkeeper and their families, which totaled 16 people, whose food was provided by a small dairy and piggery on the island.

In August 1960 two relief lighthouse keepers were on duty during the holiday of the principal keeper. The secretary of the local RNLI arrived on the island with his son for lunch and a walk and discovered the body of one of the keepers, Hugh Clark. After a nationwide hunt the other relief keeper, Robert Dickson was arrested and found guilty of murder for which he was initially sentenced to hang, a sentence subsequently changed to life imprisonment.

The lighthouse was manned until the murder, and has been automated since 1961. The island can only be accessed by private boat or helicopter. It is not connected to any electrical grid, so its sole electricity is supplied by solar panels and a small wind turbine. It is owned and managed by the Commissioners for Northern Lighthouses, who make regular maintenance visits to the property throughout the year.

In July 2017 the island was put on sale for £325,000 GBP with Estate Agents Galbraith, which is comparable in price to a same price as a two-bedroom apartment in Edinburgh, and less than a two-bedroom apartment in London. The property listing included a six-bedroom, B-listed cottage, but does not include the lighthouse. The listing does include three B-listed, "ruinous" barns and a courtyard. David Corrie, senior associate at the property agency Galbraith, Castle Douglas, noted that "Private islands rarely come up for sale at an affordable price and particularly one with a habitable house and additional properties."

== See also ==
- List of lighthouses in Scotland
- List of Northern Lighthouse Board lighthouses
- List of outlying islands of Scotland

== Publications ==
- Life and Death on Little Ross, The Story of an island, a lighthouse and its keepers by David R. Collin. Whittles Publishing ISBN 978-184995-359-7
