= Bridge of Dee, Galloway =

Coordinates: 54.918674°N 3.978377°W

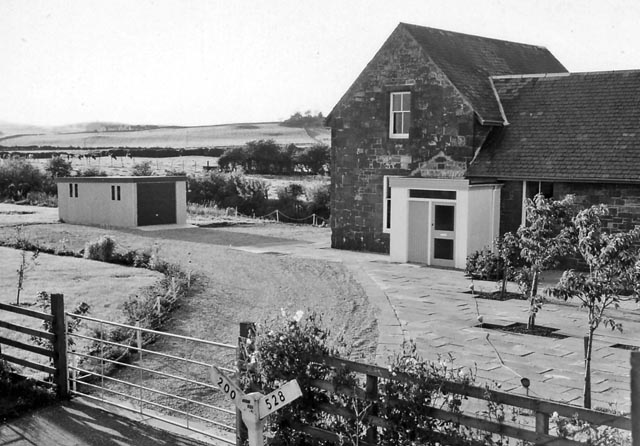
Bridge of Dee Station

Bridge of Dee, Galloway is a settlement on the River Dee, Galloway. It lies on the A75 just west of Castle Douglas, and north-east of Kirkcudbright.

The former Kirkcudbright Railway, linking Kirkcudbright with Castle Douglas, passed through the village. The station is now a house.

== People from Bridge of Dee ==
- William Allan Forsyth Hepburn FRSE OBE MC LLD (1891-1950) educationalist

== Old Bridge of Dee ==
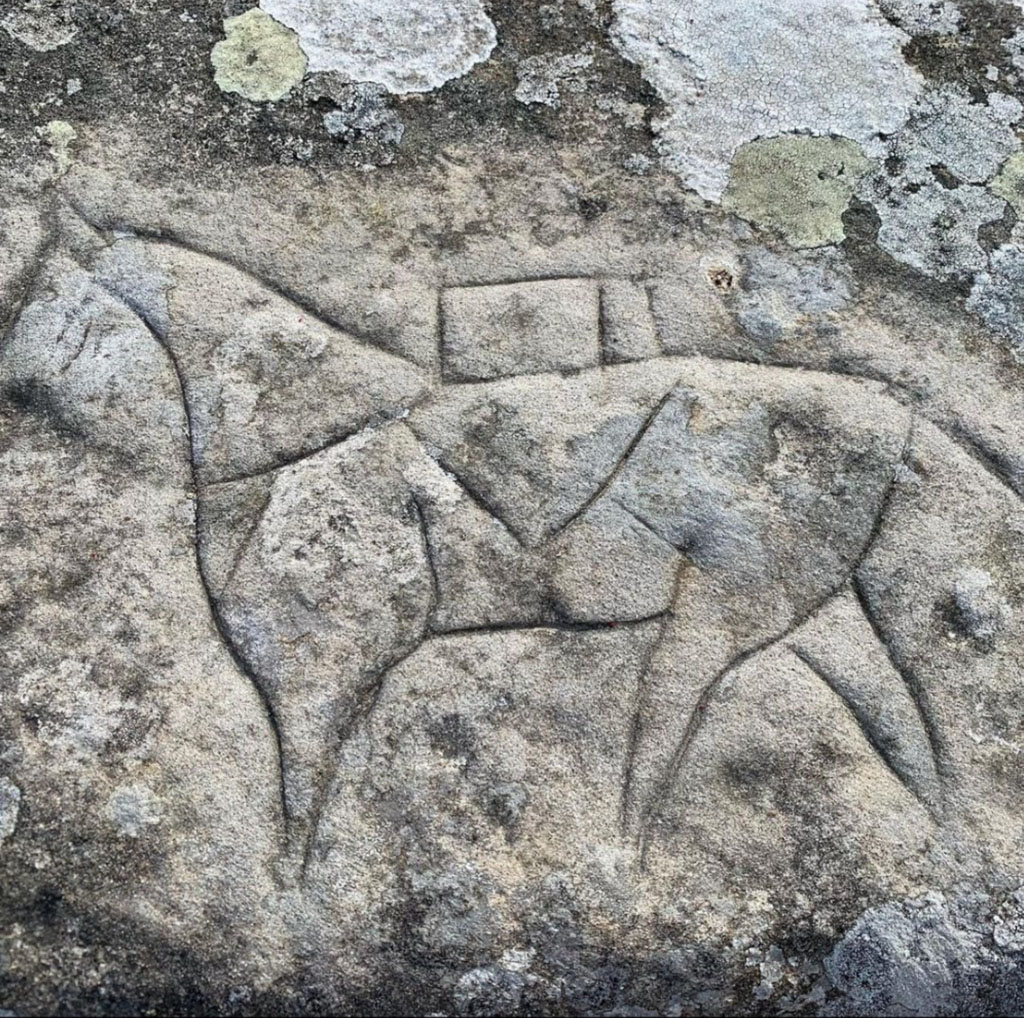
Horse carving on a coping stone

The old bridge was possibly a packhorse bridge, hence the carving.
