= Robert Paterson (stonemason) =

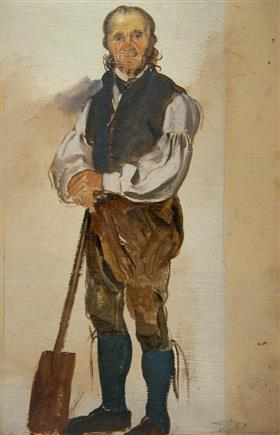
- Old Mortality by George Harvey
- Church: Reformed Presbytery

Personal details
- Born: 1716
- Died: 1801 (aged 84–85)

Robert Paterson (1716–1801), known as "Old Mortality", was a stonemason who took it upon himself to travel around lowland Scotland carving inscriptions for the unmarked graves of Covenanters martyred in the 17th century. Walter Scott made him a principal character in his novel Old Mortality (1816).

== Life ==
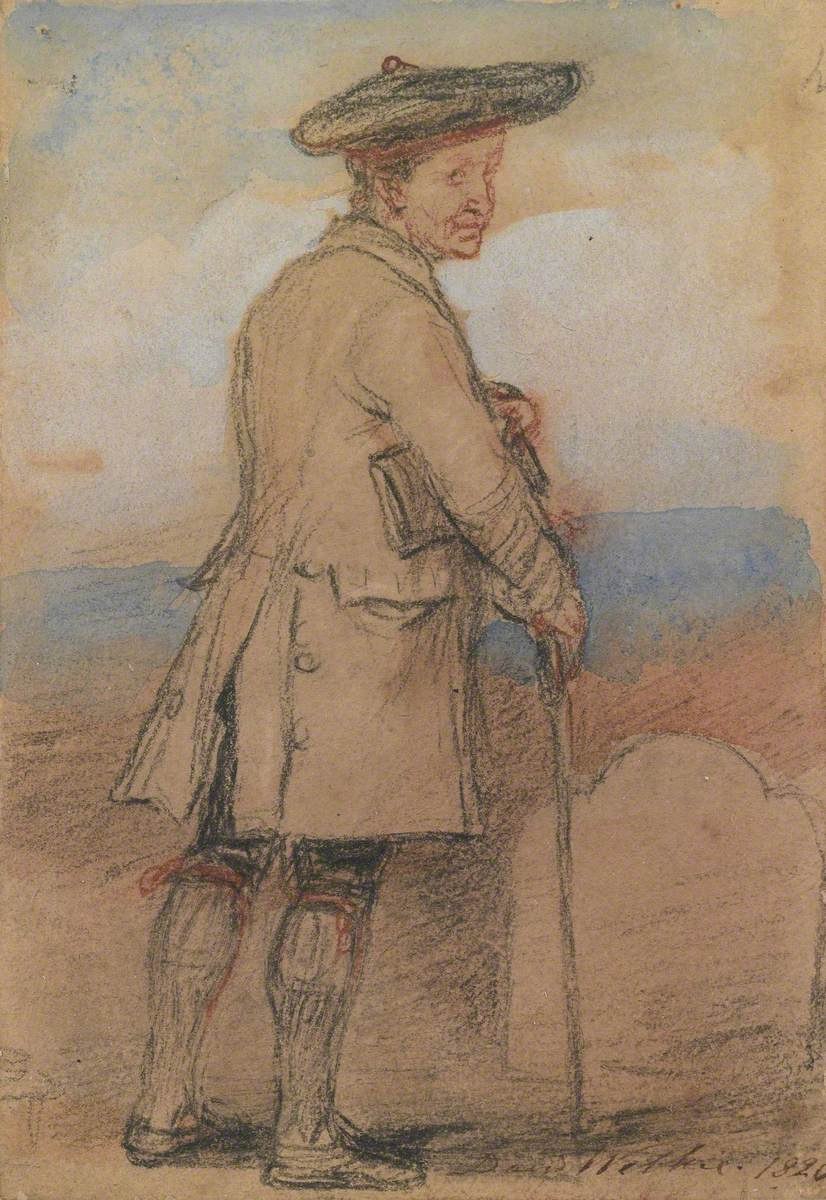
Study for 'Old Mortality' by David Wilkie

Paterson was born near Hawick in 1715. Through the patronage of Sir Thomas Kirkpatrick, whose cook he had married, he obtained the lease of a quarry at Gatelawbridge, but in 1745 his house was plundered by the retreating Jacobites, and Paterson himself, a pronounced Cameronian, was carried off a prisoner.

He subsequently devoted his life to cutting and erecting stones for the graves of the Covenanters, for 40 years wandering from place to place in the lowlands. He died in poverty at Caerlaverock in 1801, and a stone to his memory was erected by Scott's publishers in 1869 in the churchyard. There is also a memorial in Balmaclellan churchyard where Paterson lived for many years.

== Family ==
Robert's son Walter Paterson was also a stonemason, and was father to Nathaniel Paterson who became Moderator of the General Assembly of the Free Church of Scotland in 1850.

Paterson's tombstone reads "To the Memory of Robert Paterson, Stone-engraver, well known as "Old Mortality," who died at Bankend of Caerlaverock, 14th February, 1800, aged 88; also of Elizabeth Gray, his spouse, who died at Balmaclellan village, 5th May, 1785, aged 59; also of Robert, their son, who died 30th April, 1846, aged 90; also of Agnes M'Knight, his spouse, who died 5th August, 1818; also of John, their son, who died 29th January, 18 10, aged 13; also of Alexander, who died at Wakefield, 26th October, 1837, aged 42; also of Robert, their son who died at Liverpool, 3rd February, 1865, aged 65— Erected by Thomas Paterson, 1855."

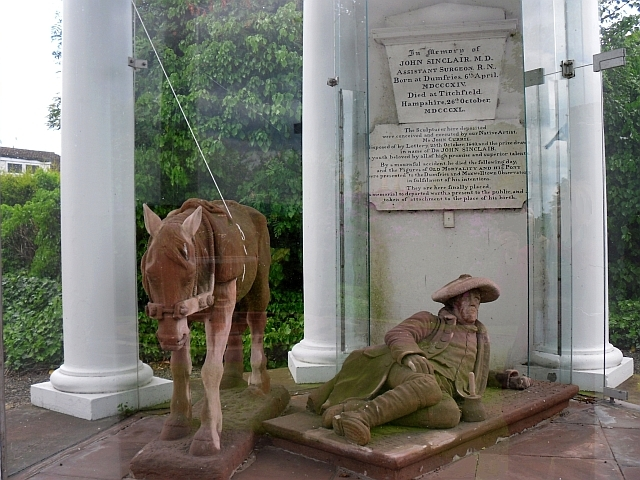
Statue of "Old Mortality" and his pony, in the grounds of the Dumfries Museum. The sculptures are by John Corrie.

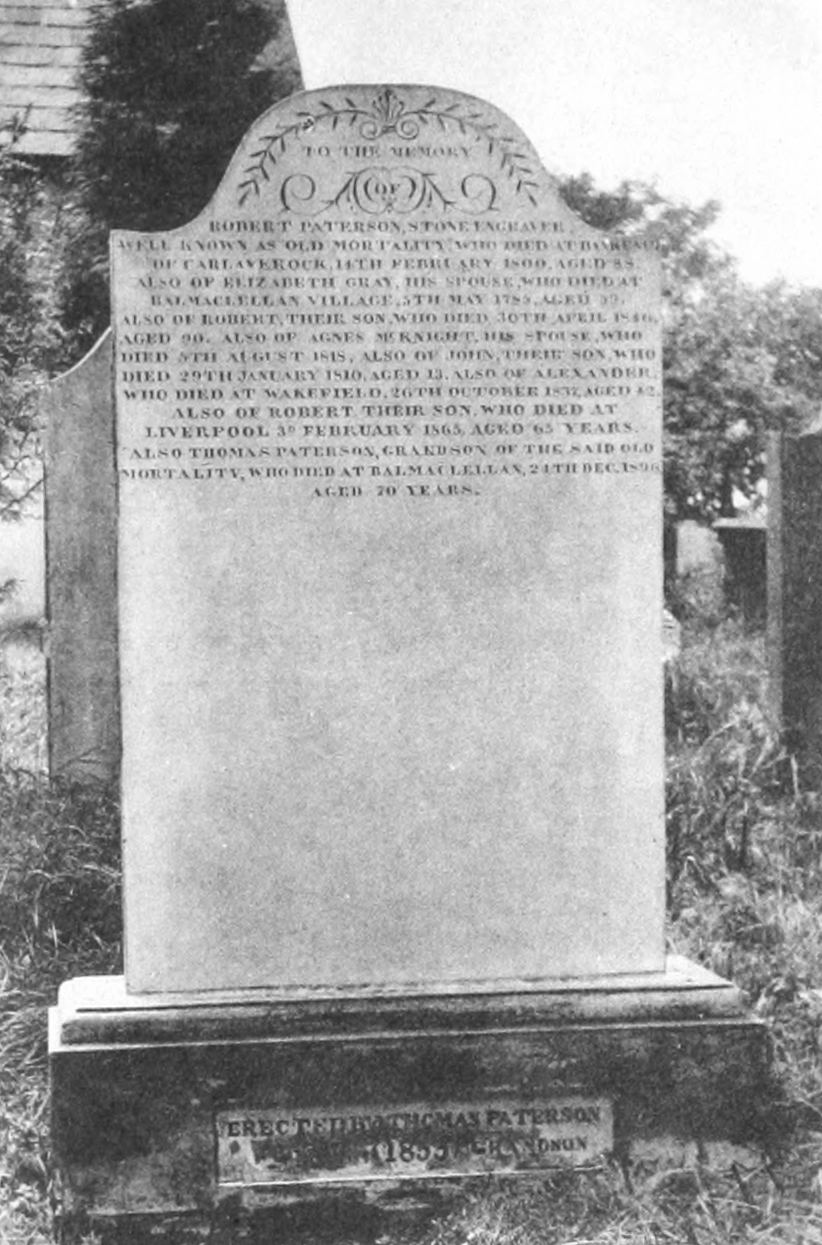
Robert Paterson's tombstone

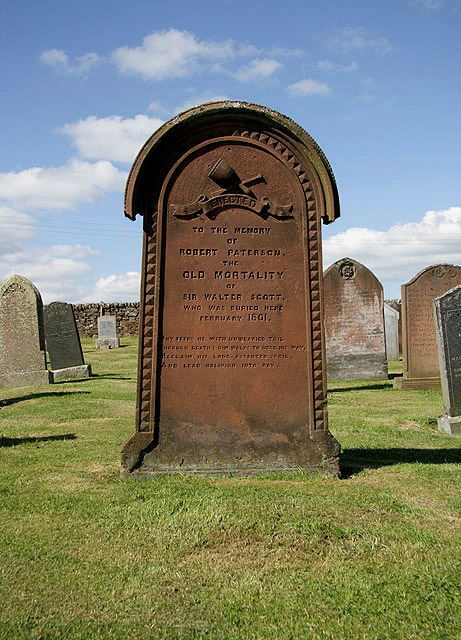
Gravestone of Robert Paterson ('Old Mortality'), Caerlaverock, Dumfriesshire
