= Bridge of Dee railway station =

Disused railway station in Bridge of Dee, Dumfries and Galloway

Coordinates: 54.92139°N 3.97945°W

Bridge of Dee
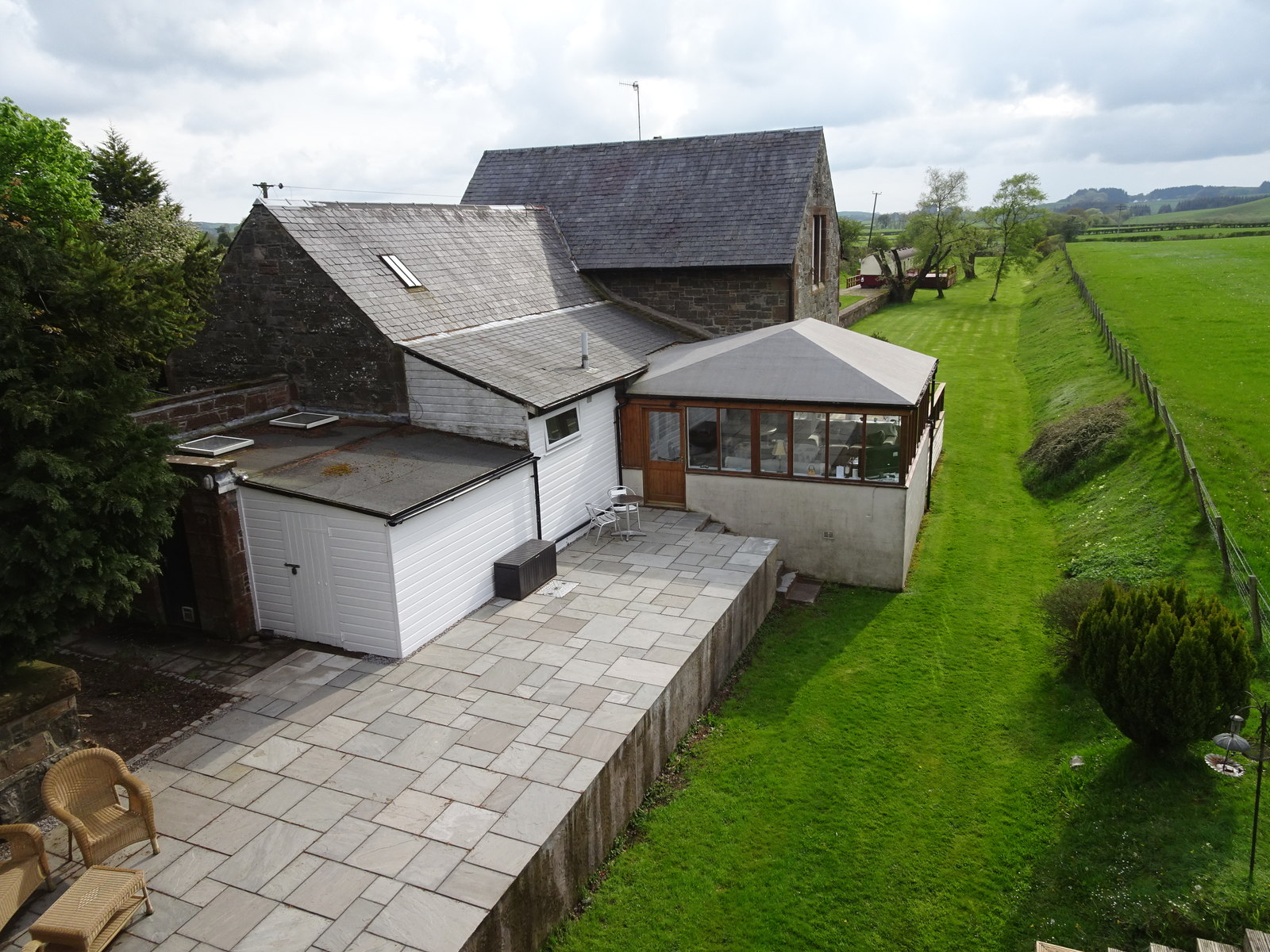
- The site of the station, looking southwest to Tarff, in 2019

General information
- Location: Bridge of Dee, Dumfries and Galloway; Scotland
- Platforms: 1

Other information
- Status: Disused

History
- Original company: Glasgow and South Western Railway
- Pre-grouping: Glasgow and South Western Railway
- Post-grouping: London, Midland and Scottish Railway; British Railways (Scottish Region)

Key dates
- 18 April 1864: Opened
- 26 September 1949: Closed
Location

Bridge of Dee railway station served the settlement of Bridge of Dee, Dumfries and Galloway, Scotland from 1864 to 1949 on the Kirkcudbright Railway.

== History ==
The station opened on 18 April 1864 by the Glasgow and South Western Railway. To the south was the goods yard and to the north was the signal box, which opened in 1882. It closed in 1925 and was replaced by a ground frame. The station closed to both passengers and goods traffic on 26 September 1949.

Preceding station	Disused railways	Following station
Castle Douglas; Line and station closed	Kirkcudbright Railway	Tarff; Line and station closed
