= Kirkcudbright Bay =

Inlet of the Irish Sea in southwest Scotland

Coordinates: 54.77°N 4.07°W

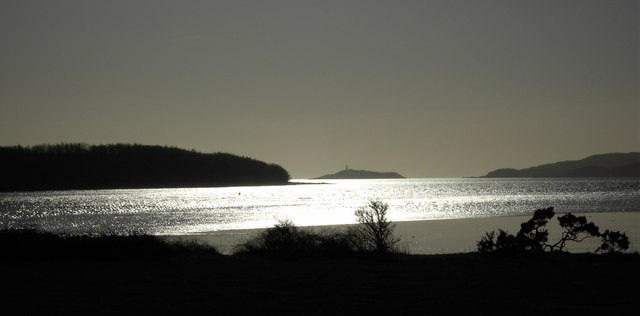
Kirkcudbright Bay, looking towards Little Ross

Kirkcudbright Bay is an inlet of the Irish Sea on the coast of Galloway in southwest Scotland. Its coastline falls entirely within the modern administrative area of Dumfries and Galloway and the historical county of Kirkcudbrightshire. It extends in a north-south direction for about 6 miles (10 km), and is up to 2 miles (3 km) wide.

The estuary of the River Dee enters the bay at its head, where there are extensive tidal flats. The peninsula of St Mary's Isle divides the bay into two, with the river Dee on the west side and Manxman’s Lake on the east. At the mouth of the bay, close to the western shore, is the island of Little Ross, off which a hazardous sandbar has resulted in many shipwrecks. Much of the eastern shore is occupied by the Dundrennan Range, a weapons testing range.
