= Loch Ken =

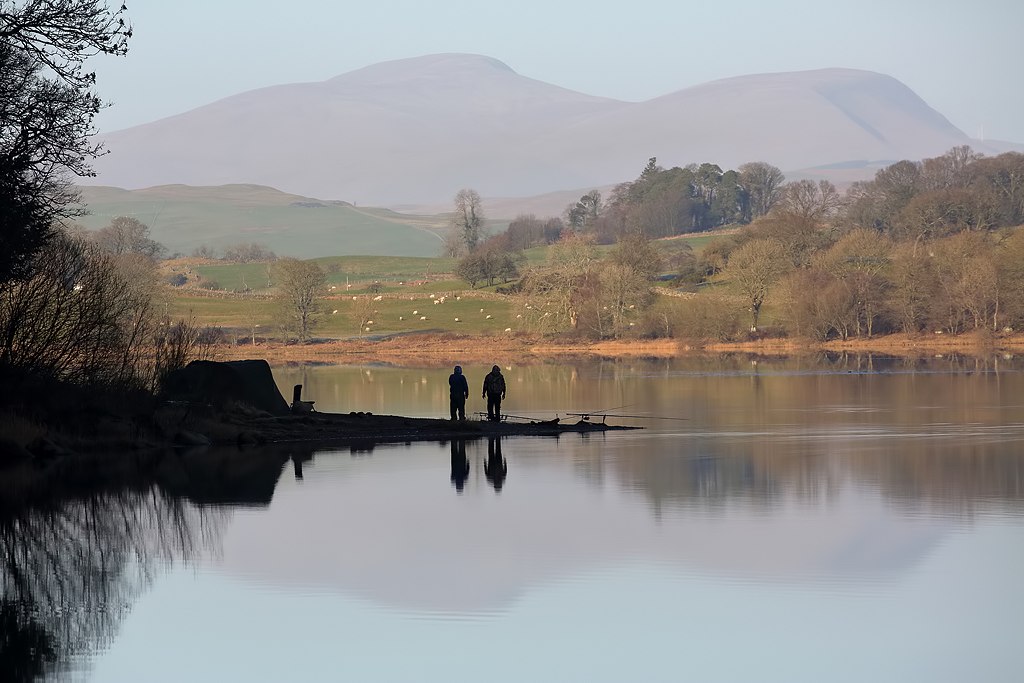
- Loch Ken, looking towards Cairnsmore of Carsphairn

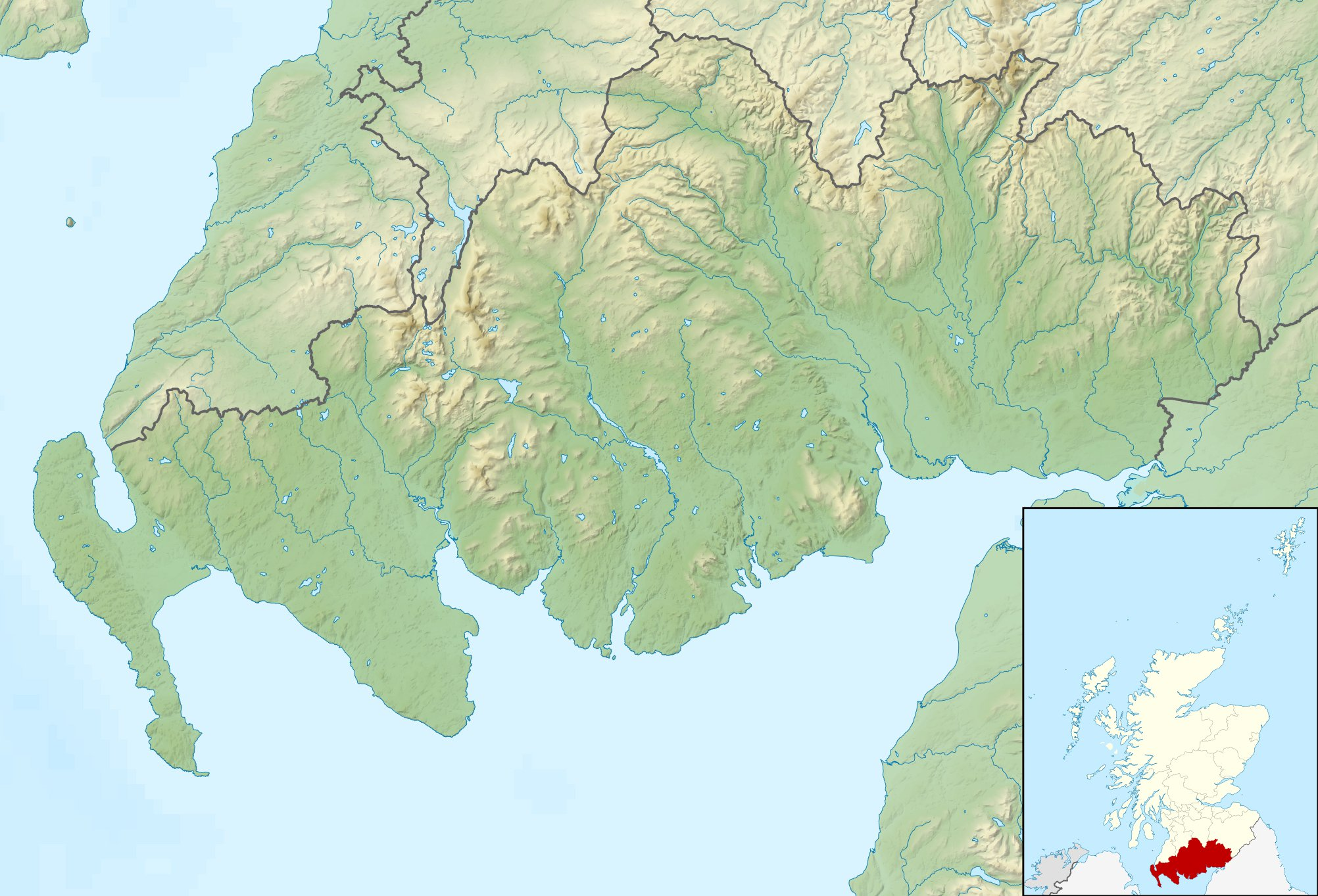
- Location within Dumfries and Galloway
- Location: Dumfries and Galloway
- Coordinates: 55.009°N 4.056°W
- Type: freshwater loch,
- Primary inflows: Water of Ken, River Dee
- Basin countries: Scotland
- Max. length: 9 mi (14 km)
- Settlements: Glenlochar, Laurieston, Mossdale, Crossmichael, Parton

Ramsar Wetland
- Official name: Loch Ken & River Dee Marshes
- Designated: 31 August 1992
- Reference no.: 568

Loch Ken is a 9 miles (14 km) long freshwater loch in the historic county of Kirkcudbrightshire in Dumfries and Galloway, Scotland. It lies in the Glenkens, where it is fed from the north by the Water of Ken and from the west by the Dee. It continues as the Dee south from Glenlochar, where the water is held back by the Glenlochar Barrage. Part of the Galloway hydro-electric power scheme, the barrage regulates the river's flow.

== Geography ==
Villages around Loch Ken include Glenlochar at the south, Laurieston and Mossdale on the west side of the loch, and Crossmichael and Parton on the east. The village of New Galloway lies one mile to its north. The parish church of Balmaghie is also by the loch.

Loch Ken is used recreationally for water skiing, fishing, and sailing, with Glenlaggan Lodges and Loch Ken Marina catering to visitors.

A railway viaduct, once part of the Portpatrick Railway crosses the loch at Boat o' Rhone, but is now disused and in an unsafe condition.

Loch Ken and River Dee Marshes was designated a Ramsar site on 21 August 1992.

At the northern end of the loch stands Kenmure Castle. John Murray was gamekeeper to the Gordons at Kenmure Castle and is remembered for having caught in the loch the largest pike on record, the head of which rested on his shoulder, with the tail trailing on the ground. Its weight was seventy-two pounds, and it measured about seven feet in length.

The skeleton of the head was for many years preserved on display in the Billiard Room at Kenmure where it was studied and measured by Charles Tate Regan ichthyologist, of the Natural History Museum. Murray died in 1777 and is buried at Kells Churchyard; on his tombstone are carved in relief a gun, powder pouch, fishing-rod, dog and pigeon.

== Loch Ken Trust ==
In June 2020, Loch Ken Trust was formed as a Scottish Charitable Incorporated Organisation (SCIO), with the purpose, "To promote the natural, cultural and recreational assets of the Loch Ken area for the benefit of the public and to support sustainable local communities.
