= Ringford =

Coordinates: 54.89768°N 4.04586°W

Ringford is a village in the historical county of Kirkcudbrightshire in Dumfries and Galloway located at grid reference NX689578 beside the Tarff Water. It is about 7 kilometres (4.3 mi) north of the fishing town of Kirkcudbright. It has a war memorial and a village hall. The Kirkcudbright Railway used to run past the village, the nearest stop being Tarff.
