= New Galloway Town Hall =

Historic municipal building in Scotland

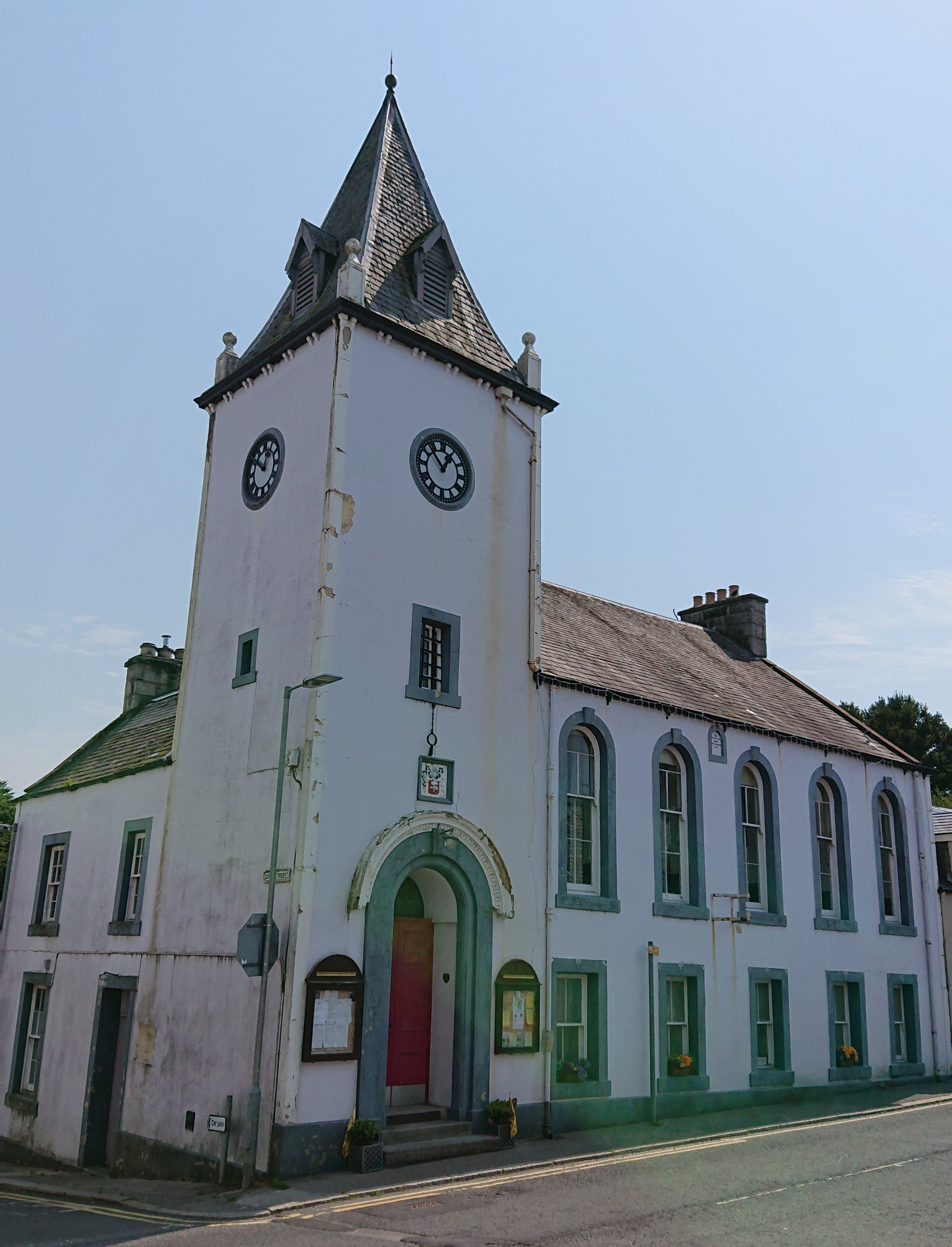
- New Galloway Town Hall

- Location within Dumfries and Galloway
- 55°4′23.5″N 4°08′26.5″W
- Type: Town Hall, former tolbooth
- Location: New Galloway, Dumfries and Galloway

History
- Built: Before 1711
- Built for: New Galloway Town Council

Site notes
- Restored: 1875

Listed Building – Category B
- Designated: 1971
- Reference no.: LB38475

The New Galloway Town Hall is a municipal building in Dumfries and Galloway, Scotland, situated on the town's high street. A tolbooth has existed on the site of the current building since at least 1711; in 1875, it was rebuilt and enlarged. In 1971 it was designated a Category B listed building.

== Description ==
New Galloway Town Hall stands on the east side of the High Street, at a crossroads with East Port. It is a two-storey, five-bay building, with a square tower at its north end. The tower has clock faces near the top, and a steep pyramid spire, with louvered lucarnes, and ball finials on each corner and the peak.

The main entrance to the building is in the west face of the tower, through a round-arched doorway. Above the door is an armorial panel, which may be eighteenth-century in date, and above that is a window with a yett, from which is suspended a set of jougs.

On the west wall, between two of the windows near the roofline, is a panel that reads "Rebuilt and enlarged 1875".

== History ==
There has been a tolbooth on the site of the current building since at least 1711, when two bells were cast for the tower by Robert Maxwell of Edinburgh. An engraving of around 1798 shows the structure of the time, with a square tower much like the current one, but with a narrow spire rising above a crenellated parapet.

In 1837, the tolbooth had two cells, one for criminals, and a larger one for debtors, both on the first floor. The clock mechanism in the tower, which is still in use as of 2022, was made by Gillett and Bland of Croydon in 1872, replacing an older mechanism which has been described as "utterly worthless as a time keeper". The bells currently hanging in the tower are not the originals: one was recast in 1812, the other in 1872, but both re-castings reproduced the ornaments and inscriptions on the original 1711 bells.

The building was remodelled in 1875 by the architect Francis Armstrong of Dalbeattie, and it was cement rendered in 1878, making it difficult to interpret its earlier history, but it is likely that some of its existing structure dates from the eighteenth century, perhaps as early as 1711. The current entrance in the tower's west face was installed in 1895.

The building was designated a Category B listed building in 1971. It continued to serve as the meeting place of the burgh council for much of the 20th century but ceased to be the local seat of government when the enlarged Stewartry District Council was formed in 1975.

In 2021, Local Initiatives in New Galloway ("LING") offered to buy the building from Dumfries and Galloway Council for a nominal sum. In 2022, they submitted proposals to refurbish the building.

== Artworks ==
Works of art in the town hall include an 1883 painting by James Faed the younger entitled "The Town Park".

== See also ==
- List of listed buildings in New Galloway, Dumfries and Galloway

== Sources ==
- Gifford, John (1996). The Buildings of Scotland:Dumfries and Galloway. London: Penguin. ISBN 0140-71067-1.
- Historic Environment Scotland. "High Street, Town Hall (Category B Listed Building LB38475)".
- Hume, John R (2000). Dumfries and Galloway: An Illustrated Architectural Guide. Edinburgh: The Rutland Press. ISBN 1-873190-34-4.
- "Local Government (Scotland) Act 1973". Legislation.gov.uk.
- McLean, Marc (24 November 2021). "New Galloway Town Hall set to be sold for a bargain £1". The Daily Record. Scottish Daily Record and Sunday Mail Ltd.
- "New Galloway Burgh". A Vision of Britain through Time. University of Portsmouth.
- Norris, Stephen (19 April 2021). "New Galloway Town Hall ownership saga takes new twist". The Daily Record. Scottish Daily Record and Sunday Mail Ltd.
- Royal Commission on the Ancient and Historical Monuments of Scotland (1996). Tolbooths and Townhouses: Civic Architecture In Scotland To 1833. Edinburgh: H.M. Stationery Office. ISBN 9780114957995.
- "The Town Park, 1883". Art UK. Public Catalogue Foundation.
- Yule, Brian (11 May 2022). "Galloway Glens Scheme awards funding to the New Galloway Town Hall refurbishment". The Galloway Gazette. National World Publishing Ltd.
