= Barscobe Castle =

Seventeenth-century tower house in Balmaclellan, Kirkcudbrightshire, Scotland

Coordinates: 55°6′4.28″N 4°6′9″W

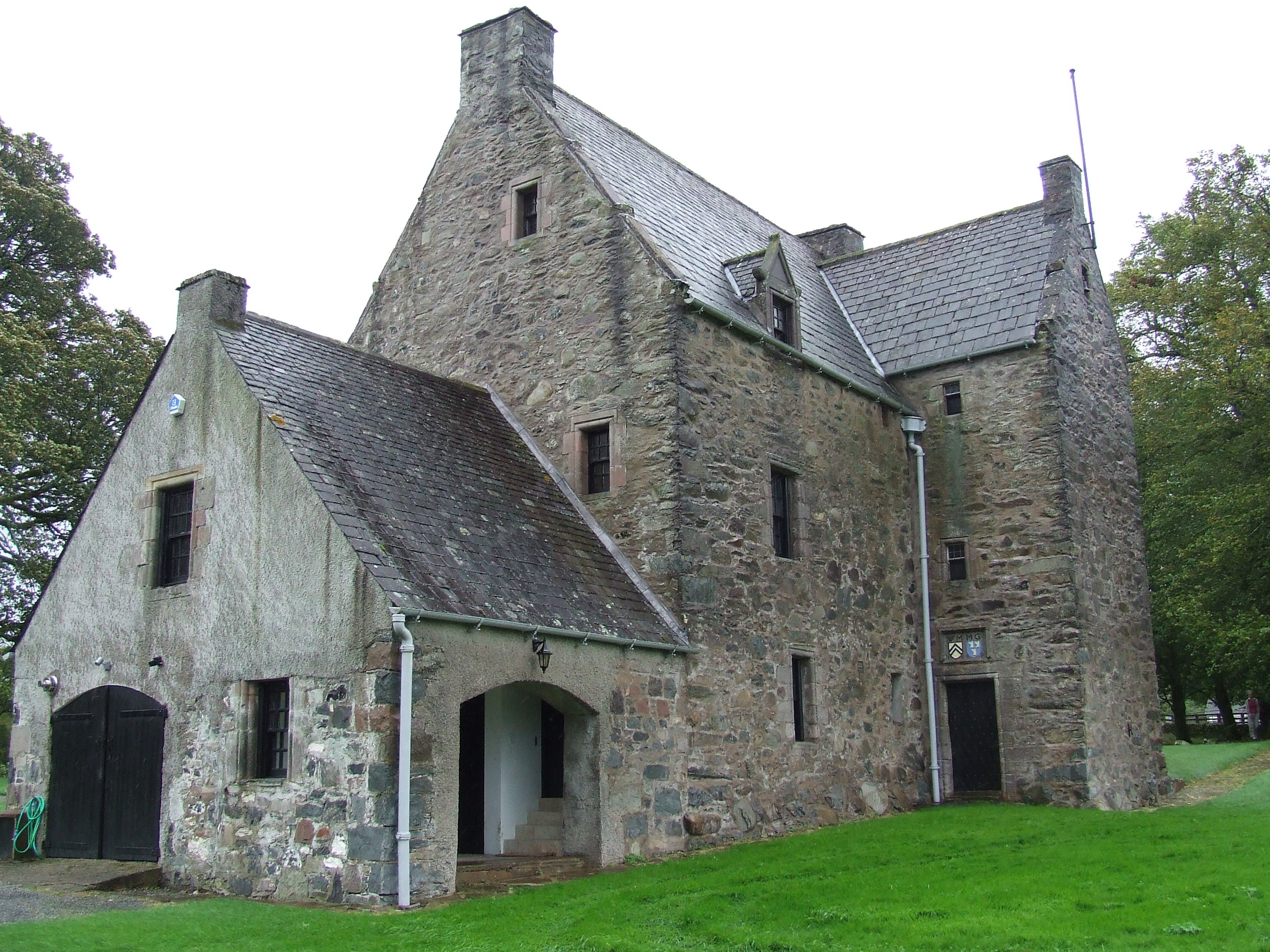
Barscobe Castle in 2011

Barscobe Castle is a 17th-century tower house in Balmaclellan, Kirkcudbrightshire, Scotland. It is a typical house of a country laird, and according to a panel above the entrance, was built in 1648. The L-plan tower was constructed using stone taken from Threave Castle. Barscobe Castle is a category A listed building.

== History ==
Above the entrance to Barscobe Castle is an armorial panel bearing the arms of Maclellan and Gordon with the initials of William Maclellan, who built the castle, and his wife Mary Gordon, the natural daughter of Sir Robert Gordon of Lochinvar, 4th Viscount Kenmure and Commissioner of War for the Stewartry from 1645 to 1648.

When William Maclellan died in 1654, his eldest son Robert Maclellan, an ardent Covenanter, succeeded to the castle and lands of Barscobe.

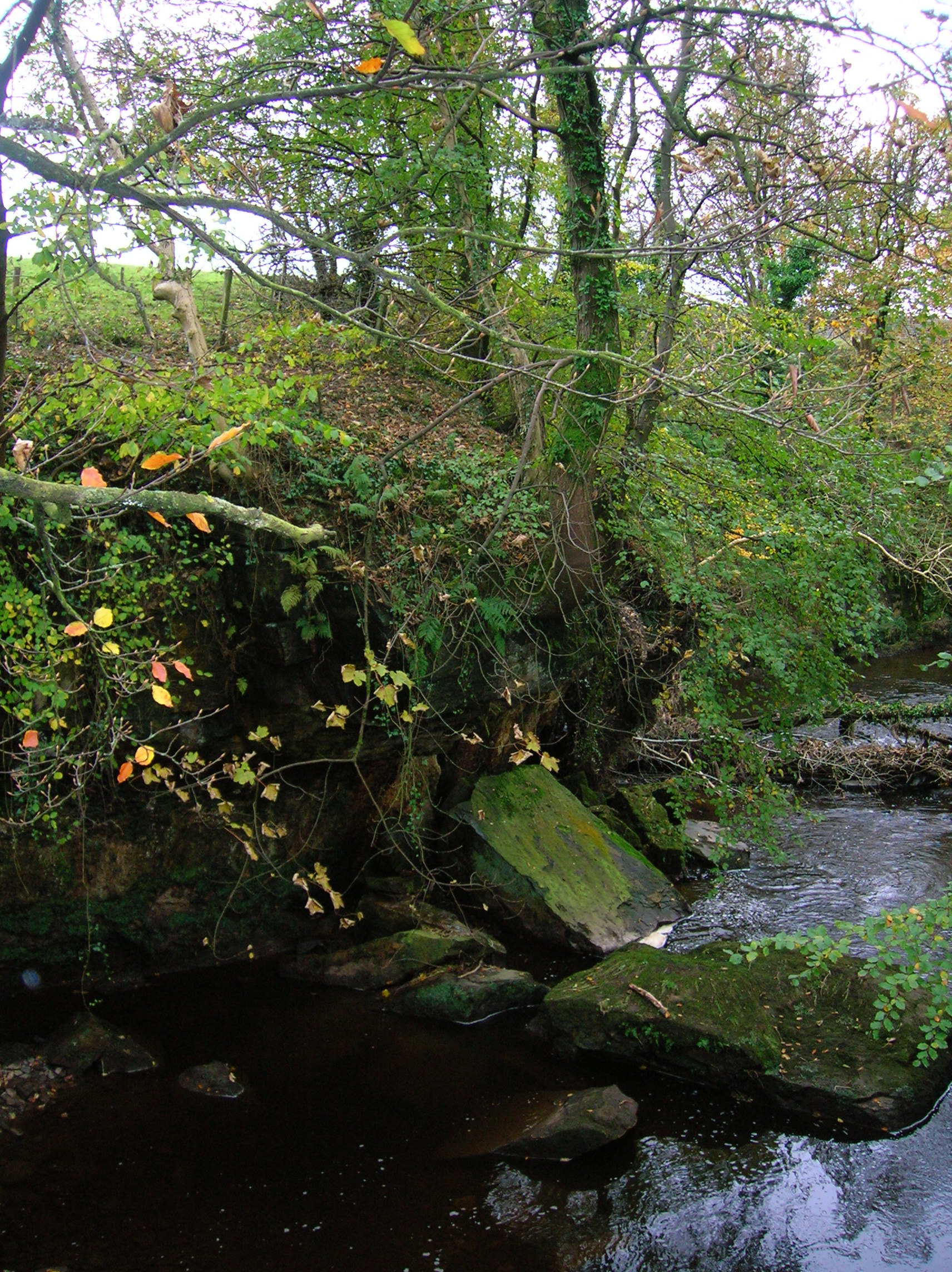
The Covenanter, Minister Peden, is said to have preached from this natural pulpit in the Linn Glen, Balmaclellan.

During the long War of the Covenants that followed the National Covenant of 1638, Barscobe became the meeting place for the late 17th century Covenanters, secretly gathering at the Holy Linn waterfall in Barscobe Wood to carry out illegal Conventicles and baptisms in their struggle for religious freedoms.

Robert Maclellan was involved in a skirmish in 1666, at the Clachan Inn, in nearby St. John's Town of Dalry, when he wounded Corporal George Deanes of the Royal Dragoon Guards by shooting fragments of his clay pipe into his leg. Later, in November of the same year, he led a force of 200 men to Dumfries where he captured Sir James Turner, district commander of the Royal Dragoon Guards, who had been sent to Galloway to deal with Covenanter disturbances, a period known as The Killing Time. Maclellan then marched towards Edinburgh. There, much of his force were slaughtered at the Battle of Rullion Green in the Pentland Hills, their actions becoming known as the Pentland Rising.

He continued to fight the Covenanters' cause until he was finally captured by Claverhouse, in 1682, and was sentenced to be hanged, drawn and quartered. However, he had his sentence deferred after he took 'the Test' and swore allegiance to the Crown in order that he may return to Barscobe. But, just a year after his return, he was murdered at Barscobe by Robert Grierson of Mylnemark, a fellow Covenanter who felt Maclellan had betrayed the cause.

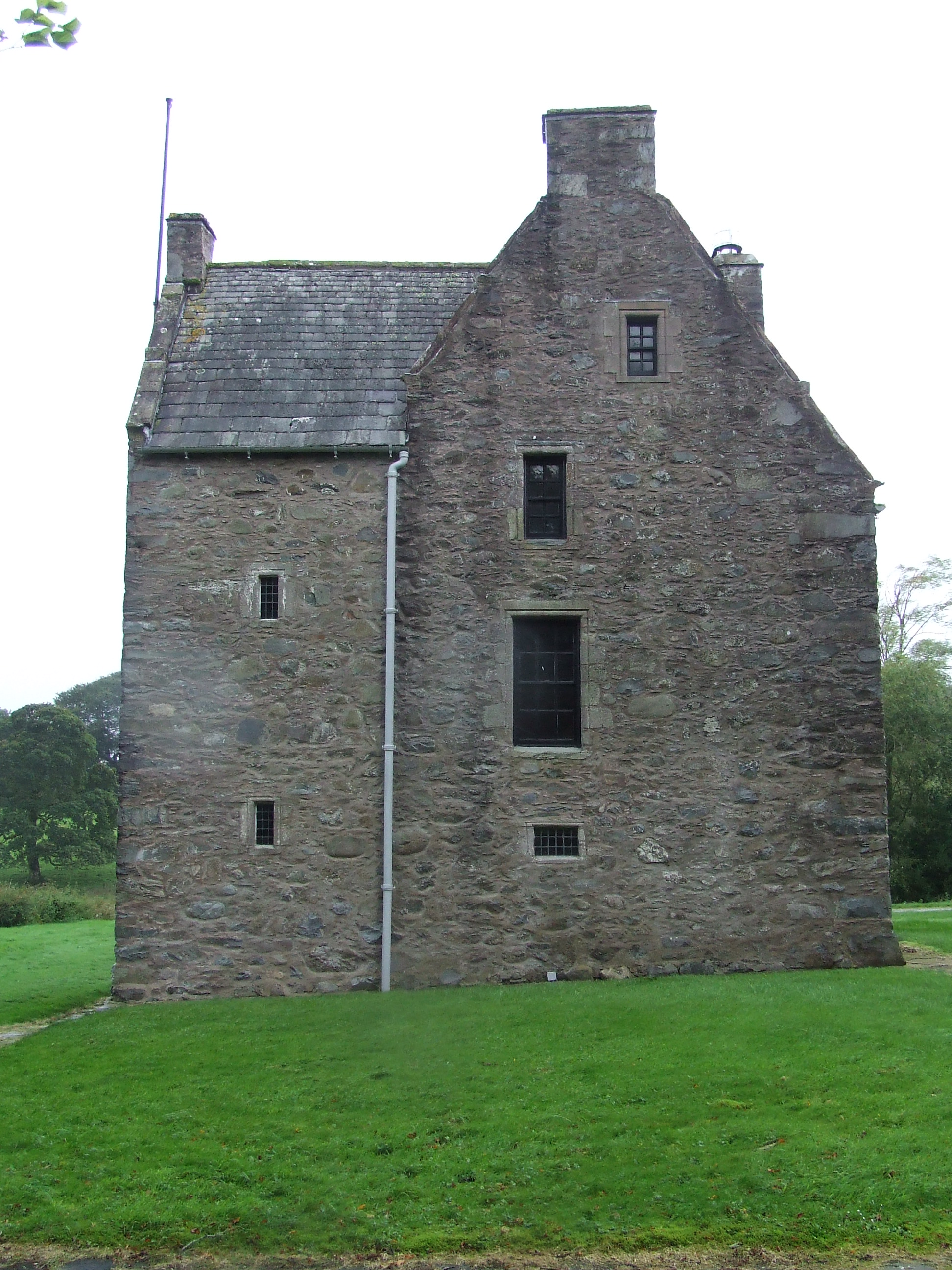

Barscobe remained in the Maclellan family until 1775, when it was sold to the Carson family. Later, in the 1920s, the estate was sold to Hugh Laing, a shipbuilder who built Barscobe House. It was sold again in 1961, to hotelier and politician Sir Hugh Wontner who restored Barscobe Castle in the 1970s under the guidance of its first tenant, Dame Bridget D'Oyly Carte. The architect for the restoration was Ian G Lindsay. After Sir Hugh's death in 1992, his daughter Jenifer Emery inherited the estate. She subsequently passed on the estate to her son Alistair Emery in 2007. Barscobe Castle has been inhabited since November 2011 by Stewart Gibson and Lorraine Belshaw. As of 2015, the castle is running as small seasonal bed and breakfast.

== Structure ==
The main block is three storeys high with the stair wing one storey higher. The gables have a modification of crowsteps found only in Galloway. It is a fine example of a mid-17th-century house which was unoccupied for many years until 1971 when it was restored. It has a modern byre (barn) attached, which has been converted into a garage.
