= Kirkcudbright railway station =

Disused railway station in Kirkcudbright, Dumfries and Galloway

Kirkcudbright
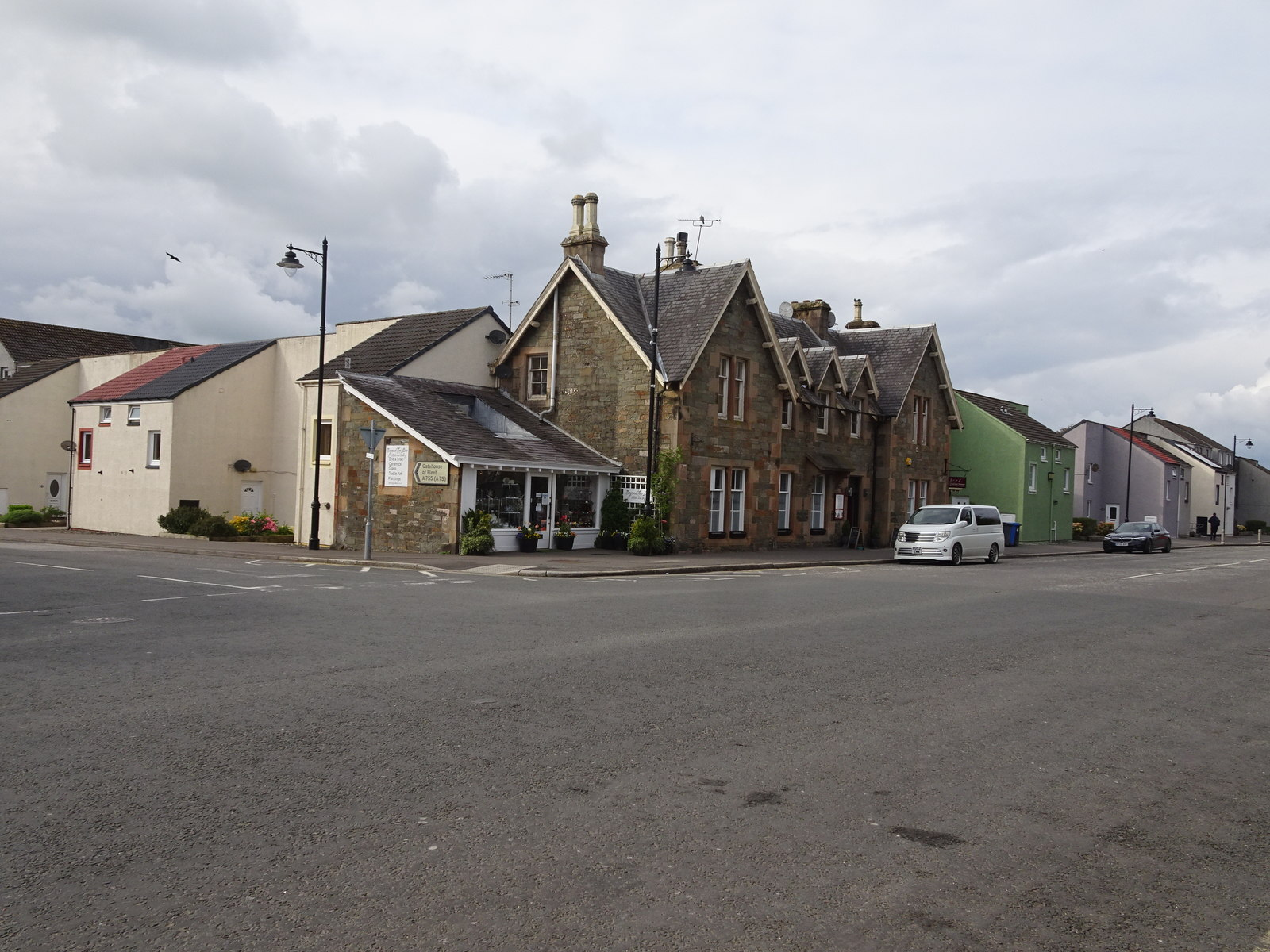
- The site of the station in 2019

General information
- Location: Kirkcudbright, Dumfries and Galloway; Scotland
- Coordinates: 54.8381°N 4.0479°W
- Grid reference: NX685511
- Platforms: 1

Other information
- Status: Disused

History
- Original company: Glasgow and South Western Railway
- Pre-grouping: Glasgow and South Western Railway
- Post-grouping: London, Midland and Scottish Railway; British Rail (Scottish Region)

Key dates
- 7 March 1864: Opened
- 3 May 1965: Closed
Location

Kirkcudbright railway station served the town of Kirkcudbright, Dumfries and Galloway, Scotland from 1864 to 1965 on the Kirkcudbright Railway.

== History ==
The station opened on 7 March 1864 by the Glasgow and South Western Railway. To the west, was the goods shed as well as its respective sidings and a cattle dock, which was built in 1894. To the north was the signal box, which opened in 1889, and a siding for the engine shed which was situated at the north end of the platform. In 1955 the engine shed closed and the signal box was replaced with a ground frame. The station closed to both passengers and goods traffic on 3 May 1965.

The station has since been converted into a café and cookery school.

Preceding station	Disused railways	Following station
Tarff; Line and station closed	Kirkcudbright Railway	Terminus
