= Ironmacannie Mill =

Watermill in Dumfries and Galloway, Scotland

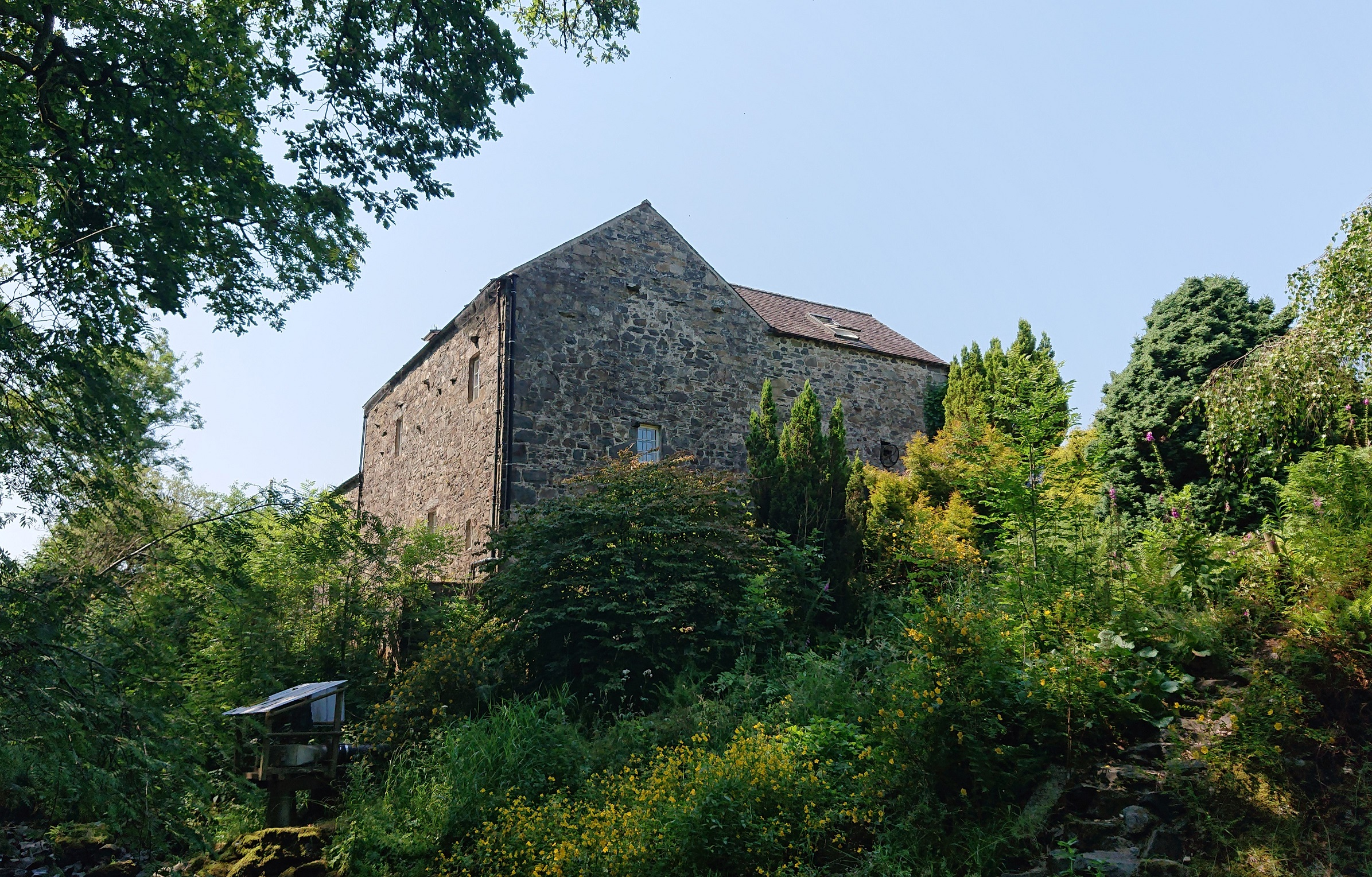
- Interactive map of the Ironmacannie Mill area

General information
- Type: Watermill
- Location: Near Balmaclellan, Dumfries and Galloway, Scotland
- Coordinates: 55°03′16″N 4°05′14″W

Technical details
- Material: Whinstone rubble

Design and construction
- Designations: Category A listed building

Ironmacannie Mill is a historic watermill near Balmaclellan in Dumfries and Galloway, Scotland. Built in the 18th and 19th centuries, on the site of an older mill, it retains a substantial amount of original gearing and machinery, and was designated a Category A listed building in 1971. It was converted for domestic use in the 1990s, and is currently used as holiday accommodation.

== Description ==
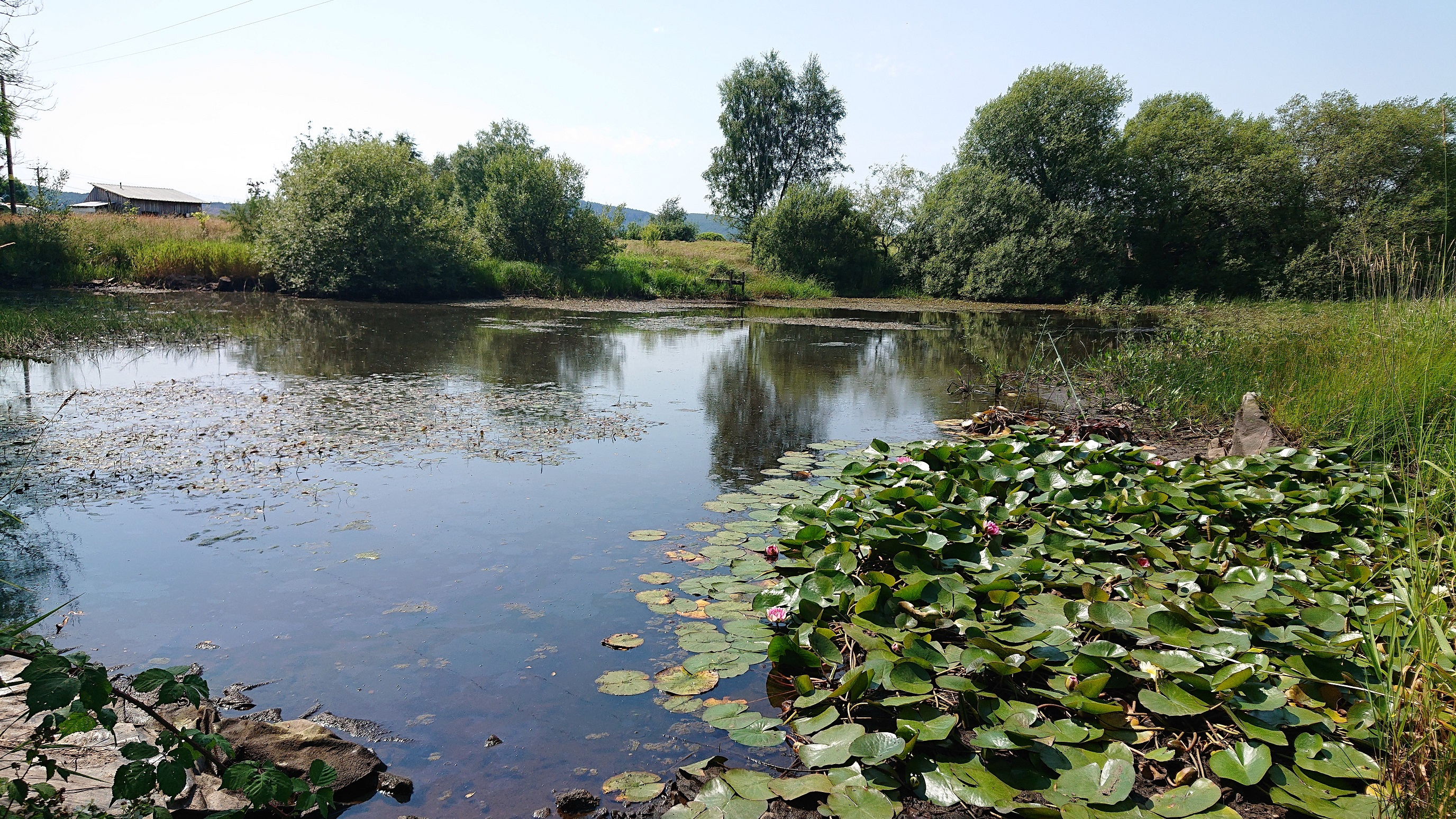
The millpond

The mill stands on a site about 2.4 miles (3.9 km) south of Balmaclellan, on the north bank of the Shirmers Burn. It is a three-story L-plan building, with rubble masonry made of locally mined whinstone. The windows are plain, and mostly in the south-east wall. Two cast iron waterwheels survive, fed via its mill races by water from a dam some 80 metres (260 ft) north of the mill. The larger wheel formerly drove the mill's three grinding stones, while the smaller one operated the bellows for the mill's kiln. There is now a micro hydro generator, providing power for the building.

== History ==
Most of the surviving structure dates to the nineteenth century, but the oldest parts of the building are late eighteenth-century, and it was built on the site of a much older mill. It was designated a Category A listed building in 1971; its designation describes it as being "remarkable for the survival of most of the internal gearing and machinery". In 1990, consent was granted to convert the building for use as domestic accommodation, while preserving the historic gear and machinery in-situ; work began shortly afterwards, and the building is currently used as holiday accommodation, marketed as The Hidden Mill.

== Sources ==
- "About". The Hidden Mill.
- Gillespie, Stuart (26 June 2008). "Gardens open for charity". The Daily Record. Scottish Daily Record and Sunday Mail Ltd.
- Gifford, John (1996). The Buildings of Scotland:Dumfries and Galloway. London: Penguin. ISBN 0140-71067-1.
- Historic Environment Scotland. "Ironmacannie Mill (Category A Listed Building LB3315)".
- Hume, John R (2000). Dumfries and Galloway: An Illustrated Architectural Guide. The Rutland Press. ISBN 1-873-190-344.
- "Ironmacannie Mill". Canmore. Historic Environment Scotland.
