= Water of Ken =

Coordinates: 55°04′N 4°09′W

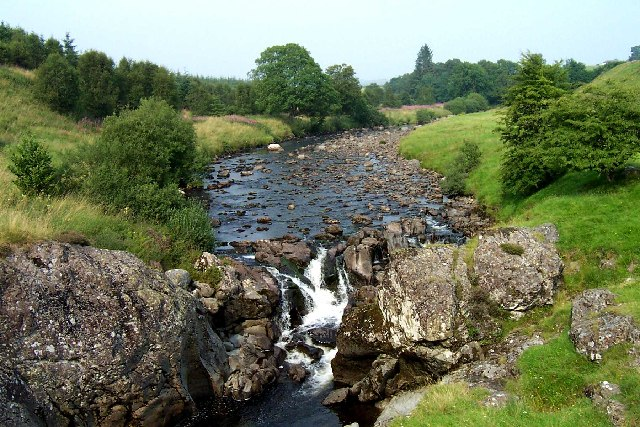
- The Water of Ken upstream from High Bridge of Ken

Location
- Country: Scotland

Physical characteristics
- Source
  - location: Blacklorg Hill
- Mouth
  - location: Loch Ken

Basin features
- Tributaries
  - left: Stroanfreggan Burn
  - right: Water of Deugh, Craigengillan Burn

The Water of Ken is a river in the historical county of Kirkcudbrightshire in Galloway, south-west Scotland.
It rises on Blacklorg Hill, north-east of Cairnsmore of Carsphairn in the Carsphairn hills, and flows south-westward into The Glenkens, passing through Kendoon, Carsfad and Earlstoun lochs, all of which are dammed to supply the Galloway Hydro Electric Scheme. At Kendoon Dam the Ken is joined by a major tributary the Water of Deugh. From there, the river flows south, passing St. John's Town of Dalry and New Galloway, before widening to form the 9-mile long Loch Ken.
The Black Water of Dee also enters halfway down the loch, and from Glenlochar, at the south end of the loch, the river continues as the Dee towards Kirkcudbright and the coast.
There are a number of interesting bridges over the Water of Ken. Smeaton's Bridge (sometimes Smitton's Bridge) carries the B729 road which runs between Carsphairn and Moniaive. It crosses the Ken a half mile above the confluence of the Stroanfreggan burn. This bridge has a single arch 42 ft long.
A few miles further downstream the High Bridge of Ken spans the river at a narrow ravine on the B7000 back road from Carsphairn to St John's Town of Dalry. The bridge has 2 arches each 24 ft long. British listed buildings website describes the bridge as early 18th century, possibly earlier origin.
Further downstream again the Ken Bridge lies between St John's Town of Dalry and New Galloway.This bridge carries the A712 road and dates from 1822. It has 5 granite arches and is 340 ft long. Immediately adjacent to the bridge is the Ken Bridge Hotel.

Photographs of the Ken
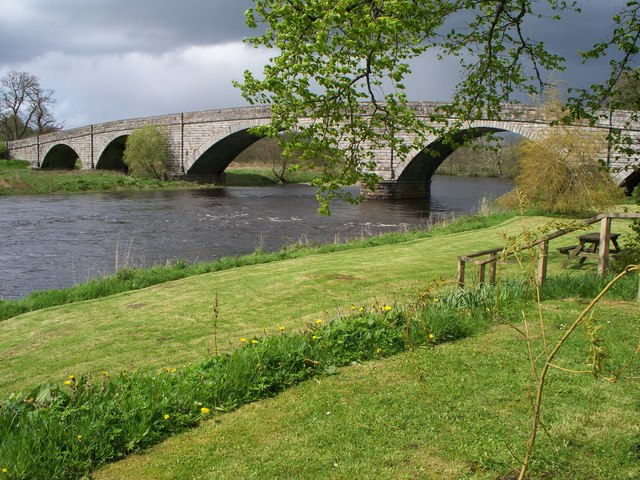
Ken Bridge, view from the 'beer garden' of The Ken Bridge Hotel

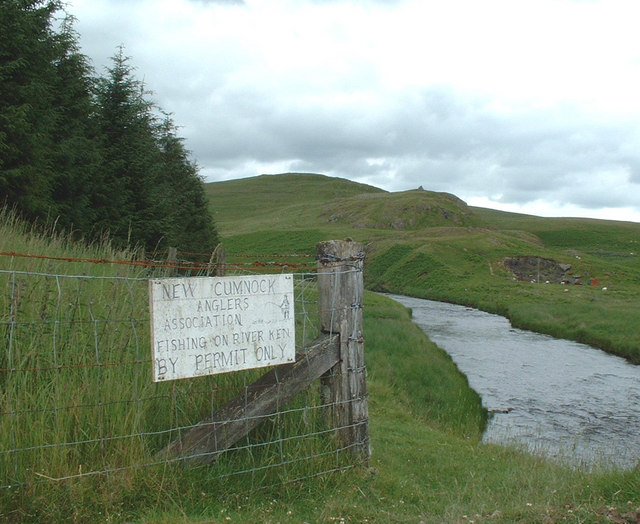
Water of Ken looking upstream from the Smeaton Bridge

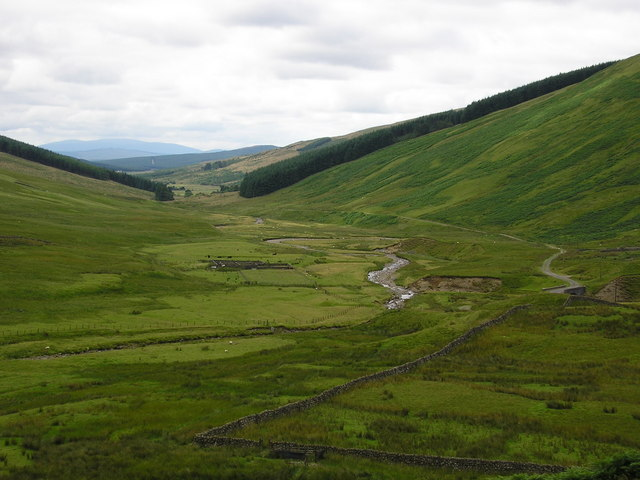
Water of Ken and bridge near Lorg

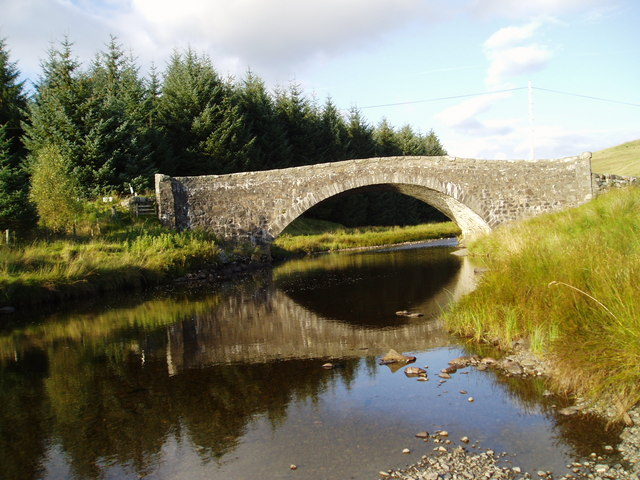
Smittons Bridge looking upstream

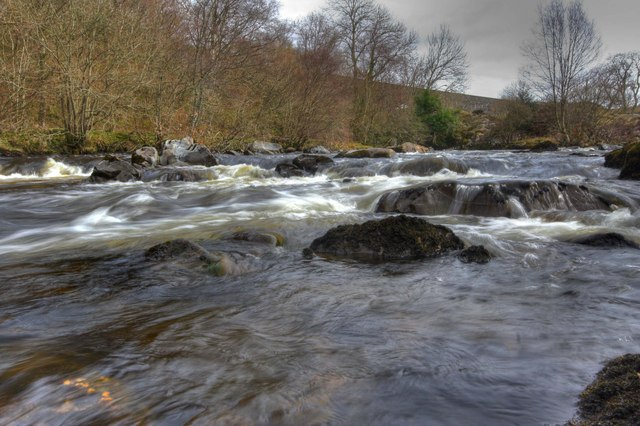
Water Of Ken looking upstream to the High Bridge

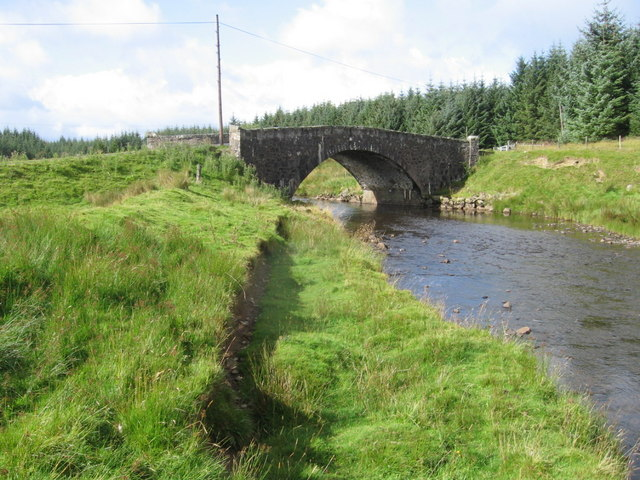
Water Of Ken looking downstream to the Smeaton Bridge

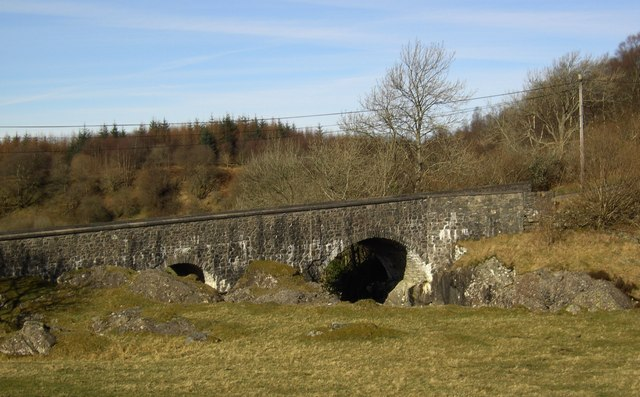
The High Bridge of Ken
