= Kirkcudbright Railway =

Former railway line in Scotland

Coordinates: 54°50′18″N 04°02′53″W

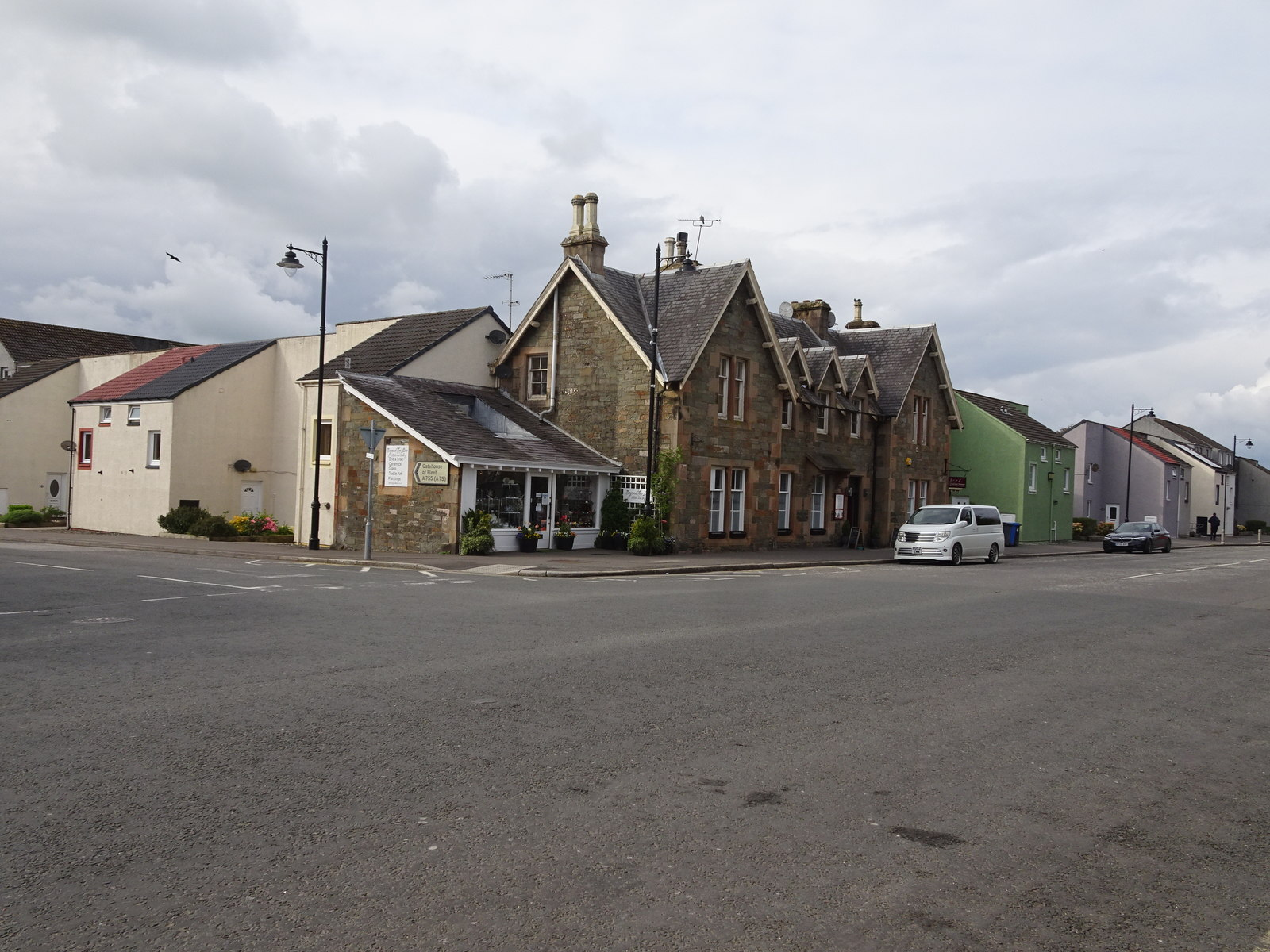
- Kirkcudbright railway station building

Overview
- Locale: Scotland
- Dates of operation: 1864–1965

Technical
- Track gauge: 4 ft 8 1/2 in (1,435 mm)

The Kirkcudbright Railway was a railway branch line linking Kirkcudbright to the Castle Douglas and Dumfries Railway at Castle Douglas. It opened in 1864, and closed in 1965.

== Formation and construction ==
By 1861 railways were at last being constructed in the thinly populated districts of South West Scotland. The Castle Douglas and Dumfries Railway (CD&DR) had opened in 1859, connecting with the much larger Glasgow and South Western Railway (G&SWR) at Dumfries, and the Portpatrick Railway, later to be the core of the Portpatrick and Wigtownshire Joint Railway, was being constructed with the intention of linking Portpatrick with the British mainline network and encouraging a ferry service to the north of Ireland.

Kirkcudbright Railway Act 1861
- Act of Parliament
- Parliament of the United Kingdom
- Long title: An Act for making a Railway from Kirkcudbright to Castle Douglas, and for other Purposes.
- Citation: 24 & 25 Vict. c. ccv

Dates
- Royal assent: 1 August 1861

Desiring the advantages of connection to the railway network, and fearing the loss of county town status to Castle Douglas, local interests in Kirkcudbright promoted the Kirkcudbright Railway to connect the town with Castle Douglas. The cost of construction was estimated at £40,000; the G&SWR was content to offer support for the scheme, and agreed to subscribe £15,000 if the CD&DR would subscribe £5,000. The Kirkcudbright Railway (KR) obtained its authorising act of Parliament, the Kirkcudbright Railway Act 1861 (24 & 25 Vict. c. ccv), on 1 August 1861. (Note: Date according to Smith and Carter; Ross says 2 August.)

The first general meeting of the new company did not take place until 25 October 1861. While construction was proceeding under Wylie & Peddie, the KR concluded an agreement with the G&SWR for the latter to work the line for 42½% of gross receipts after deduction of cartage costs. The construction was ready for a demonstration trip on 30 January 1864. The line opened to goods traffic on 17 February 1864 but the Board of Trade (BoT) Inspecting Officer declined to authorise passenger operation until the junction with the Portpatrick Railway was improved. The BoT had introduced a rule that junctions of single line railways must be made double-line at the point of connection, and the Castle Douglas junction did not comply. The line opened to passengers on 2 March 1864 between Kirkcudbright and a quickly-constructed station at St Andrew Street, Castle Douglas, short of the junction.

The planned entry to the junction at Castle Douglas was extremely sharp; and Kirkcudbright trains entering the station had to use a short length of Portpatrick Railway track; it appears that permission for this had not been properly obtained.

Signalling alterations were made at the Castle Douglas junction and a low speed restriction imposed, and through passenger running commenced on 15 August 1864. (Note: Detail from Smith, and Ross. Other references give different dates but Smith's account is backed up by a detailed logical explanation. Butt agrees the date of St Andrew Street but illogically gives a later date (7 March 1864) for Tarff and Kirkcudbright. Awdry simply gives 15 August and refers to the junction difficulty but not the temporary arrangement; Bradshaw's Directory and also Carter say the following day (16 August); Paterson refers only to the opening to goods traffic. However Ross gives 1 March as the start of the St Andrew Street passenger service.) Capital was £60,000 in shares with borrowing powers up to £20,000.

== Timetable ==
The 1895 public timetable shows seven trains each way except Sundays; one each way ran Mondays and Fridays only; the journey time was 25 minutes. The entire line between Dumfries and Kirkcudbright is shown as the "Kirkcudbright Branch".

A mid morning train from London St Pancras to Glasgow gave a connection at Dumfries for Castle Douglas. A note against Bridge of Dee, Tarff and Kirkcudbright stations states, "Passengers from South of Carlisle for these Stations will be conveyed by Special Train from Castle Douglas."

== Absorption and closure ==
The G&SWR absorbed a number of small companies that it had earlier sponsored, and this included the Kirkcudbright Railway; the change was ratified by the Glasgow and South-western Railway (Amalgamations) Act 1865 (28 & 29 Vict. c. ccxcviii) of 5 July 1865. The absorption became effective on 1 August 1865. The shareholders received a cash settlement of face value plus 5% for their shares.

Passenger traffic ceased on 3 May 1965. (Note: According to Holland, and Butt; Awdry gives 3 June 1965.)

== Topography ==
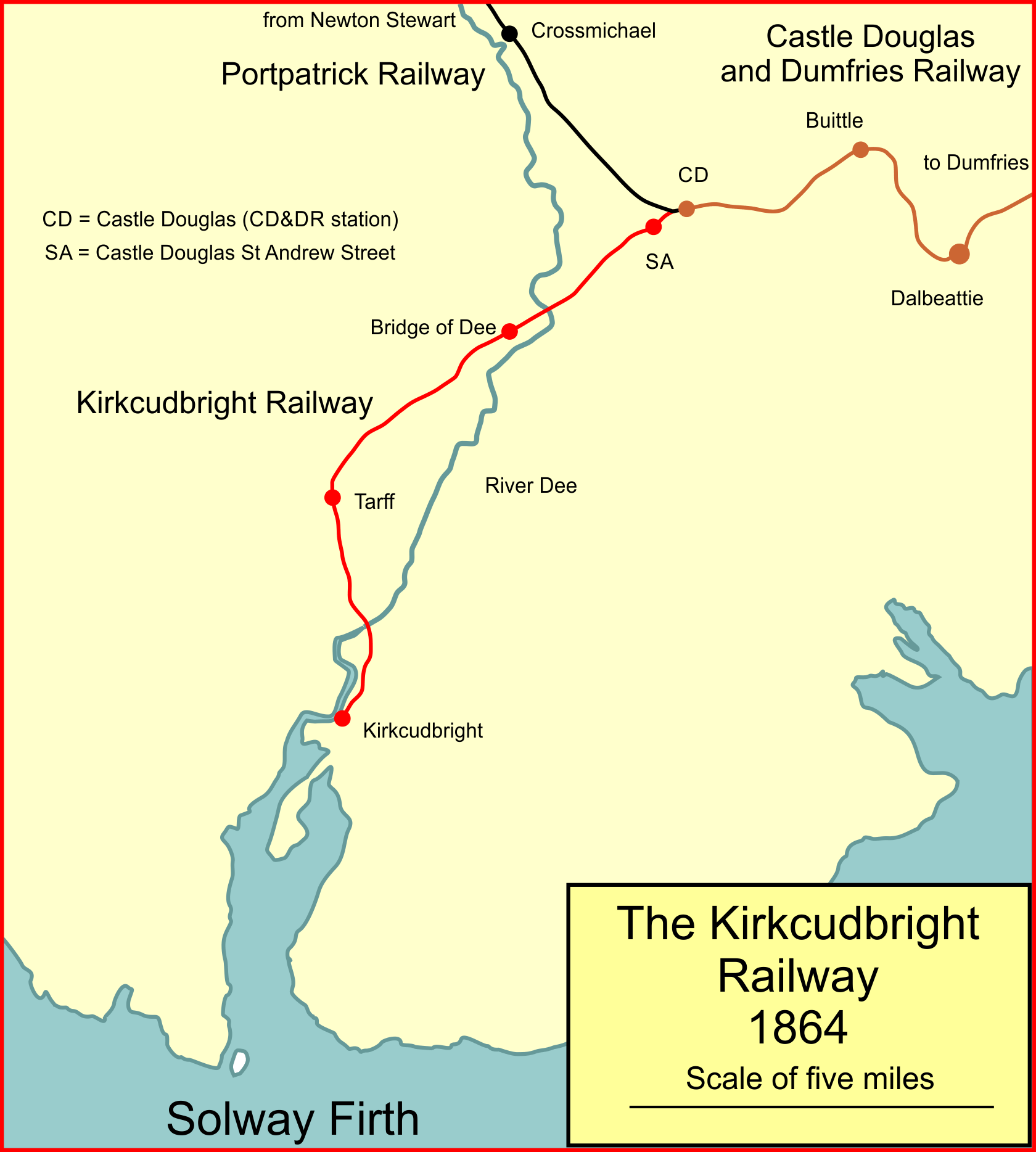
System map of the Kirkcudbright Railway

The line was a little over 10 miles (16 km) long.

The station at Kirkcudbright was on the east side of the River Dee; it had an all-over roof. The line ran north from Kirkcudbright, crossing the river at Tongueland Bridge (later spelt Tongland) and keeping to the west of the ridge that forms Bar Hill. After the station at Tarff, the line turns north-easterly crossing the Dee once again at Bridge of Dee. (In both cases the "bridge" in the name refers to an earlier road bridge.) It joined the Portpatrick Railway a little to the west of Castle Douglas station. The junction connection there originally joined the Portpatrick Railway line a short distance west of the station, by a very sharp curve. Improvements to the layout at the station took place some time before 1894, and the Kirkcudbright line then entered independently by a more gentle alignment, passing under a separate span of Dumfries Road bridge, which was widened for the purpose.

The stations were:

- Kirkcudbright; opened 2 March 1864; closed 3 May 1965;
- Tarff for Gatehouse; opened 2 March 1864; renamed Gatehouse 1 September 1865; renamed Tarff 1 August 1871; closed 3 May 1965;
- Bridge of Dee; opened 18 April 1864; closed 26 September 1949;
- Castle Douglas St Andrew Street; opened 2 March 1864; closed 1 December 1867;
- Castle Douglas – CD&DR station.

== See also ==
- List of closed railway stations in Britain
