= River Dee, Galloway =

Coordinates: 54.8034°N 4.06975°W

River Dee
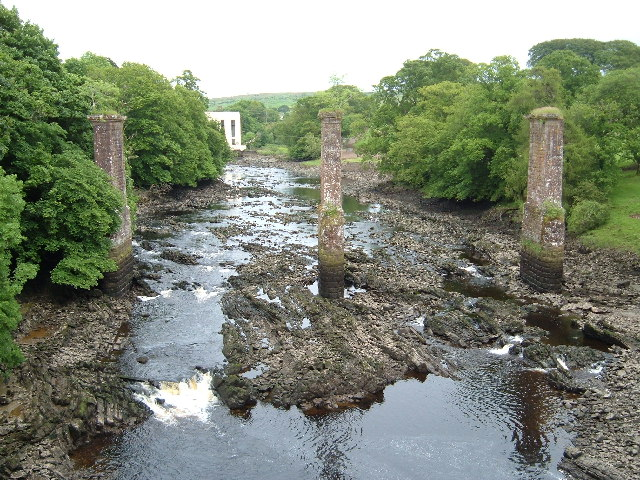
- View of the Dee at Tongland

Location
- Country: Scotland
- Region: Galloway
- Settlements: Kirkcudbright, Tongland, Bridge of Dee, Glenlochar, Crossmichael, Parton

Physical characteristics
- Source: Loch Dee
- Mouth: Kirkcudbright Bay
- Length: 61 km (38 mi)
- Basin size: 1,050 km^{2} (410 sq mi)
- Discharge
  - location: Solway Firth

Basin features
- Tributaries
  - left: Tarff Water
  - right: Water of Ken
- Protection status

Ramsar Wetland
- Official name: Loch Ken & River Dee Marshes
- Designated: 31 August 1992
- Reference no.: 568

The River Dee (Scottish Gaelic: Dè / Uisge Dhè), in south-west Scotland, flows from its source in Loch Dee amongst the Galloway Hills, firstly to Clatteringshaws Loch, then into Loch Ken, where it joins the Water of Ken. From there, the Dee flows 15 miles (24 km) southwards to Kirkcudbright, and into Kirkcudbright Bay to reach the Solway Firth. The distance is just over 38 miles (61 km) in total. Together with its tributaries, the Dee's total catchment area is over 400 square miles (1,000 km^{2}).

The river is dammed at Tongland, two miles (3 km) upriver from Kirkcudbright. This was constructed as part of the Galloway hydro-electric power scheme in the 1930s. Also at this site is Tongland Bridge, built in 1806 by Thomas Telford.

The ruins of Threave Castle stand on an island on the lower part of the Dee.

In Ptolemy's 2nd century work Geography it is recorded as Dēoúa. This form represents a development of Proto-Indo-European *deiueh_{2}- 'a goddess', which occurs in many Celtic river-names.

The Battle of the River Dee may have been fought at this river or at River Cree in 1308, during the Scottish Wars of Independence.

The Dee has also been known as the Black Water of Dee because of its dark colour in the stretch above Loch Ken.

Loch Ken and the Dee Marshes were together designated a Ramsar site on August 21, 1992.

== Tarff Water ==
The Tarff Water enters the Dee as a right-bank tributary near Tongland in the tidal stretch of the river. The headwater streams of the Tarff drain the tract of country between the villages of Laurieston and Ringford including Loch Mannoch. The river should not be confused with the similarly named Tarf Water which is a tributary of the River Bladnoch further west in Galloway.

The name Tarff derives from the Proto-Indo-European root *tauro- 'bull, aurochs'. Bulls occur frequently in Celtic river names, and these names may have had a mythological rather than literal referent. Like other examples of this name in southern Scotland, 'Tarff' is Gaelic in form but is likely to derive in turn from an earlier Cumbric cognate.

== See also ==
- Rivers of Scotland
