= Glenlochar =

Hamlet in the United Kingdom

Coordinates: 54.959°N 3.983°W

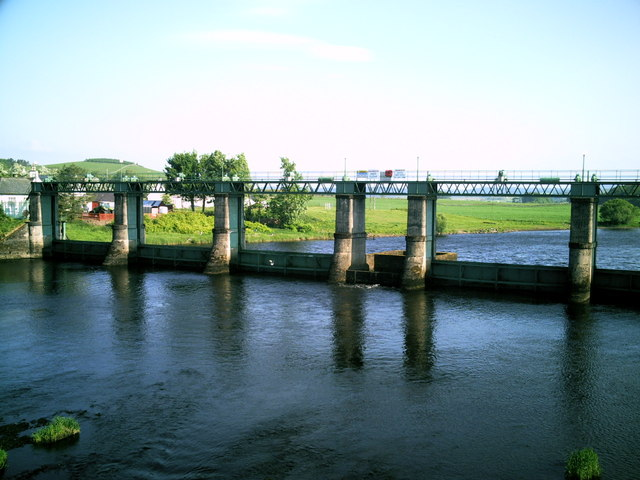
Glenlochar Barrage at end of Loch Ken

Glenlochar (Gd: Gleann Lochair) is a hamlet on the western bank of the River Dee in the parish of Balmaghie in the historical county of Kirkcudbrightshire in Dumfries and Galloway. Glenlochar is located one and a half miles south of Balmaghie Kirk and 3 miles (5 km) north of Castle Douglas.

== Etymology ==
Etymologically speaking, Glenlochar may be connected to the ancient name Loukopibía, and derived from the Brittonic -luch-, "marshy/brackish water" (Welsh llwch, Gaelic loch), or lǖch, "bright, shining", with the adjectival suffix -ar. The first part of the name is either Brittonic glïnn- (Welsh glyn) or Gaelic gleann, both meaning "a valley", anglicised as Scots glen.

== History ==
The buried remains of a large Roman fort exist on the eastern bank of the River Dee, opposite Glenlochar. The fort was built in 81 AD by the Governor Gnaeus Julius Agricola and enclosed an area roughly 7 acres (2.8 ha). Abbey Yard is the local name for the area containing the fort remains; this reflects the incorrect identification on Ordnance Survey maps prior to the 1940s as the site of an abbey.

During World War II Glenlochar was the site of a training camp for the construction of Bailey bridges. The concrete slab foundations of the camp are still visible. An unexploded bomb shell was found at the site and a controlled explosion was conducted in 2002.

== Amenities ==
Glenlochar has a small community hall which used to be the local school.

The Glenlochar Barrage on the River Dee is part of the Galloway Hydro Electric Scheme.

Glenlochar House is a late 18th/19th century Georgian house with its principal facade overlooking the River Dee.
