= New Galloway =

Coordinates: 55.073°N 4.139°W

New Galloway: Scottish Gaelic: Gall-Ghàidhealaibh Nuadh
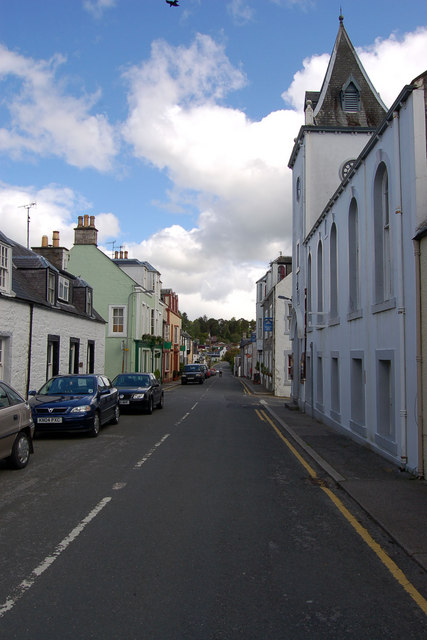
- New Galloway Town Hall (on the right)

- Location within Dumfries and Galloway
- OS grid reference: NX635775
- Council area: Dumfries and Galloway
- Lieutenancy area: The Stewartry of Kirkcudbright
- Country: Scotland
- Sovereign state: United Kingdom
- Post town: CASTLE DOUGLAS
- Postcode district: DG7
- Dialling code: 01644
- Police: Scotland
- Fire: Scottish
- Ambulance: Scottish
- UK Parliament: Dumfries and Galloway
- Scottish Parliament: Galloway and West Dumfries

New Galloway (Scottish Gaelic: Gall-Ghàidhealaibh Nuadh) is a small town in the historical county of Kirkcudbrightshire in Dumfries and Galloway, Scotland. It lies on the west side of the valley of the Water of Ken, 1 mile (2 kilometres) north of the end of Loch Ken. The town is approximately 71 miles (114 km) south-southwest of Edinburgh, 54 miles (87 km) south-southeast of Glasgow, and 21 miles (34 km) west of Dumfries.

With a population approximately estimated to be about 340 to 450 inhabitants, New Galloway is not only the smallest royal burgh before the local government reform of 1975, but it is Scotland's smallest town by population.

== History ==
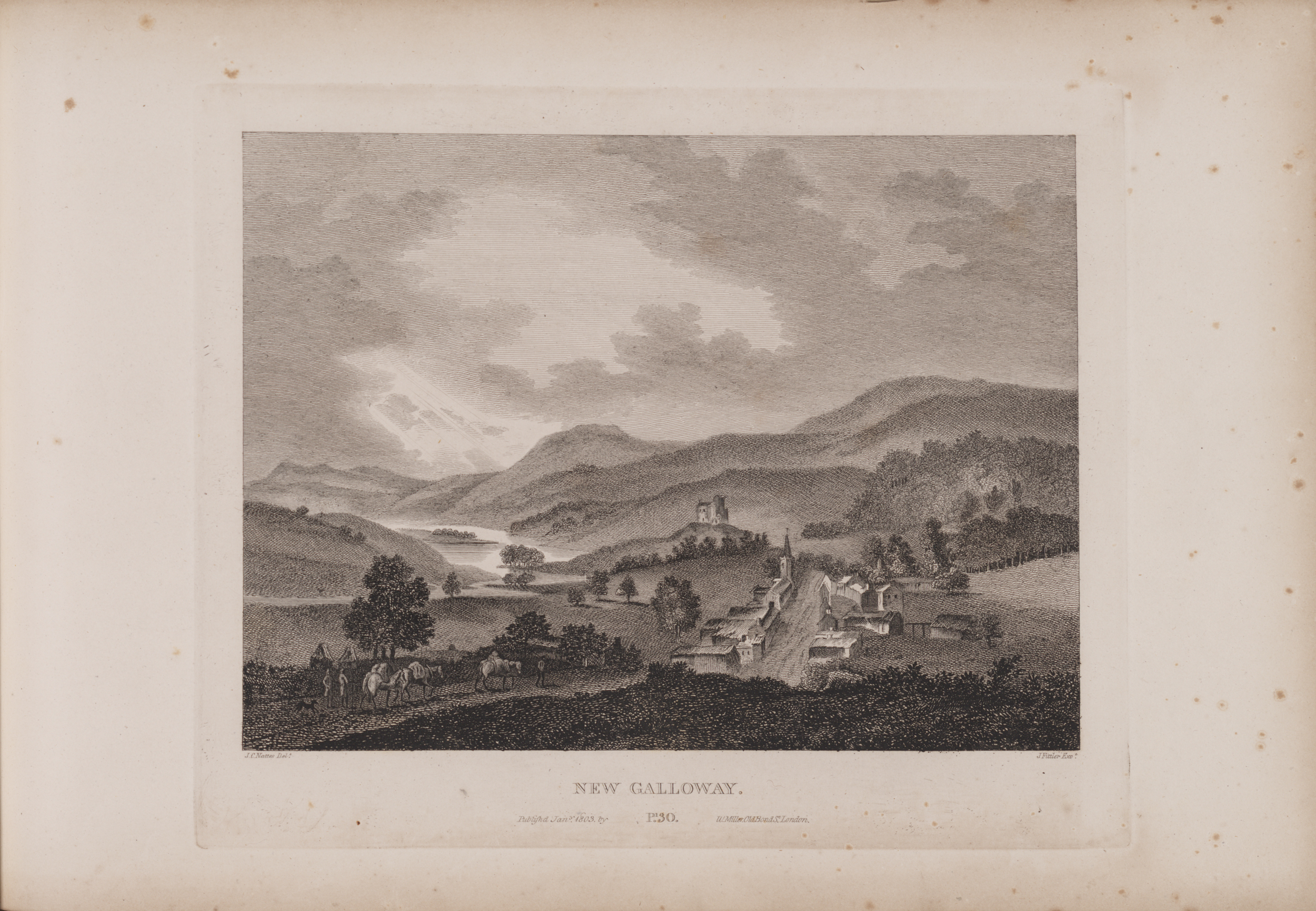
Engraving of a view of New Galloway by James Fittler in Scotia Depicta, published 1804

There were scattered settlements in the area from at least the 13th century (when the nearby Kenmure Castle was first built), but the village was formally founded in the 17th century by the Viscount of Kenmure and granted Royal Burgh status in 1630 – this was to enable it to serve as a market town. However, Kirkcudbright, only 19 miles (31 kilometres) to the south, was larger and drew more traders. New Galloway thus grew very slowly and is the smallest Royal Burgh in Scotland.

New Galloway today is a rural town. It has a Town Hall, the CatStrand Arts and Visitor Centre, two churches, three pubs, and a golf club. A popular holiday destination, standing on the edge of the scenic Galloway Forest Park, it is on the Galloway Kite Trail, where red kites can be spotted at all times of the year. Each August, it hosts the Scottish Alternative Games in its small park.

== Notable buildings ==
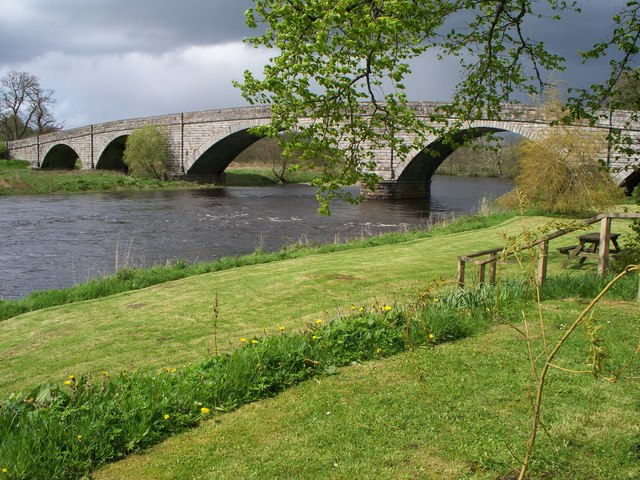
The Ken Bridge, built 1821 by John Rennie.

Notable buildings include:

- Kells Parish Church of Scotland, built in 1822 to a design by local architect William McCandlish. T-plan church with square tower at the centre of south wall. Interior reworked in 1911 following the original layout. The churchyard has three ‘Adam and Eve’ stones of 1706–7, and the grave of Captain John Gordon's gamekeeper at Kenmure Castle, John Murray, who caught the largest recorded pike in Loch Ken in 1774.
- Kenmure Castle, a fortified house or castle.
- Glenlee House, small 18th century house remodelled and enlarged in 1822 by architect Robert Lugar.
- St Margaret's Episcopalian Church was built in 1904 by W H Harrison, the chancel added in 1908 and the lychgate in 1912.
- The Ken Bridge, which links the town with the main road on the east side of the valley, was built between 1820 and 1821 by the Scottish engineer, John Rennie, who also built the second London Bridge and Waterloo Bridge.
- New Galloway Town Hall was restored in 1875.

== Notable people ==
Notable people include James Faed Jnr, (1856-1920) artist, son of James Faed: he lived and died at his home "The Bungalow".
