= Balmaclellan =

Coordinates: 55°05′18″N 04°06′46″W

Balmaclellan: Scottish Gaelic: Baile MhicIllFhaolain
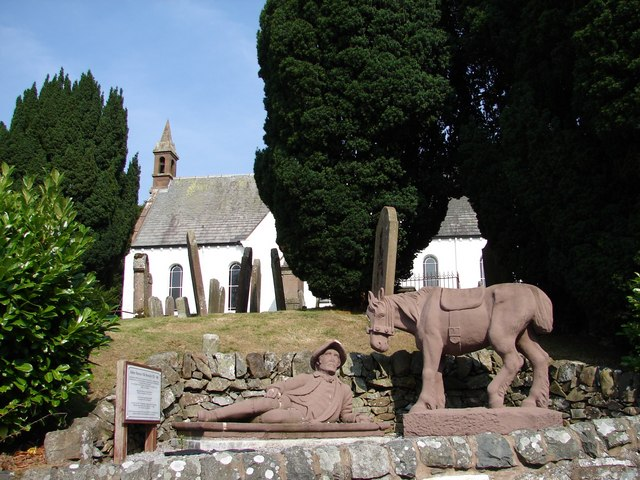
- Balmaclellan

- Location within Dumfries and Galloway
- OS grid reference: NX653791
- Council area: Dumfries and Galloway
- Lieutenancy area: Kirkcudbright
- Country: Scotland
- Sovereign state: United Kingdom
- Post town: CASTLE DOUGLAS
- Postcode district: DG7
- Police: Scotland
- Fire: Scottish
- Ambulance: Scottish
- UK Parliament: Dumfries and Galloway
- Scottish Parliament: Galloway and West Dumfries

Balmaclellan (Scottish Gaelic: Baile MhicIllFhaolain, meaning town of the MacLellans) is a small hillside village of stone houses with slate roofs in a fold of the Galloway hills in south-west Scotland. To the west, across the Ken River, the larger and more prosperous New Galloway lies below the Rhinns of Kells.

== Location and population ==
Balmaclellan is one of four parishes in the northern district of the Stewartry of Kirkcudbright. It contains 23,737 acres (96.1 km^{2}), of which about 4,000 acres (16 km^{2}) are cultivated. It includes areas of water, extensive plains of moss and about 300 acres (1.2 km^{2}) of tree plantation, but most of the land is used for sheep or cattle pasture. Many of the cattle are of the Galloway breed. The climate is temperate. Average monthly temperatures range from 1 to 7 °C (34 to 45 °F) in January, and 11 to 18 °C (52 to 64 °F) in July–August, with 984 mm (38.7 in) of rain yearly.

In 1887, John Bartholomew's Gazetteer of the British Isles described the inhabitants as "... of a mixed Gaelic and Germanic origin, and speak Braid Scots, a Northumbrian dialect of English. Those that profess a religion are generally but by no means entirely Calvinist Christians, adhering to the Church of Scotland or the Wee Frees". In 2009, of those who profess a religion in Balmaclellan most are Presbyterians adhering to the Church of Scotland.

The population was 554 in 1801, 634 in 1901, and 550 in 1951.

== History ==
Celtic relics have been found in the area, including a finely decorated mirror and crescent of the Bronze Age that is now in the National Museum of Scotland. The parish of Balmaclellan appears to have had an earlier British name, Treuercarcou, which appears in a thirteenth-century record of ecclesiastical taxes. The treu- part of this name is clearly the old northern British equivalent of modern Welsh tref, 'farmstead, dwelling', and car- is likely derived from caer meaning 'hill-fort', indicating an early settlement when this P-Celtic language was still spoken in the area.

The upper village has a 12th-century motte: the "Bal" of Balmaclellan. Barscobe Castle is just over a mile to the northeast, built in 1648 by William Maclellan, a fine example of the last phase of tower house building in Scotland.

Balmaclellan Parish Church was built in 1753, rebuilt in 1772 and added to in 1833 by local architect William McCandlish.

Balmaclellan was once a centre of the Covenanter religious movement. The village has a statue to Robert Paterson, Sir Walter Scott's 'Old Mortality'. His wife Elizabeth Gray established a school in the village, which can still be seen. She died in 1785 and is buried in the churchyard. Amongst other gravestones is that of another Covenanter, Robert Grierson, who was killed for his faith in 1685 (not to be confused with Sir Robert Grierson of Lag, notorious persecutor of the Galloway Covenanters).

The churchyard also contains what is probably the earliest civic war memorial in Scotland. It commemorates five men from Balmaclellan who died in the Crimean War.

They are:

- William Barr, Rifle Brigade
- James Gibson, 42nd Highlanders
- Joseph Gordon, Lance Cpl., Royal Sappers and Miners
- James McMichael, Lance Cpl., 46th Reg
- Thomas McRobert, Fusilier-Guards. [2]

A sixth man John Henry Upton Spalding Lt. RN., an officer who died at Sebastopol, is commemorated on his family's tombstone but not on the memorial itself.

Near the edge of the Balmaclellan churchyard there is a rough uninscribed whinstone pillar that looks like an ancient monument, and is locally said to mark the grave of a witch. Possibly the grave is that of Elspeth McEwen from nearby Dalry, who was found guilty of being a witch on her own confession and on the evidence of witnesses, and burned to death at Kirkcudbright in 1698. She was one of the last "witches" to be executed in Scotland.

To the south of the village, on the north bank of the Shimmers Burn, lies Ironmacannie Mill, a Category A listed watermill, which has been converted into a holiday cottage.

== Literary References ==
The Scots comedy, Torwatletie (1940), by playwright Robert McLellan, set during the Jacobite rising of 1715, depicts the household of a nominally fictional Laird of the district.

William Le Queux's novels The Czar's Spy (1905) and The Place of Dragons (1916) have scenes set in the area.

== Notable people ==
- Bridget D'Oyly Carte DBE, (1908–1985) frequent summer visitor to Barscobe Castle.
- Sir Hugh Wontner GBE CVO, (1908–1992) was an English hotelier director of the Savoy hotel and politician. Restored the 17th-century tower house of Barscobe Castle as his holiday home.
- Richard, 12th Lord Belhaven and Stenton (1903–1961) lived at Barlay House.
- Ethel Bristowe(1862–1952) was an artist and assyriologist. Lived at Craig, Balmaclellan. In 1938 she bequeathed an art gallery to the people of Castle Douglas along with many of her paintings. Buried in Balmaclellan Cemetery.
- Ian McCulloch, actor, starred in Survivors BBC 1975–77 and also starred in Italian Gialli horror films, lives with his wife the artist Mary-Clare Cornwallis at Balmaclellan.
- Sam Heughan (born 1980), actor, star of Outlander.
- Robert Paterson (stonemason) 1715–1810 "Old Mortality"
- J B Pick, 1921–2015, author, friend and biographer of Neil M Gunn.
- Professor Ted Cowan, FRSE, 1944–2022, formerly professor of Scottish history at the University of Glasgow and director of the university's Dumfries campus.
