= List of listed buildings in Dumfries and Galloway =

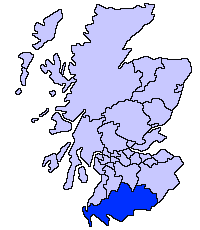
Dumfries and Galloway shown within Scotland

This is a list of listed buildings in Dumfries and Galloway. The list is split out by parish.

- List of listed buildings in Annan, Dumfries and Galloway
- List of listed buildings in Anwoth, Dumfries and Galloway
- List of listed buildings in Applegarth, Dumfries and Galloway
- List of listed buildings in Balmaclellan, Dumfries and Galloway
- List of listed buildings in Balmaghie, Dumfries and Galloway
- List of listed buildings in Borgue, Dumfries and Galloway
- List of listed buildings in Buittle, Dumfries and Galloway
- List of listed buildings in Caerlaverock, Dumfries and Galloway
- List of listed buildings in Canonbie, Dumfries and Galloway
- List of listed buildings in Carsphairn, Dumfries and Galloway
- List of listed buildings in Castle Douglas, Dumfries and Galloway
- List of listed buildings in Closeburn, Dumfries and Galloway
- List of listed buildings in Colvend And Southwick, Dumfries and Galloway
- List of listed buildings in Crossmichael, Dumfries and Galloway
- List of listed buildings in Cummertrees, Dumfries and Galloway
- List of listed buildings in Dalbeattie, Dumfries and Galloway
- List of listed buildings in Dalry, Dumfries and Galloway
- List of listed buildings in Dalton, Dumfries and Galloway
- List of listed buildings in Dornock, Dumfries and Galloway
- List of listed buildings in Dryfesdale, Dumfries and Galloway
- List of listed buildings in Dumfries, Dumfries and Galloway
- List of listed buildings in Dunscore, Dumfries and Galloway
- List of listed buildings in Durisdeer, Dumfries and Galloway
- List of listed buildings in Eskdalemuir, Dumfries and Galloway
- List of listed buildings in Ewes, Dumfries and Galloway
- List of listed buildings in Gatehouse Of Fleet, Dumfries and Galloway
- List of listed buildings in Girthon, Dumfries and Galloway
- List of listed buildings in Glasserton, Dumfries and Galloway
- List of listed buildings in Glencairn, Dumfries and Galloway
- List of listed buildings in Gretna, Dumfries and Galloway
- List of listed buildings in Half Morton, Dumfries and Galloway
- List of listed buildings in Hoddom, Dumfries and Galloway
- List of listed buildings in Holywood, Dumfries and Galloway
- List of listed buildings in Hutton And Corrie, Dumfries and Galloway
- List of listed buildings in Inch, Dumfries and Galloway
- List of listed buildings in Johnstone, Dumfries and Galloway
- List of listed buildings in Keir, Dumfries and Galloway
- List of listed buildings in Kells, Dumfries and Galloway
- List of listed buildings in Kelton, Dumfries and Galloway
- List of listed buildings in Kirkbean, Dumfries and Galloway
- List of listed buildings in Kirkcolm, Dumfries and Galloway
- List of listed buildings in Kirkconnel, Dumfries and Galloway
- List of listed buildings in Kirkcowan, Dumfries and Galloway
- List of listed buildings in Kirkcudbright, Dumfries and Galloway
- List of listed buildings in Kirkgunzeon, Dumfries and Galloway
- List of listed buildings in Kirkinner, Dumfries and Galloway
- List of listed buildings in Kirkmabreck, Dumfries and Galloway
- List of listed buildings in Kirkmahoe, Dumfries and Galloway
- List of listed buildings in Kirkmaiden, Dumfries and Galloway
- List of listed buildings in Kirkmichael, Dumfries and Galloway
- List of listed buildings in Kirkpatrick Durham, Dumfries and Galloway
- List of listed buildings in Kirkpatrick Irongray, Dumfries and Galloway
- List of listed buildings in Kirkpatrick-Fleming, Dumfries and Galloway
- List of listed buildings in Kirkpatrick-Juxta, Dumfries and Galloway
- List of listed buildings in Langholm, Dumfries and Galloway
- List of listed buildings in Leswalt, Dumfries and Galloway
- List of listed buildings in Lochmaben, Dumfries and Galloway
- List of listed buildings in Lochrutton, Dumfries and Galloway
- List of listed buildings in Lockerbie, Dumfries and Galloway
- List of listed buildings in Middlebie, Dumfries and Galloway
- List of listed buildings in Minnigaff, Dumfries and Galloway
- List of listed buildings in Mochrum, Dumfries and Galloway
- List of listed buildings in Moffat, Dumfries and Galloway
- List of listed buildings in Morton, Dumfries and Galloway
- List of listed buildings in Mouswald, Dumfries and Galloway
- List of listed buildings in New Abbey, Dumfries and Galloway
- List of listed buildings in New Galloway, Dumfries and Galloway
- List of listed buildings in New Luce, Dumfries and Galloway
- List of listed buildings in Newton Stewart, Dumfries and Galloway
- List of listed buildings in Old Luce, Dumfries and Galloway
- List of listed buildings in Parton, Dumfries and Galloway
- List of listed buildings in Penninghame, Dumfries and Galloway
- List of listed buildings in Penpont, Dumfries and Galloway
- List of listed buildings in Portpatrick, Dumfries and Galloway
- List of listed buildings in Rerrick, Dumfries and Galloway
- List of listed buildings in Ruthwell, Dumfries and Galloway
- List of listed buildings in Sanquhar, Dumfries and Galloway
- List of listed buildings in Sorbie, Dumfries and Galloway
- List of listed buildings in St Mungo, Dumfries and Galloway
- List of listed buildings in Stoneykirk, Dumfries and Galloway
- List of listed buildings in Stranraer, Dumfries and Galloway
- List of listed buildings in Terregles, Dumfries and Galloway
- List of listed buildings in Tinwald, Dumfries and Galloway
- List of listed buildings in Tongland, Dumfries and Galloway
- List of listed buildings in Torthorwald, Dumfries and Galloway
- List of listed buildings in Troqueer, Dumfries and Galloway
- List of listed buildings in Tundergarth, Dumfries and Galloway
- List of listed buildings in Twynholm, Dumfries and Galloway
- List of listed buildings in Tynron, Dumfries and Galloway
- List of listed buildings in Urr, Dumfries and Galloway
- List of listed buildings in Wamphray, Dumfries and Galloway
- List of listed buildings in Westerkirk, Dumfries and Galloway
- List of listed buildings in Whithorn, Dumfries and Galloway
- List of listed buildings in Wigtown, Dumfries and Galloway

== See also ==
- Scheduled monuments in Dumfries and Galloway
