= List of listed buildings in Glasserton, Dumfries and Galloway =

This is a list of listed buildings in the parish of Glasserton in Dumfries and Galloway, Scotland.

== List ==
Name	Location	Date Listed	Grid Ref. (Note: Sometimes known as OSGB36, the grid reference (where provided) is based on the British national grid reference system used by the Ordnance Survey. • "Guide to National Grid". Ordnance Survey. • "Get-a-map". Ordnance Survey.)	Geo-coordinates	Notes	LB Number (Note: Historic Environment Scotland assign a unique alphanumeric identifier to each designated site in Scotland, for listed buildings this always begins with "LB", for example "LB12345".)	Image
Glasserton West Lodge Known As Butlers Lodge				54°43′17″N 4°27′37″W	Category B	10139	Upload Photo
Old Place Of Monreith, Or Dowies, With Carriage House And Boundary Walls				54°45′22″N 4°31′01″W	Category A	10123	Upload another image
Physgill House				54°42′01″N 4°26′27″W	Category C(S)	10127	Upload Photo
Ravenstone Castle				54°46′02″N 4°28′27″W	Category A	10133	Upload Photo
Kirkmaiden Old Church And Burial Ground And Walled Churchyard				54°43′41″N 4°32′23″W	Category B	10122	Upload another image
Physgill House, Walled Garden And Stables				54°42′01″N 4°26′15″W	Category C(S)	10128	Upload Photo
Glasserton Parish Church Church Of Scotland Session House Churchyard Mausolea And Monuments				54°42′47″N 4°27′08″W	Category A	10137	Upload another image
Glasserton Mains Dovecot				54°42′41″N 4°27′34″W	Category B	10143	Upload Photo
Glasserton The Posting House				54°43′08″N 4°27′11″W	Category C(S)	10138	Upload Photo
Glasserton Home Farm Steading				54°42′40″N 4°27′28″W	Category C(S)	10140	Upload Photo
Ravenstone Kennels				54°45′53″N 4°28′26″W	Category C(S)	10134	Upload Photo
Stellock Farmhouse And Steadings				54°44′23″N 4°32′06″W	Category B	10136	Upload Photo
Ravenstone School				54°45′09″N 4°29′39″W	Category C(S)	10135	Upload Photo
Glasserton Kettle Cottage With Lamp Standard				54°43′09″N 4°27′12″W	Category C(S)	10141	Upload Photo
Glasserton Ninian House				54°43′08″N 4°27′13″W	Category C(S)	10142	Upload Photo
Glasserton Old Manse				54°42′45″N 4°26′29″W	Category C(S)	10144	Upload Photo

== Key ==
The scheme for classifying buildings in Scotland is:

- Category A: "buildings of national or international importance, either architectural or historic; or fine, little-altered examples of some particular period, style or building type."
- Category B: "buildings of regional or more than local importance; or major examples of some particular period, style or building type, which may have been altered."
- Category C: "buildings of local importance; lesser examples of any period, style, or building type, as originally constructed or moderately altered; and simple traditional buildings which group well with other listed buildings."

In March 2016 there were 47,288 listed buildings in Scotland. Of these, 8% were Category A, and 50% were Category B, with the remaining 42% being Category C.

== See also ==
- List of listed buildings in Dumfries and Galloway
