= List of listed buildings in Dornock, Dumfries and Galloway =

This is a list of listed buildings in the parish of Dornock in Dumfries and Galloway, Scotland.

== List ==
Name	Location	Date Listed	Grid Ref. (Note: Sometimes known as OSGB36, the grid reference (where provided) is based on the British national grid reference system used by the Ordnance Survey. • "Guide to National Grid". Ordnance Survey. • "Get-a-map". Ordnance Survey.)	Geo-coordinates	Notes	LB Number (Note: Historic Environment Scotland assign a unique alphanumeric identifier to each designated site in Scotland, for listed buildings this always begins with "LB", for example "LB12345".)	Image
Dornock Village, Millbrae, Hillridge				54°59′03″N 3°11′58″W	Category B	3785	Upload Photo
Dornock Village, Dornock Parish Church And Churchyard				54°58′57″N 3°12′14″W	Category B	3786	Upload Photo
Dornock Village, Dornock Town Farmhouse				54°58′58″N 3°12′10″W	Category B	3793	Upload Photo
Woodhall Houses And Steading				54°59′47″N 3°11′27″W	Category B	3779	Upload Photo
Stapleton Tower, Corn Drying Kiln				55°00′31″N 3°11′53″W	Category B	3783	Upload Photo
Dornock Village, Dornock Town, North Range Of Farm Steading (Adjoining Main Road)				54°58′59″N 3°12′06″W	Category C(S)	3784	Upload Photo
Robgill Bridge				55°02′08″N 3°10′45″W	Category B	3788	Upload Photo
Robgill Tower And Embankment Wall				55°02′01″N 3°10′42″W	Category B	3789	Upload Photo
Stapleton Tower				55°00′31″N 3°11′53″W	Category A	3782	Upload Photo
Eastriggs Village, St John's Episcopal Church				54°59′06″N 3°10′52″W	Category B	3787	Upload another image See more images
Robgill Tower, Walled Garden				55°01′57″N 3°10′46″W	Category C(S)	3790	Upload Photo
Robgill Tower, Stable Block				55°02′00″N 3°10′45″W	Category B	3791	Upload Photo
Robgill Tower, Lodge And Gatepiers				55°01′53″N 3°10′47″W	Category B	3780	Upload Photo
Stapleton Grange Farmhouse And Steading				55°00′10″N 3°12′16″W	Category B	3781	Upload Photo
Dornock Village, Dornock House, Old Farmhouse And Steading, Including Detached Tall West Block				54°58′59″N 3°11′36″W	Category A	3792	Upload Photo
Stapleton Tower, Lodge And Gatepiers				55°00′24″N 3°12′22″W	Category B	3778	Upload Photo

== Key ==
The scheme for classifying buildings in Scotland is:

- Category A: "buildings of national or international importance, either architectural or historic; or fine, little-altered examples of some particular period, style or building type."
- Category B: "buildings of regional or more than local importance; or major examples of some particular period, style or building type, which may have been altered."
- Category C: "buildings of local importance; lesser examples of any period, style, or building type, as originally constructed or moderately altered; and simple traditional buildings which group well with other listed buildings."

In March 2016 there were 47,288 listed buildings in Scotland. Of these, 8% were Category A, and 50% were Category B, with the remaining 42% being Category C.
