= List of listed buildings in Kirkpatrick Irongray, Dumfries and Galloway =

This is a list of listed buildings in the parish of Irongray, Dumfries and Galloway, Scotland.

== List ==
Name	Location	Date Listed	Grid Ref. (Note: Sometimes known as OSGB36, the grid reference (where provided) is based on the British national grid reference system used by the Ordnance Survey. • "Guide to National Grid". Ordnance Survey. • "Get-a-map". Ordnance Survey.)	Geo-coordinates	Notes	LB Number (Note: Historic Environment Scotland assign a unique alphanumeric identifier to each designated site in Scotland, for listed buildings this always begins with "LB", for example "LB12345".)	Image
West Cluden Farmhouse				55°05′51″N 3°39′54″W	Category C(S)	10348	Upload Photo
Kirkpatrick Irongray Parish Manse, Outbuildings And Gatepiers				55°05′50″N 3°42′10″W	Category C(S)	10349	Upload Photo
Hallhill Bridge (Over Cluden Water)				55°06′06″N 3°42′53″W	Category C(S)	10360	Upload Photo
High Grove Cottage				55°05′14″N 3°42′13″W	Category C(S)	10361	Upload Photo
Cornlee Bridge (Over Old Water)				55°05′23″N 3°49′26″W	Category C(S)	10355	Upload Photo
Rosebank Bridge (Over Old Water)				55°04′08″N 3°45′53″W	Category C(S)	10350	Upload Photo
Routin Bridge				55°05′58″N 3°44′49″W	Category B	10351	Upload another image See more images
Bonerick House				55°04′19″N 3°42′56″W	Category C(S)	10354	Upload Photo
Glenkiln Former Lodge To Mollance House				55°04′45″N 3°48′19″W	Category B	10358	Upload Photo
Irongray Bridge (Over Cluden Water)				55°05′57″N 3°41′56″W	Category B	10362	Upload another image See more images
West Cluden Cottage To North West Of Former Mill				55°05′50″N 3°39′46″W	Category C(S)	10347	Upload Photo
Drumpark East Lodge, Quadrant Walls And Gatepiers				55°06′09″N 3°45′50″W	Category B	10356	Upload Photo
Drumpark West Lodge				55°06′10″N 3°45′57″W	Category B	10357	Upload Photo
The Grove, House And Gatepiers				55°05′05″N 3°41′47″W	Category B	10359	Upload Photo
Skeoch Hill Monument				55°05′34″N 3°47′21″W	Category B	10352	Upload another image See more images
West Cluden Former Corn Mill				55°05′51″N 3°39′46″W	Category C(S)	10346	Upload Photo
Kirkpatrick Irongray Martyrs' Monument				55°05′59″N 3°42′36″W	Category B	10363	Upload another image See more images
Kirkpatrick Irongray Parish Church And Churchyard				55°05′55″N 3°42′06″W	Category B	10364	Upload another image See more images

== Key ==
The scheme for classifying buildings in Scotland is:

- Category A: "buildings of national or international importance, either architectural or historic; or fine, little-altered examples of some particular period, style or building type."
- Category B: "buildings of regional or more than local importance; or major examples of some particular period, style or building type, which may have been altered."
- Category C: "buildings of local importance; lesser examples of any period, style, or building type, as originally constructed or moderately altered; and simple traditional buildings which group well with other listed buildings."

In March 2016 there were 47,288 listed buildings in Scotland. Of these, 8% were Category A, and 50% were Category B, with the remaining 42% being Category C.
