= List of listed buildings in Holywood, Dumfries and Galloway =

This is a list of listed buildings in the parish of Holywood in Dumfries and Galloway, Scotland.

== List ==
Name	Location	Date Listed	Grid Ref. (Note: Sometimes known as OSGB36, the grid reference (where provided) is based on the British national grid reference system used by the Ordnance Survey. • "Guide to National Grid". Ordnance Survey. • "Get-a-map". Ordnance Survey.)	Geo-coordinates	Notes	LB Number (Note: Historic Environment Scotland assign a unique alphanumeric identifier to each designated site in Scotland, for listed buildings this always begins with "LB", for example "LB12345".)	Image
Nether Gribton Farmhouse Steading And Cottage				55°06′14″N 3°40′45″W	Category B	10527	Upload Photo
Newtonairds Lodge, Gates, Gatepiers And Railings				55°06′08″N 3°45′06″W	Category B	10529	Upload Photo
Newtonairds Former Stables				55°06′18″N 3°44′59″W	Category B	10530	Upload Photo
Rue Farm House And Barn				55°06′41″N 3°42′29″W	Category B	10533	Upload Photo
Holywood Parish Church And Churchyard				55°06′01″N 3°38′22″W	Category B	10209	Upload another image See more images
Holywood Station Road End Gatepiers (Formerly At Mabie House, Dumfries and Galloway				55°06′38″N 3°39′24″W	Category C(S)	10210	Upload Photo
Cowhill Lodges And Gatepiers				55°07′07″N 3°38′57″W	Category B	10197	Upload Photo
Newbridge Roadbridge Over Cluden Water (On Former Line Of A76)				55°05′43″N 3°38′55″W	Category B	10528	Upload Photo
Portrack House Summer House (Formerly Lodge To Mollance House)				55°07′42″N 3°39′55″W	Category B	10532	Upload Photo
Gribton House With Principal Gatepiers And Quadrant Walls				55°06′10″N 3°41′30″W	Category B	10205	Upload Photo
Dalawoodie Walled Garden Buildings To North Including Gardens Cottage				55°05′49″N 3°38′32″W	Category C(S)	10200	Upload Photo
Upper Cluden Farnhouse And Steading				55°06′09″N 3°40′00″W	Category B	6814	Upload Photo
Dalawoodie House				55°05′44″N 3°38′28″W	Category B	10199	Upload Photo
East Cluden Village Cluden Bank				55°05′45″N 3°39′29″W	Category B	10202	Upload Photo
1-4 (Numbers Inclusive) Old Schoolhouses (Former Holywood School)				55°06′12″N 3°38′41″W	Category C(S)	10534	Upload Photo
Steilston				55°06′23″N 3°43′55″W	Category C(S)	10535	Upload Photo
Stepford House, Morrington				55°07′02″N 3°46′56″W	Category B	13233	Upload Photo
Cairnview				55°06′25″N 3°42′15″W	Category C(S)	10195	Upload Photo
Cowhill Former Stables				55°07′36″N 3°38′45″W	Category B	10198	Upload Photo
Gribton Former Stable Block				55°06′09″N 3°41′33″W	Category B	10207	Upload Photo
Cowhill House Tower House Addition				55°07′39″N 3°38′52″W	Category B	10196	Upload Photo
Portrack House				55°07′46″N 3°39′59″W	Category C(S)	10531	Upload Photo
Dalawoodie Former Lodge Quadrant Walls And Gatepiers				55°05′50″N 3°38′50″W	Category B	10201	Upload Photo
East Cluden Village East Cluden Mill				55°05′50″N 3°39′36″W	Category C(S)	10203	Upload Photo
Fourmerkland Tower				55°06′33″N 3°42′45″W	Category A	10204	Upload another image See more images

== Key ==
The scheme for classifying buildings in Scotland is:

- Category A: "buildings of national or international importance, either architectural or historic; or fine, little-altered examples of some particular period, style or building type."
- Category B: "buildings of regional or more than local importance; or major examples of some particular period, style or building type, which may have been altered."
- Category C: "buildings of local importance; lesser examples of any period, style, or building type, as originally constructed or moderately altered; and simple traditional buildings which group well with other listed buildings."

In March 2016 there were 47,288 listed buildings in Scotland. Of these, 8% were Category A, and 50% were Category B, with the remaining 42% being Category C.
