= List of listed buildings in Torthorwald, Dumfries and Galloway =

This is a list of listed buildings in the civil parish of Torthorwald in Dumfries and Galloway, Scotland.

== List ==
Name	Location	Date listed	Grid ref. (Note: Sometimes known as OSGB36, the grid reference (where provided) is based on the British national grid reference system used by the Ordnance Survey. • "Guide to National Grid". Ordnance Survey. • "Get-a-map". Ordnance Survey.)	Geo-coordinates	Notes	LB number (Note: Historic Environment Scotland assign a unique alphanumeric identifier to each designated site in Scotland, for listed buildings this always begins with "LB", for example "LB12345".)	Image
Torthorwald Village Torthorwald Parish Church, Churchyard And Gatepiers				55°05′21″N 3°30′44″W	Category B	17153	Upload Photo
Torthorwald Village Mill Cottage				55°05′25″N 3°30′59″W	Category C(S)	17152	Upload Photo
Torthorwald Village Cruck Cottage				55°05′29″N 3°31′02″W	Category A	17157	Upload another image
Torthorwald Village Crossway House				55°05′24″N 3°30′57″W	Category C(S)	17158	Upload Photo
Shawrakes Bridge (Over Linns Burn)				55°03′34″N 3°30′09″W	Category C(S)	17174	Upload Photo
Drumbreg Farm North And East Steading Ranges And Former Horsemill				55°04′21″N 3°30′33″W	Category B	17172	Upload Photo
Racks Village Mossbank				55°03′16″N 3°31′08″W	Category C(S)	17173	Upload Photo

== Key ==
The scheme for classifying buildings in Scotland is:

- Category A: "buildings of national or international importance, either architectural or historic; or fine, little-altered examples of some particular period, style or building type."
- Category B: "buildings of regional or more than local importance; or major examples of some particular period, style or building type, which may have been altered."
- Category C: "buildings of local importance; lesser examples of any period, style, or building type, as originally constructed or moderately altered; and simple traditional buildings which group well with other listed buildings."

In March 2016 there were 47,288 listed buildings in Scotland. Of these, 8% were Category A, and 50% were Category B, with the remaining 42% being Category C.
