= List of listed buildings in Mouswald, Dumfries and Galloway =

This is a list of listed buildings in the civil parish of Mouswald in Dumfries and Galloway, Scotland.

== List ==
Name	Location	Date Listed	Grid Ref. (Note: Sometimes known as OSGB36, the grid reference (where provided) is based on the British national grid reference system used by the Ordnance Survey. • "Guide to National Grid". Ordnance Survey. • "Get-a-map". Ordnance Survey.)	Geo-coordinates	Notes	LB Number (Note: Historic Environment Scotland assign a unique alphanumeric identifier to each designated site in Scotland, for listed buildings this always begins with "LB", for example "LB12345".)	Image
Mouswald Grange Former Windmill Tower, Kiln Block And North East Range Of Steading (Former Granary)				55°02′47″N 3°29′00″W	Category B	17390	Upload another image
Mouswald Former Parish Manse And Gatepiers				55°02′28″N 3°28′18″W	Category B	17392	Upload Photo
Rockhall Hotel Monument				55°03′55″N 3°28′40″W	Category B	17386	Upload Photo
Mount Kedar Monument To Henry Duncan				55°01′47″N 3°27′13″W	Category A	17388	Upload Photo
Rockhall Hotel And Gatepiers				55°03′56″N 3°28′42″W	Category B	17393	Upload Photo
Brocklehirst, Including Terrace Steps				55°03′04″N 3°29′11″W	Category B	44185	Upload Photo
Mount Kedar Former Free Church Manse And Gatepiers				55°01′47″N 3°27′11″W	Category C(S)	17389	Upload Photo
Mouswald Parish Church, Churchyard And Gatepiers				55°02′23″N 3°27′52″W	Category C(S)	17391	Upload another image

== Key ==
The scheme for classifying buildings in Scotland is:

- Category A: "buildings of national or international importance, either architectural or historic; or fine, little-altered examples of some particular period, style or building type."
- Category B: "buildings of regional or more than local importance; or major examples of some particular period, style or building type, which may have been altered."
- Category C: "buildings of local importance; lesser examples of any period, style, or building type, as originally constructed or moderately altered; and simple traditional buildings which group well with other listed buildings."

In March 2016 there were 47,288 listed buildings in Scotland. Of these, 8% were Category A, and 50% were Category B, with the remaining 42% being Category C.
