= List of listed buildings in Glencairn, Dumfries and Galloway =

This is a list of listed buildings in the parish of Glencairn in Dumfries and Galloway, Scotland.

== List ==
Name	Location	Date Listed	Grid Ref. (Note: Sometimes known as OSGB36, the grid reference (where provided) is based on the British national grid reference system used by the Ordnance Survey. • "Guide to National Grid". Ordnance Survey. • "Get-a-map". Ordnance Survey.)	Geo-coordinates	Notes	LB Number (Note: Historic Environment Scotland assign a unique alphanumeric identifier to each designated site in Scotland, for listed buildings this always begins with "LB", for example "LB12345".)	Image
Crawfordton School East Lodge & Gatepiers				55°11′38″N 3°53′11″W	Category B	10344	Upload Photo
Kirkland Bridge Over Cairn Water				55°11′27″N 3°52′02″W	Category B	10310	Upload another image See more images
Kirkland Village Glencairn Parish Church				55°11′39″N 3°52′21″W	Category A	10312	Upload another image See more images
Kirkland Village Cottages				55°11′38″N 3°52′20″W	Category B	10322	Upload Photo
Kirkland, Signpost At Junction Of A702 And B729				55°11′33″N 3°51′59″W	Category B	50010	Upload Photo
Maxwelton House Summerhouse To South West Of House				55°11′13″N 3°51′10″W	Category B	10328	Upload Photo
Moniaive Village Broomfield House And Gatepiers				55°11′57″N 3°55′46″W	Category B	10332	Upload Photo
Craigdarroch House Garden Building (To North Of House)				55°11′48″N 3°58′45″W	Category B	10341	Upload Photo
Moniaive Village High Street George Hotel				55°11′51″N 3°55′08″W	Category B	10296	Upload Photo
Glenluiart Lodge, Outbuildings & Former Stables				55°11′47″N 3°56′38″W	Category B	10308	Upload Photo
Moniave Village North Street Cottages (Formerly Maccreary's Workshop:/Corner With High Street				55°11′51″N 3°55′16″W	Category B	10314	Upload Photo
Moniaive Village Broomfield Bank				55°11′59″N 3°55′46″W	Category B	10331	Upload Photo
Auchenchyne Bridge (Drive To Auchenchyne House Over Castlefairn Water)				55°10′01″N 3°57′46″W	Category C(S)	10335	Upload Photo
Caitloch House And Gatepiers				55°12′19″N 3°56′37″W	Category B	10338	Upload Photo
Moniaive Village, Dunreggan: Inver Cottage And W. Glencross				55°11′49″N 3°55′00″W	Category B	10292	Upload Photo
Dungalston Farmhouse (Caigdarroch Estate)				55°11′48″N 3°56′50″W	Category B	10305	Upload Photo
Tererran Bridge Over Dalwhat Water				55°12′34″N 3°57′37″W	Category C(S)	10319	Upload Photo
Craigdarroch, Sawmill Cottage				55°11′44″N 3°57′16″W	Category B	6771	Upload Photo
Maxwelton House Episcopal Chapel And Lych Gate				55°11′10″N 3°50′48″W	Category B	10325	Upload Photo
Maxwelton House Summer House Beside Cairn Water				55°10′47″N 3°51′12″W	Category B	10329	Upload Photo
Moniaive Village Ayr Street Carradale				55°11′51″N 3°55′18″W	Category C(S)	10330	Upload Photo
Moniaive Village Dunreggan Glen Afton Clochnaben Hillview And Cottages Between And Adjoining				55°11′50″N 3°55′00″W	Category C(S)	10334	Upload Photo
Barbuie Farmhouse And Steading				55°12′13″N 3°55′48″W	Category C(S)	10336	Upload Photo
Craigdarroch House Lodge Cottage And Gatepiers				55°11′48″N 3°58′12″W	Category C(S)	10342	Upload Photo
Ewanston House				55°11′49″N 3°56′09″W	Category B	10306	Upload Photo
Glenluiart House				55°11′48″N 3°56′34″W	Category A	10307	Upload another image
Kirkland Village Glencairn Parish Churchyard Including Gillespie Of Peelton Monument				55°11′39″N 3°52′21″W	Category B	10313	Upload Photo
Shankfoot Bridge (Loch Urr Road Over Castlefairn Water)				55°09′48″N 3°58′06″W	Category B	10317	Upload Photo
Snade Mill				55°09′52″N 3°48′48″W	Category B	10318	Upload Photo
Crawfordton School (Main Block)				55°11′42″N 3°53′33″W	Category B	10343	Upload Photo
Moniaive Village Dunreggan Former F.C. Manse And Stables				55°11′42″N 3°54′40″W	Category B	10294	Upload Photo
Kirkland Village Cairnside				55°11′34″N 3°52′15″W	Category C(S)	10311	Upload Photo
Maxwelton House North Gatepiers				55°11′20″N 3°50′55″W	Category C(S)	10326	Upload Photo
Moniaive Village Chapel Street Bank, Bank House And Gatepiers				55°11′49″N 3°55′12″W	Category B	10333	Upload Photo
Moniaive Village High Street Bridge A702 Over Dalwhat Water				55°11′52″N 3°55′07″W	Category B	10295	Upload Photo
Moniaive Village High Street/Ayr Street Tower House				55°11′51″N 3°55′17″W	Category C(S)	10297	Upload Photo
Moniaive Village Kilneiss House				55°11′53″N 3°55′41″W	Category A	10298	Upload Photo
Ingleston Martyrs' Monument				55°11′07″N 3°53′28″W	Category B	10309	Upload Photo
Moniaive Village Renwick Monument				55°11′54″N 3°55′53″W	Category C(S)	10315	Upload Photo
Kirkland Village Glencairn Parish Manse And Gatepiers				55°11′37″N 3°52′13″W	Category B	10321	Upload Photo
Lower Ingleston Gatepiers				55°11′14″N 3°53′36″W	Category B	10323	Upload Photo
Maxwelton House				55°11′15″N 3°51′06″W	Category B	10324	Upload Photo
Maxwelton House South Gatepiers				55°11′05″N 3°51′04″W	Category C(S)	10327	Upload Photo
Blackstone Bridge (Glenwhisk-Blackstone Road Over Castlefairn Water)				55°11′23″N 3°55′13″W	Category C(S)	10337	Upload Photo
Craigdarroch House				55°11′47″N 3°58′44″W	Category A	10340	Upload another image See more images
Old Crawfordton Farmhouse And Adjoining Vaulted Structure				55°10′47″N 3°51′40″W	Category B	10316	Upload Photo
Waulkmill Bridge A702 Over Craigdarroch Water				55°11′41″N 3°55′16″W	Category B	10320	Upload Photo
Castlefairn Bridge (A702 Over Castlefairn Water)				55°09′42″N 3°59′16″W	Category B	10339	Upload Photo
Moniaive Village Dunreggan Shell Of Former Free Church				55°11′43″N 3°54′40″W	Category C(S)	10293	Upload Photo

== Key ==
The scheme for classifying buildings in Scotland is:

- Category A: "buildings of national or international importance, either architectural or historic; or fine, little-altered examples of some particular period, style or building type."
- Category B: "buildings of regional or more than local importance; or major examples of some particular period, style or building type, which may have been altered."
- Category C: "buildings of local importance; lesser examples of any period, style, or building type, as originally constructed or moderately altered; and simple traditional buildings which group well with other listed buildings."

In March 2016 there were 47,288 listed buildings in Scotland. Of these, 8% were Category A, and 50% were Category B, with the remaining 42% being Category C.
