= List of listed buildings in Middlebie, Dumfries and Galloway =

This is a list of listed buildings in the civil parish of Middlebie in Dumfries and Galloway, Scotland.

== List ==
Name	Location	Date Listed	Grid Ref. (Note: Sometimes known as OSGB36, the grid reference (where provided) is based on the British national grid reference system used by the Ordnance Survey. • "Guide to National Grid". Ordnance Survey. • "Get-a-map". Ordnance Survey.)	Geo-coordinates	Notes	LB Number (Note: Historic Environment Scotland assign a unique alphanumeric identifier to each designated site in Scotland, for listed buildings this always begins with "LB", for example "LB12345".)	Image
Waterbeck Village, Templehill House Including Gatepiers				55°05′11″N 3°10′52″W	Category C(S)	16941	Upload Photo
Waterbeck Village, Waterbeck House And The Village Shop				55°05′13″N 3°10′54″W	Category C(S)	16943	Upload Photo
Scotsbrig Farmhouse And Steading				55°04′49″N 3°13′55″W	Category B	16955	Upload Photo
Waterbeck Village, Fulton Farm				55°05′16″N 3°10′42″W	Category C(S)	16958	Upload Photo
Middlebie Parish Church And Churchyard				55°04′25″N 3°13′55″W	Category B	16963	Upload Photo
Burnfoot Hall, Driveway Bridge				55°03′29″N 3°14′43″W	Category C(S)	16978	Upload Photo
Carruthers Farmhouse				55°06′53″N 3°10′26″W	Category B	16981	Upload Photo
Copper's Cottage Including Garden Wall				55°03′51″N 3°11′27″W	Category B	16982	Upload Photo
Waterbeck Village, Row Of Cottages (The Old Post Office The Cottage, Mr Miller, Smithy Old Grocery, (Mr Thomas, Mrs Gordon, Miss Byers)				55°05′13″N 3°10′55″W	Category B	16957	Upload Photo
Kirtleton Lodge				55°06′36″N 3°08′59″W	Category C(S)	16959	Upload Photo
Carruthers Old Churchyard (Crowdieknowe)				55°06′38″N 3°09′55″W	Category B	16980	Upload Photo
Waterbeck Village, Waterbeck Church And Manse And Gatepiers				55°05′15″N 3°10′56″W	Category C(S)	16942	Upload Photo
Kirkside (Former Manse)				55°04′30″N 3°14′00″W	Category B	16951	Upload Photo
Kirtlebridge Village, Kirtlebridge Railway Viaduct Over B722 And Kirtle Water				55°02′35″N 3°11′33″W	Category B	16953	Upload Photo
North Craigs Farmhouse And Steading				55°05′44″N 3°09′29″W	Category C(S)	16965	Upload Photo
Palmersgill Bridge				55°03′43″N 3°10′41″W	Category B	16966	Upload Photo
Pennershaughs Old Churchyard				55°03′27″N 3°14′33″W	Category B	16967	Upload Photo
Albie Aisle (Carlyle Family Aisle)				55°05′08″N 3°10′59″W	Category B	16970	Upload Photo
Albie Farmhouse And Steading				55°04′59″N 3°10′52″W	Category B	16971	Upload Photo
West Craigs Farm, Monument To Earl Grey				55°05′50″N 3°09′41″W	Category B	16944	Upload Photo
Eaglesfield Village, Sunnybrae Cottage				55°03′43″N 3°10′58″W	Category C(S)	16946	Upload Photo
Gowkhall Bridge				55°05′06″N 3°10′33″W	Category B	16948	Upload Photo
The Braes Farm House, Steading, Garden Wall And Gatepiers				55°02′52″N 3°11′32″W	Category B	16974	Upload Photo
Burnfoot Hall, Former Stables				55°03′39″N 3°14′41″W	Category C(S)	16977	Upload Photo
Kirtleton Former Stables And Dovecot				55°06′37″N 3°08′51″W	Category B	16954	Upload Photo
Lauriesclose, Former Church, Boundary Walls And Gatepiers				55°06′28″N 3°09′00″W	Category C(S)	16960	Upload Photo
Blacket Or Blackwood House, Stables And Gatepiers, At North And At Former East Drives				55°03′28″N 3°11′11″W	Category B	16972	Upload Photo
Burnfoot Hall Nursing Home (Formerly Rickerby School)				55°03′50″N 3°13′50″W	Category B	16976	Upload Photo
Eaglesfield Village, Sunnybrae House				55°03′44″N 3°10′56″W	Category B	16947	Upload Photo
Hass Farmhouse And Steading				55°04′59″N 3°12′19″W	Category B	16949	Upload Photo
Cushathill Farmhouse				55°03′56″N 3°12′36″W	Category B	16945	Upload Photo
Johnstone Ha'				55°03′54″N 3°13′05″W	Category B	16950	Upload Photo
Kirtle Bridge Village, Kirtle Bridge, Former Line Of A74				55°02′40″N 3°11′35″W	Category C(S)	16952	Upload Photo
Springkell West Lodge, Gatepiers And Quadrants				55°03′44″N 3°10′40″W	Category B	16956	Upload Photo
Mein Bridge (Formerly A74 Over Mein Water - Now By-Passed)				55°03′23″N 3°15′06″W	Category B	16961	Upload Photo
Mein Bridge Over Mein Water At Satur Mill				55°03′50″N 3°13′21″W	Category B	16962	Upload Photo
Nether Albie Farmhouse				55°04′52″N 3°10′38″W	Category B	16964	Upload Photo
Pennersaughs Farmhouse				55°03′26″N 3°14′20″W	Category C(S)	16968	Upload Photo
Pingle Farmhouse				55°05′42″N 3°04′00″W	Category C(S)	16969	Upload Photo
Broadlea				55°03′32″N 3°13′11″W	Category C(S)	16975	Upload Photo
Burnfoot Hall, Lodge And Gatepiers				55°03′27″N 3°14′34″W	Category C(S)	16979	Upload Photo

== Key ==
The scheme for classifying buildings in Scotland is:

- Category A: "buildings of national or international importance, either architectural or historic; or fine, little-altered examples of some particular period, style or building type."
- Category B: "buildings of regional or more than local importance; or major examples of some particular period, style or building type, which may have been altered."
- Category C: "buildings of local importance; lesser examples of any period, style, or building type, as originally constructed or moderately altered; and simple traditional buildings which group well with other listed buildings."

In March 2016 there were 47,288 listed buildings in Scotland. Of these, 8% were Category A, and 50% were Category B, with the remaining 42% being Category C.
