= List of listed buildings in Kirkmichael, Dumfries and Galloway =

This is a list of listed buildings in the parish of Kirkmichael in Dumfries and Galloway, Scotland.

== List ==
Name	Location	Date Listed	Grid Ref. (Note: Sometimes known as OSGB36, the grid reference (where provided) is based on the British national grid reference system used by the Ordnance Survey. • "Guide to National Grid". Ordnance Survey. • "Get-a-map". Ordnance Survey.)	Geo-coordinates	Notes	LB Number (Note: Historic Environment Scotland assign a unique alphanumeric identifier to each designated site in Scotland, for listed buildings this always begins with "LB", for example "LB12345".)	Image
Ross Mains				55°11′00″N 3°28′02″W	Category A	10353	Upload Photo
Kirkmichael House				55°10′29″N 3°33′06″W	Category B	10368	Upload Photo
1, 2 And 3 Corses				55°10′57″N 3°31′46″W	Category C(S)	10376	Upload Photo
Easter Parkgate Farmhouse And Steading				55°10′45″N 3°32′12″W	Category B	10380	Upload Photo
Courance House Garden Wall, Gatepiers And Railings				55°11′46″N 3°29′19″W	Category B	10377	Upload Photo
Kirkland Farmhouse And Former Dovecot				55°11′27″N 3°31′07″W	Category B	10383	Upload Photo
The Barony (Formerly Kirkmichael House - Now Part Of Agricultural College)				55°10′05″N 3°32′12″W	Category B	10418	Upload Photo
The Barony Walled Garden				55°09′58″N 3°32′06″W	Category B	10419	Upload Photo
The Barony Beechwood Lodge				55°10′06″N 3°31′58″W	Category B	10420	Upload Photo
Burrance House And Steading				55°11′52″N 3°30′09″W	Category B	10375	Upload Photo
Kirkmichael Parish Church And Churchyard				55°10′46″N 3°33′51″W	Category B	10369	Upload Photo
Dalfibble Farmhouse				55°09′32″N 3°30′03″W	Category B	10379	Upload Photo
Garvald Churchyard				55°11′52″N 3°30′28″W	Category C(S)	10382	Upload Photo
Cumrue Farmhouse And Former Cartshed/Barn				55°09′38″N 3°27′34″W	Category B	10378	Upload Photo

== Key ==
The scheme for classifying buildings in Scotland is:

- Category A: "buildings of national or international importance, either architectural or historic; or fine, little-altered examples of some particular period, style or building type."
- Category B: "buildings of regional or more than local importance; or major examples of some particular period, style or building type, which may have been altered."
- Category C: "buildings of local importance; lesser examples of any period, style, or building type, as originally constructed or moderately altered; and simple traditional buildings which group well with other listed buildings."

In March 2016 there were 47,288 listed buildings in Scotland. Of these, 8% were Category A, and 50% were Category B, with the remaining 42% being Category C.
