= List of listed buildings in Kirkpatrick-Juxta, Dumfries and Galloway =

This is a list of listed buildings in the parish of Kirkpatrick-Juxta in Dumfries and Galloway, Scotland.

== List ==
Name	Location	Date listed	Geo-coordinates	Notes	Category	LB number	Image
Beattock Village, Evan Bridge			55°18′38″N 3°27′20″W		C(S)	9907	Upload Photo
Chapel Farm Cottages And Fragments Of St Cuthbert's Chapel			55°20′05″N 3°27′40″W		B	9841	Upload Photo
Craigielands House			55°17′58″N 3°27′22″W		A	9842	Upload Photo
Craigielands, Former Stables			55°18′01″N 3°27′27″W		B	9847	Upload Photo
Skellywell Mill			55°18′50″N 3°27′36″W		C(S)	13324	Upload Photo
Kirkpatrick Juxta Former Parish Manse And Outbuildings			55°17′36″N 3°26′50″W		C(S)	9892	Upload Photo
Craigielands, Walled Garden And Gardener's House And Semi-Domed Alcove			55°17′49″N 3°27′16″W		B	9846	Upload Photo
Lochhouse Tower			55°18′57″N 3°26′55″W		B	9894	Upload Photo
Milton Farmhouse			55°17′32″N 3°25′38″W		C(S)	9896	Upload Photo
Beattock Village, Beattock House Hotel And Gatepiers To North And To South			55°18′34″N 3°27′09″W		B	9906	Upload Photo
Craigielands South Lodge And Gatepiers			55°17′45″N 3°27′01″W		B	9845	Upload Photo
Evan Bridge Near Auchen Castle			55°19′29″N 3°28′17″W		C(S)	9849	Upload Photo
Valenciennes			55°19′08″N 3°28′10″W		B	9897	Upload Photo
Beattock Village, Beattock School			55°18′18″N 3°27′05″W		C(S)	9840	Upload Photo
Auchen Castle Hotel And Garden Terrace Steps Balustrades			55°19′39″N 3°28′45″W		B	9889	Upload Photo
Longbedholm Bridge			55°20′29″N 3°29′31″W		C(S)	9895	Upload Photo
Beattock Village, Beattock Bridge			55°18′37″N 3°27′15″W		B	9905	Upload Photo
Beattock Village, The Old Brig Inn, Hotel And Outbuildings			55°18′38″N 3°27′18″W		A	9908	Upload another image See more images
Dyke Farmhouse			55°19′04″N 3°26′33″W		C(S)	9848	Upload Photo
Kirkpatrick-Juxta Parish Church And Churchyard			55°17′39″N 3°26′46″W		B	9850	Upload Photo
Langshawbush House, Coach House And Gatepiers			55°19′33″N 3°26′48″W		B	9893	Upload Photo
Beattock Village, Former Stationmaster's House			55°18′25″N 3°27′17″W		B	9839	Upload Photo
Kirkpartrick Juxta Parish Manse			55°17′36″N 3°26′46″W		C(S)	9891	Upload Photo
Auchen Castle Lodge, Gatepiers And Quadrants			55°19′27″N 3°28′33″W		B	9904	Upload Photo
Craigielands, Ice House			55°17′52″N 3°27′14″W		C(S)	9843	Upload Photo
Craigielands, North Lodge And Gatepiers			55°18′12″N 3°27′11″W		B	9844	Upload Photo

== Key ==
The scheme for classifying buildings in Scotland is:

- Category A: "buildings of national or international importance, either architectural or historic; or fine, little-altered examples of some particular period, style or building type."
- Category B: "buildings of regional or more than local importance; or major examples of some particular period, style or building type, which may have been altered."
- Category C: "buildings of local importance; lesser examples of any period, style, or building type, as originally constructed or moderately altered; and simple traditional buildings which group well with other listed buildings."

In March 2016 there were 47,288 listed buildings in Scotland. Of these, 8% were Category A, and 50% were Category B, with the remaining 42% being Category C.
