= List of listed buildings in Hoddom, Dumfries and Galloway =

This is a list of listed buildings in the parish of Hoddom in Dumfries and Galloway, Scotland.

== List ==
Name	Location	Date listed	Geo-coordinates	Notes	Category	LB number	Image
Hallguards Farmhouse			55°02′40″N 3°18′44″W		C(S)	10024	Upload Photo
Mein Bridge At Meinfoot			55°02′37″N 3°16′35″W		B	10037	Upload Photo
Burnswark Farmhouse			55°05′54″N 3°16′02″W		B	10042	Upload Photo
Castlebank Farmhouse			55°03′38″N 3°14′49″W		B	10043	Upload Photo
Cleuchead Bridge (Over Butcherbeck Burn)			55°01′16″N 3°15′52″W		B	10046	Upload Photo
Ecclefechan Village, High Street, Carlyle Place, Christopher A Jardine			55°03′30″N 3°15′54″W		C(S)	10049	Upload Photo
Knockhill House			55°03′12″N 3°18′24″W		B	10057	Upload Photo
Hoddom Mill House			55°02′55″N 3°19′57″W		B	10030	Upload Photo
Ecclefechan Village, 2 Church Street			55°03′33″N 3°15′55″W		B	10032	Upload Photo
St Kentigern's Churchyard			55°02′30″N 3°18′20″W		B	10039	Upload Photo
Ecclefechan Village, High Street, Carlyle Place, Mr R Telfer			55°03′33″N 3°15′52″W		B	10048	Upload Photo
Ecclefechan Village, Johnstone Church, Hall, Gatepiers And Railings			55°03′32″N 3°15′56″W		B	10052	Upload Photo
Ecclefechan Village, High Street, The Ecclefechan Hotel			55°03′36″N 3°15′55″W		C(S)	10062	Upload Photo
Former Hoddom Manse, Barn And Walled Garden			55°02′18″N 3°16′15″W		C(S)	10029	Upload Photo
Ecclefechan Village, 1 Church Street			55°03′33″N 3°15′56″W		B	10031	Upload Photo
Luce Churchyard And Irving Burial Vault			55°02′21″N 3°16′22″W		B	10035	Upload Photo
Ecclefechan Village, Former School, Playground Walls And Gatepiers			55°03′34″N 3°15′58″W		C(S)	10054	Upload Photo
Kirkconnel Hall Hotel, Driveway Bridge			55°03′53″N 3°16′05″W		C(S)	10056	Upload Photo
Ecclefechan Village, Hall Road, The Firs Including Coach House			55°03′41″N 3°16′04″W		C(S)	10059	Upload Photo
Ecclefechan Village, High Street, Arched House Including Carlyle's Birthplace			55°03′33″N 3°15′51″W		A	10065	Upload another image See more images
Hoddom Bridge			55°02′31″N 3°18′37″W		A	10026	Upload Photo
Ecclefechan Village, Johnstone Churchyard			55°03′30″N 3°15′58″W		B	10053	Upload Photo
Kirkconnel Hall Hotel, Tower Fragment And Boundary Wall And Gatepiers To West			55°03′54″N 3°15′58″W		C(S)	10055	Upload Photo
Ecclefechan Village, High Street, Old Post Office			55°03′35″N 3°15′52″W		B	10061	Upload Photo
Ecclefechan Village, High Street, Globe House Including Watson's Shop			55°03′36″N 3°15′56″W		C(S)	10063	Upload Photo
Ecclefechan Village, High Street, Garthwaite Place, Creelman (Painter) And Mrs Horsburgh			55°03′37″N 3°15′58″W		C(S)	10064	Upload Photo
Hoddom Cross, Smithy And Cottage			55°02′57″N 3°17′21″W		B	10028	Upload Photo
Shortrig Windmill Tower, Horsemill And Steading Ranges			55°03′24″N 3°18′51″W		A	10041	Upload Photo
Cleuchead House			55°01′20″N 3°15′53″W		B	10044	Upload Photo
Cleuchard Lodge And Gatepiers			55°01′30″N 3°15′39″W		B	10045	Upload Photo
Hoddom Church And Churchyard			55°02′58″N 3°17′15″W		B	10025	Upload another image
Graham's Hall, Farmhouse And Steading			55°03′32″N 3°15′14″W		B	10033	Upload Photo
Knockhill House, Stables			55°03′13″N 3°18′26″W		B	10034	Upload Photo
Shortrig Farmhouse			55°03′25″N 3°18′49″W		C(S)	10040	Upload Photo
Ecclefechan Village, High Street, P Quinn			55°03′33″N 3°15′52″W		C(S)	10050	Upload Photo
Ecclefechan Village, High Street, Carlyle House			55°03′34″N 3°15′50″W		B	10060	Upload Photo
Mainholm Farmhouse And Steading			55°02′56″N 3°19′20″W		C(S)	10036	Upload Photo
Meinfoot Farmhouse			55°02′33″N 3°16′43″W		C(S)	10038	Upload Photo
Ecclefechan Village, Statue Of Thomas Carlyle (On The Haggs)			55°03′41″N 3°16′11″W		B	10047	Upload Photo
Ecclefechan Village, High Street, Tennant House, Including Fraser's Shop			55°03′34″N 3°15′53″W		B	10051	Upload Photo

== Key ==
The scheme for classifying buildings in Scotland is:

- Category A: "buildings of national or international importance, either architectural or historic; or fine, little-altered examples of some particular period, style or building type."
- Category B: "buildings of regional or more than local importance; or major examples of some particular period, style or building type, which may have been altered."
- Category C: "buildings of local importance; lesser examples of any period, style, or building type, as originally constructed or moderately altered; and simple traditional buildings which group well with other listed buildings."

In March 2016 there were 47,288 listed buildings in Scotland. Of these, 8% were Category A, and 50% were Category B, with the remaining 42% being Category C.
