= List of listed buildings in Rerrick, Dumfries and Galloway =

This is a list of listed buildings in the civil parish of Rerrick, in Dumfries and Galloway, Scotland.

== List ==
Name	Location	Date Listed	Grid Ref. (Note: Sometimes known as OSGB36, the grid reference (where provided) is based on the British national grid reference system used by the Ordnance Survey. • "Guide to National Grid". Ordnance Survey. • "Get-a-map". Ordnance Survey.)	Geo-coordinates	Notes	LB Number (Note: Historic Environment Scotland assign a unique alphanumeric identifier to each designated site in Scotland, for listed buildings this always begins with "LB", for example "LB12345".)	Image
Dundrennan Old School And Adjoining School House				54°48′31″N 3°56′54″W	Category B	17074	Upload Photo
Orchardton House				54°51′33″N 3°51′15″W	Category B	17079	Upload Photo
Auchencairn, 45-47 (Odd Nos) Main Street				54°50′33″N 3°52′27″W	Category C(S)	17103	Upload Photo
Auchencairn, 49-51 (Odd Nos) Main Street				54°50′32″N 3°52′28″W	Category C(S)	17104	Upload Photo
Balcary Tower				54°49′38″N 3°49′40″W	Category C(S)	14880	Upload Photo
Hazelfield House				54°49′20″N 3°54′23″W	Category B	17077	Upload Photo
Auchencairn, 53 Main Street, (Kirkbrae)				54°50′32″N 3°52′29″W	Category C(S)	17105	Upload Photo
Balcary Lifeboat Station				54°49′32″N 3°49′34″W	Category B	17112	Upload Photo
Auchencairn, 6 And 8 Crocket Road				54°50′40″N 3°52′21″W	Category C(S)	17121	Upload Photo
Auchencairn, Main Street, Blairmae				54°50′30″N 3°52′31″W	Category C(S)	17122	Upload Photo
Auchencairn, 29 Main Street And 2 Wellwood Terrace				54°50′37″N 3°52′24″W	Category C(S)	19800	Upload Photo
Auchencairn, Craignair				54°50′32″N 3°52′19″W	Category C(S)	17083	Upload Photo
Port Mary House				54°47′17″N 3°56′36″W	Category B	17087	Upload Photo
Rerrick Old Churchyard And Ruins Of Old Church				54°48′00″N 3°55′49″W	Category B	17088	Upload Photo
Auchencairn, Mclure House				54°50′35″N 3°52′25″W	Category C(S)	17108	Upload Photo
Auchencairn, The Smugglers Inn				54°50′37″N 3°52′18″W	Category B	17109	Upload Photo
Dundrennan Parish Church Church Of Scotland				54°48′32″N 3°56′53″W	Category B	17075	Upload Photo
Dundrennan Abbey				54°48′24″N 3°56′50″W	Category A	17072	Upload another image
Auchencairn, Former Commercial Hotel				54°50′36″N 3°52′21″W	Category B	17081	Upload Photo
Auchencairn Church, Church Of Scotland				54°50′31″N 3°52′17″W	Category B	17082	Upload Photo
Auchencairn Lodge And Gatepiers To Auchencairn House				54°50′03″N 3°50′30″W	Category B	17111	Upload Photo
Auchencairn, 61 And 63 Main Street And Boundary Walls, (Viewfield And Kirklee)				54°50′30″N 3°52′31″W	Category C(S)	17106	Upload Photo
Auchencairn House				54°49′54″N 3°50′32″W	Category B	17110	Upload Photo
Orroland House				54°47′59″N 3°54′38″W	Category B	17086	Upload Photo
Dundrennan Bridge Over Abbey Burn One Quarter Of A Mile North East Of Dundrennan Abbey				54°48′32″N 3°56′40″W	Category B	17073	Upload Photo
Dundrennan Village Rerrickfield				54°48′23″N 3°56′56″W	Category B	17076	Upload Photo
Orchardton House Stables				54°51′31″N 3°51′19″W	Category B	17085	Upload Photo
Auchencairn, 31 Main Street				54°50′35″N 3°52′23″W	Category C(S)	17102	Upload Photo
Auchencairn, Main Street, Solwayside Guest House				54°50′35″N 3°52′22″W	Category B	17107	Upload Photo
Collin House				54°51′06″N 3°52′49″W	Category B	17113	Upload Photo

== Key ==
The scheme for classifying buildings in Scotland is:

- Category A: "buildings of national or international importance, either architectural or historic; or fine, little-altered examples of some particular period, style or building type."
- Category B: "buildings of regional or more than local importance; or major examples of some particular period, style or building type, which may have been altered."
- Category C: "buildings of local importance; lesser examples of any period, style, or building type, as originally constructed or moderately altered; and simple traditional buildings which group well with other listed buildings."

In March 2016 there were 47,288 listed buildings in Scotland. Of these, 8% were Category A, and 50% were Category B, with the remaining 42% being Category C.
