= List of listed buildings in Dalry, Dumfries and Galloway =

This is a list of listed buildings in the civil parish of Dalry in Dumfries and Galloway, Scotland. St John's Town of Dalry is the principal town in the civil parish of Dalry.

== List ==
Name	Location	Date Listed	Grid Ref. (Note: Sometimes known as OSGB36, the grid reference (where provided) is based on the British national grid reference system used by the Ordnance Survey. • "Guide to National Grid". Ordnance Survey. • "Get-a-map". Ordnance Survey.)	Geo-coordinates	Notes	LB Number (Note: Historic Environment Scotland assign a unique alphanumeric identifier to each designated site in Scotland, for listed buildings this always begins with "LB", for example "LB12345".)	Image
Smeatons Bridge Over Water Of Ken				55°12′08″N 4°08′58″W	Category B	3628	Upload Photo
Allangibbon Cottage				55°07′22″N 4°10′20″W	Category B	3643	Upload Photo
Dalry, 5-7 (Odd Nos) Main Street				55°06′19″N 4°09′55″W	Category B	3645	Upload Photo
Earlstoun Castle				55°07′52″N 4°10′39″W	Category A	3624	Upload Photo
Galloway Hydroelectric Power Scheme, Kendoon Power Station And Valve-House				55°09′53″N 4°11′27″W	Category B	51694	Upload Photo
Dalry, Dalry Manse				55°06′11″N 4°09′49″W	Category B	3620	Upload Photo
Ardoch				55°07′30″N 4°08′37″W	Category B	3644	Upload Photo
Grennan Mill				55°05′55″N 4°07′40″W	Category A	3625	Upload Photo
Halfmark Bridge Over Lochinvar Burn				55°07′05″N 4°06′33″W	Category B	3626	Upload Photo
Allangibbon Bridge				55°06′49″N 4°10′22″W	Category B	3642	Upload Photo
Dalry Parish Church And Churchyard (Church Of Scotland)				55°06′21″N 4°10′00″W	Category B	3621	Upload Photo
Dalry Parish Church Vestry (Church Of Scotland)				55°06′20″N 4°09′59″W	Category B	3622	Upload Photo
Galloway Hydroelectric Power Scheme, Kendoon Surge Tower				55°09′58″N 4°11′17″W	Category C(S)	51693	Upload Photo
Dalry, St John's Old Church				55°06′21″N 4°10′00″W	Category B	3623	Upload Photo
High Bridge Of Ken				55°11′13″N 4°10′11″W	Category B	3627	Upload Photo

== Key ==
The scheme for classifying buildings in Scotland is:

- Category A: "buildings of national or international importance, either architectural or historic; or fine, little-altered examples of some particular period, style or building type."
- Category B: "buildings of regional or more than local importance; or major examples of some particular period, style or building type, which may have been altered."
- Category C: "buildings of local importance; lesser examples of any period, style, or building type, as originally constructed or moderately altered; and simple traditional buildings which group well with other listed buildings."

In March 2016 there were 47,288 listed buildings in Scotland. Of these, 8% were Category A, and 50% were Category B, with the remaining 42% being Category C.
