= List of listed buildings in Kirkpatrick Durham, Dumfries and Galloway =

This is a list of listed buildings in the civil parish of Kirkpatrick Durham in Dumfries and Galloway, Scotland.

== List ==
| Name | Location | Date Listed | Grid Ref. (Note: Sometimes known as OSGB36, the grid reference (where provided) is based on the British national grid reference system used by the Ordnance Survey. • "Guide to National Grid". Ordnance Survey. • "Get-a-map". Ordnance Survey.) | Geo-coordinates | Notes | LB Number (Note: Historic Environment Scotland assign a unique alphanumeric identifier to each designated site in Scotland, for listed buildings this always begins with "LB", for example "LB12345".) | Image |
|---|---|---|---|---|---|---|---|
| Kirkpatrick-Durham, 1 Victoria Street | | | | 55°00′41″N 3°53′52″W | Category B | 10184 | Upload Photo |
| Kirkpatrick-Durham, 45 And 47 Victoria Street | | | | 55°00′41″N 3°53′39″W | Category B | 10185 | Upload Photo |
| Kirkpatrick-Durham, 50 Victoria Street | | | | 55°00′42″N 3°53′39″W | Category C(S) | 10187 | Upload Photo |
| Walton Park Stables, Dovecot, Horsemill And Walled Garden | | | | 55°01′03″N 3°56′19″W | Category B | 10193 | Upload Photo |
| Walton Park Lodge | | | | 55°01′06″N 3°56′05″W | Category B | 10194 | Upload Photo |
| Durhamhill House And Flanking Steadings | | | | 55°00′49″N 3°53′31″W | Category B | 9670 | Upload Photo |
| Brooklands, Ornamental Walling Opposite Brooklands Lodge | | | | 55°02′08″N 3°51′16″W | Category B | 9666 | Upload Photo |
| Corsock, Signpost At Junction Of A712 And B794 | | | | 55°03′35″N 3°55′52″W | Category B | 50001 | Upload Photo |
| Brooklands House And Walled Garden | | | | 55°02′18″N 3°51′45″W | Category B | 10176 | Upload Photo |
| Kirkpatrick-Durham, St David's Street Schoolhouse | | | | 55°00′50″N 3°53′45″W | Category C(S) | 10183 | Upload Photo |
| Kilquhanity School | | | | 55°00′51″N 3°55′55″W | Category B | 9656 | Upload Photo |
| Kirkpatrick-Durham Parish Church (Church Of Scotland) And Churchyard | | | | 55°00′32″N 3°53′58″W | Category B | 9657 | Upload Photo |
| Kirkpatrick-Durham, Beechgrove | | | | 55°00′51″N 3°53′45″W | Category C(S) | 9658 | Upload Photo |
| Brooklands Lodge | | | | 55°02′08″N 3°51′18″W | Category B | 9665 | Upload Photo |
| Crocketford, The Toll Cottage | | | | 55°02′09″N 3°49′47″W | Category B | 9669 | Upload Photo |
| Old Bridge Of Urr, Signpost At B794 Junction | | | | 54°59′22″N 3°54′44″W | Category B | 50002 | Upload Photo |
| Kirkpatrick-Durham 10 Victoria Street, Crown Hotel | | | | 55°00′42″N 3°53′49″W | Category B | 10186 | Upload Photo |
| Old Bridge Of Urr | | | | 54°59′20″N 3°54′53″W | Category B | 10190 | Upload Photo |
| Old Bridge Of Urr Mill | | | | 54°59′20″N 3°54′49″W | Category A | 10191 | Upload another image |
| Kirkpatrick-Durham, 1 St David's Street, Walton Road, Post Office, Savings Bank And Masonic Hall | | | | 55°00′42″N 3°53′53″W | Category B | 9659 | Upload Photo |
| Chipperkyle Stables And Dovecot | | | | 55°00′00″N 3°54′16″W | Category B | 9668 | Upload Photo |
| Kirkpatrick-Durham, 52 Victoria Street | | | | 55°00′42″N 3°53′38″W | Category C(S) | 10188 | Upload Photo |
| Kirkpatrick-Durham, 54 Victoria Street | | | | 55°00′42″N 3°53′37″W | Category B | 10189 | Upload Photo |
| Walton Park | | | | 55°01′03″N 3°56′15″W | Category B | 10192 | Upload Photo |
| Chipperkyle House | | | | 54°59′58″N 3°54′11″W | Category B | 9667 | Upload Photo |
| Kirkpatrick-Durham, 39 St David's Street | | | | 55°00′49″N 3°53′48″W | Category C(S) | 10182 | Upload Photo |
| Glaisters Bridge | | | | 55°06′00″N 3°57′08″W | Category B | 9654 | Upload Photo |
| Holmhead | | | | 55°03′48″N 3°55′55″W | Category B | 9655 | Upload Photo |
| Durham House (Former Manse) | | | | 55°00′38″N 3°53′58″W | Category B | 9660 | Upload Photo |
| Kirkpatrick-Durham 37 St David's Street | | | | 55°00′49″N 3°53′48″W | Category B | 9661 | Upload Photo |

== Key ==
The scheme for classifying buildings in Scotland is:

- Category A: "buildings of national or international importance, either architectural or historic; or fine, little-altered examples of some particular period, style or building type."
- Category B: "buildings of regional or more than local importance; or major examples of some particular period, style or building type, which may have been altered."
- Category C: "buildings of local importance; lesser examples of any period, style, or building type, as originally constructed or moderately altered; and simple traditional buildings which group well with other listed buildings."

In March 2016 there were 47,288 listed buildings in Scotland. Of these, 8% were Category A, and 50% were Category B, with the remaining 42% being Category C.
