= List of listed buildings in Kirkconnel, Dumfries and Galloway =

This is a list of listed buildings in the parish of Kirkconnel in Dumfries and Galloway, Scotland.

== List ==
Name	Location	Date Listed	Grid Ref. (Note: Sometimes known as OSGB36, the grid reference (where provided) is based on the British national grid reference system used by the Ordnance Survey. • "Guide to National Grid". Ordnance Survey. • "Get-a-map". Ordnance Survey.)	Geo-coordinates	Notes	LB Number (Note: Historic Environment Scotland assign a unique alphanumeric identifier to each designated site in Scotland, for listed buildings this always begins with "LB", for example "LB12345".)	Image
Kirkconnel Village Queensberry Hotel				55°23′15″N 4°00′18″W	Category B	10238	Upload Photo
The Knowe Farmhouse And Steading				55°23′30″N 4°01′29″W	Category B	10240	Upload Photo
Kirkconnel Village, Old Church House (Former Manse)				55°23′20″N 4°00′55″W	Category B	13345	Upload Photo
Kirkconnel Village Kirkconnel Parish Church & Churchyard				55°23′17″N 4°00′34″W	Category B	10237	Upload Photo
Kelloside				55°23′04″N 4°00′32″W	Category C(S)	10278	Upload Photo
The Holm				55°22′49″N 3°55′22″W	Category B	10276	Upload Photo
Crawick Bridge (A76 Over Crawick Water)				55°22′30″N 3°56′10″W	Category B	10291	Upload Photo
Kirkland Farmhouse				55°24′22″N 4°01′07″W	Category C(S)	10239	Upload Photo
Tower Farmhouse				55°23′09″N 3°57′55″W	Category B	10241	Upload Photo
Guildhall Bridge (A76 Over River Nith)				55°23′18″N 4°01′09″W	Category C(S)	10275	Upload Photo
Carco Farmhouse And Steading				55°24′16″N 3°54′58″W	Category C(S)	10290	Upload Photo

== Key ==
The scheme for classifying buildings in Scotland is:

- Category A: "buildings of national or international importance, either architectural or historic; or fine, little-altered examples of some particular period, style or building type."
- Category B: "buildings of regional or more than local importance; or major examples of some particular period, style or building type, which may have been altered."
- Category C: "buildings of local importance; lesser examples of any period, style, or building type, as originally constructed or moderately altered; and simple traditional buildings which group well with other listed buildings."

In March 2016 there were 47,288 listed buildings in Scotland. Of these, 8% were Category A, and 50% were Category B, with the remaining 42% being Category C.
