= List of listed buildings in Kirkpatrick-Fleming, Dumfries and Galloway =

This is a list of listed buildings in the parish of Kirkpatrick-Fleming in Dumfries and Galloway, Scotland.

== List ==
Name	Location	Date listed	Grid ref. (Note: Sometimes known as OSGB36, the grid reference (where provided) is based on the British national grid reference system used by the Ordnance Survey. • "Guide to National Grid". Ordnance Survey. • "Get-a-map". Ordnance Survey.)	Geo-coordinates	Notes	LB number (Note: Historic Environment Scotland assign a unique alphanumeric identifier to each designated site in Scotland, for listed buildings this always begins with "LB", for example "LB12345".)	Image
Springkell, Stables, Coach House, Groom's House, Kennels Cottage, Gates, Gatepiers, Boundary Wall And Railings				55°04′02″N 3°10′08″W	Category B	9784	Upload Photo
Williamsfield Farmhouse				55°01′21″N 3°06′04″W	Category C(S)	9785	Upload Photo
Kirtlebridge Village, Kirtle Bridge, On Former Line Of A74				55°02′40″N 3°11′35″W	Category C(S)	9795	Upload Photo
Langshaw Bridge				55°02′39″N 3°11′09″W	Category C(S)	9796	Upload Photo
Langshaw House				55°02′40″N 3°11′10″W	Category B	9797	Upload Photo
Langshaw Garden Walls And Gatepiers				55°02′40″N 3°11′09″W	Category B	9798	Upload Photo
Mossknowe, Garden Wall, Gateway And Shed At East				55°01′01″N 3°07′37″W	Category B	9800	Upload Photo
Mossknowe, Former Stables				55°01′02″N 3°07′39″W	Category B	9801	Upload Photo
Springkell, Cairnhill, Barn And Adjoining Kennels				55°03′50″N 3°09′20″W	Category B	9806	Upload Photo
Mossknowe House				55°01′02″N 3°07′33″W	Category A	9799	Upload Photo
Wyseby, Lodge And Gatepiers				55°02′36″N 3°11′15″W	Category B	9807	Upload Photo
Kirkpatrick Fleming Village, Notwen House And Gatepiers				55°01′34″N 3°08′10″W	Category B	9814	Upload Photo
Burnfoot Courtyard Block And Range To North West				55°03′35″N 3°10′22″W	Category B	9794	Upload Photo
Fairyknowe House And Outbuildings				55°03′51″N 3°08′56″W	Category B	9789	Upload Photo
Springkell, East Lodge, Gatepiers And Quadrants				55°03′50″N 3°09′03″W	Category C(S)	9783	Upload Photo
Springkell House				55°03′55″N 3°10′04″W	Category A	9805	Upload Photo
Wyseby, Former Stables With Dovecot				55°02′28″N 3°11′21″W	Category A	9808	Upload Photo
Grahamshill Farmhouse And Steading				55°01′12″N 3°07′07″W	Category B	9810	Upload Photo
Wyseby Mains Farmhouse And Steading				55°02′36″N 3°10′29″W	Category B	9792	Upload Photo
Palmersgill Bridge Over Kirtle Water				55°03′43″N 3°10′41″W	Category B	9803	Upload Photo
Kirkpatrick House, Farmhouse And Steading				55°01′14″N 3°08′07″W	Category B	9815	Upload Photo
Wyseby House				55°02′25″N 3°11′20″W	Category B	9787	Upload Photo
Cove House				55°01′24″N 3°09′00″W	Category B	9788	Upload Photo
Wyseby, Walled Garden				55°02′27″N 3°11′19″W	Category C(S)	9791	Upload Photo
Broats Farmhouse And Steading				55°00′37″N 3°10′17″W	Category B	9793	Upload Photo
Mossknowe, Former South Lodge				55°00′54″N 3°07′48″W	Category B	9802	Upload Photo
Kirkpatrick Fleming Parish Church And Churchyard Including Woodhouse Burial Enclosure				55°01′12″N 3°07′59″W	Category B	9812	Upload Photo
Gowkhall Bridge (Over Kirtle Water)				55°05′06″N 3°10′33″W	Category B	9790	Upload Photo
Branteth Farmhouse And Steading				55°04′00″N 3°07′28″W	Category B	9809	Upload Photo
Kirkpatrick Fleming Parish Churchyard, Graham Of Mossknowe Burial Enclosure				55°01′12″N 3°08′00″W	Category A	9813	Upload Photo

== Key ==
The scheme for classifying buildings in Scotland is:

- Category A: "buildings of national or international importance, either architectural or historic; or fine, little-altered examples of some particular period, style or building type."
- Category B: "buildings of regional or more than local importance; or major examples of some particular period, style or building type, which may have been altered."
- Category C: "buildings of local importance; lesser examples of any period, style, or building type, as originally constructed or moderately altered; and simple traditional buildings which group well with other listed buildings."

In March 2016 there were 47,288 listed buildings in Scotland. Of these, 8% were Category A, and 50% were Category B, with the remaining 42% being Category C.
