= List of listed buildings in Eskdalemuir, Dumfries and Galloway =

This is a list of listed buildings in the parish of Eskdalemuir in Dumfries and Galloway, Scotland.

== List ==
Name	Location	Date Listed	Grid Ref. (Note: Sometimes known as OSGB36, the grid reference (where provided) is based on the British national grid reference system used by the Ordnance Survey. • "Guide to National Grid". Ordnance Survey. • "Get-a-map". Ordnance Survey.)	Geo-coordinates	Notes	LB Number (Note: Historic Environment Scotland assign a unique alphanumeric identifier to each designated site in Scotland, for listed buildings this always begins with "LB", for example "LB12345".)	Image
Bankhead Burial Ground				55°15′20″N 3°10′38″W	Category B	9766	Upload Photo
Eskdalemuir Observatory Main Block (Office)				55°18′43″N 3°12′24″W	Category B	9775	Upload Photo
Eskdalemuir Observatory, Rayleigh House And Outbuildings				55°18′43″N 3°12′21″W	Category B	9735	Upload Photo
Eskdalemuir Observatory, The Vaults (Relative Underground Vault)				55°19′00″N 3°12′23″W	Category B	9777	Upload Photo
Glendearg Farm Bught (Sheep Fank), Above East Bank Of Tomleuchar Burn				55°20′28″N 3°11′57″W	Category B	9781	Upload Photo
Black Esk Bridge				55°12′19″N 3°10′36″W	Category C(S)	9767	Upload Photo
Eskdalemuir Observatory Schuster House (Both Dwellings)				55°18′43″N 3°12′27″W	Category B	9776	Upload Photo
Eskdalemuir Observatory Boundary Walls And Gatepiers				55°18′42″N 3°12′20″W	Category B	9778	Upload Photo
White Esk Bridge				55°16′05″N 3°10′29″W	Category B	9769	Upload Photo
Craighaugh Covenanter's Tomb ("Hislop's Grave")				55°16′34″N 3°11′07″W	Category B	9768	Upload Photo
Eskdalemuir Parish Church And Gatepiers				55°16′10″N 3°10′41″W	Category C(S)	9779	Upload Photo
Eskdalemuir Parish Churchyard				55°16′10″N 3°10′41″W	Category B	9780	Upload Photo
Nether Cassock				55°19′13″N 3°12′21″W	Category B	9782	Upload Photo

== Key ==
The scheme for classifying buildings in Scotland is:

- Category A: "buildings of national or international importance, either architectural or historic; or fine, little-altered examples of some particular period, style or building type."
- Category B: "buildings of regional or more than local importance; or major examples of some particular period, style or building type, which may have been altered."
- Category C: "buildings of local importance; lesser examples of any period, style, or building type, as originally constructed or moderately altered; and simple traditional buildings which group well with other listed buildings."

In March 2016 there were 47,288 listed buildings in Scotland. Of these, 8% were Category A, and 50% were Category B, with the remaining 42% being Category C.
