= List of listed buildings in Ruthwell, Dumfries and Galloway =

This is a list of listed buildings in the civil parish of Ruthwell in Dumfries and Galloway, Scotland.

== List ==
Name	Location	Date Listed	Grid Ref. (Note: Sometimes known as OSGB36, the grid reference (where provided) is based on the British national grid reference system used by the Ordnance Survey. • "Guide to National Grid". Ordnance Survey. • "Get-a-map". Ordnance Survey.)	Geo-coordinates	Notes	LB Number (Note: Historic Environment Scotland assign a unique alphanumeric identifier to each designated site in Scotland, for listed buildings this always begins with "LB", for example "LB12345".)	Image
Clarencefield Village Whitegate And Outbuilding To North, Farmer's Inn And Mr Hair				55°00′09″N 3°25′13″W	Category B	17214	Upload Photo
Comlongon Castle And Mansion House				55°00′24″N 3°26′27″W	Category A	17245	Upload Photo
Ruthwell Village Rivel Cottage And Outbuildings				54°59′36″N 3°24′30″W	Category B	17248	Upload Photo
Ruthwell Village Ruthwell Museum Henry Duncan Savings Bank And Museum				54°59′35″N 3°24′19″W	Category A	17249	Upload another image
Brow Well				54°59′37″N 3°25′54″W	Category C(S)	17212	Upload Photo
Summerfield Farmhouse And Steading				54°59′54″N 3°23′27″W	Category C(S)	17250	Upload Photo
Ruthwell Parish Church And Churchyard				55°00′01″N 3°24′27″W	Category B	17247	Upload another image
Aiket Farmhouse And Flanking Wings				54°59′59″N 3°24′52″W	Category C(S)	17210	Upload Photo
Margaretsfield Cottages				55°00′45″N 3°25′44″W	Category C(S)	17246	Upload Photo
Clarencefield Solway View, Mr D Graham And Roadside Cottage				55°00′10″N 3°25′14″W	Category C(S)	17213	Upload Photo

== Key ==
The scheme for classifying buildings in Scotland is:

- Category A: "buildings of national or international importance, either architectural or historic; or fine, little-altered examples of some particular period, style or building type."
- Category B: "buildings of regional or more than local importance; or major examples of some particular period, style or building type, which may have been altered."
- Category C: "buildings of local importance; lesser examples of any period, style, or building type, as originally constructed or moderately altered; and simple traditional buildings which group well with other listed buildings."

In March 2016 there were 47,288 listed buildings in Scotland. Of these, 8% were Category A, and 50% were Category B, with the remaining 42% being Category C.
