= List of listed buildings in Hutton and Corrie, Dumfries and Galloway =

This is a list of listed buildings in the parish of Hutton and Corrie in Dumfries and Galloway, Scotland.

== List ==
Name	Location	Date Listed	Grid Ref. (Note: Sometimes known as OSGB36, the grid reference (where provided) is based on the British national grid reference system used by the Ordnance Survey. • "Guide to National Grid". Ordnance Survey. • "Get-a-map". Ordnance Survey.)	Geo-coordinates	Notes	LB Number (Note: Historic Environment Scotland assign a unique alphanumeric identifier to each designated site in Scotland, for listed buildings this always begins with "LB", for example "LB12345".)	Image
Boreland House, Former Stables (Courtyard Ranges Only)				55°12′36″N 3°18′12″W	Category B	9909	Upload Photo
Corriestand Farmhouse And Steading				55°09′38″N 3°14′34″W	Category B	9914	Upload Photo
Whitecastles				55°10′20″N 3°12′22″W	Category C(S)	9876	Upload Photo
Boreland Village, Hutton And Corrie Parish Church, Churchyard And Gatepiers				55°12′17″N 3°18′18″W	Category A	9911	Upload Photo
Shaw House				55°12′20″N 3°19′17″W	Category B	9890	Upload Photo
Joiners Workshop/Former Smithy (Near Corrie Hall)				55°09′29″N 3°14′41″W	Category B	9913	Upload Photo
Craighouse Bridge (Over Corrie Water)				55°09′10″N 3°16′57″W	Category C(S)	9915	Upload Photo
Paddockhole Bridge (Over Water Of Milk)				55°08′20″N 3°12′35″W	Category C(S)	9917	Upload Photo
Boreland Village, Churchgate Cottage				55°12′18″N 3°18′16″W	Category C(S)	9910	Upload Photo
Gillesbie House				55°12′38″N 3°18′49″W	Category B	9916	Upload Photo
Shaw House, Sundial				55°12′19″N 3°19′17″W	Category C(S)	9875	Upload Photo

== Key ==
The scheme for classifying buildings in Scotland is:

- Category A: "buildings of national or international importance, either architectural or historic; or fine, little-altered examples of some particular period, style or building type."
- Category B: "buildings of regional or more than local importance; or major examples of some particular period, style or building type, which may have been altered."
- Category C: "buildings of local importance; lesser examples of any period, style, or building type, as originally constructed or moderately altered; and simple traditional buildings which group well with other listed buildings."

In March 2016 there were 47,288 listed buildings in Scotland. Of these, 8% were Category A, and 50% were Category B, with the remaining 42% being Category C.
