= List of listed buildings in Dryfesdale, Dumfries and Galloway =

This is a list of listed buildings in the parish of Dryfesdale in Dumfries and Galloway, Scotland.

== List ==
Name	Location	Date listed	Geo-coordinates	Notes	Category	LB number	Image
Dryfeholm West Lodge, including Workshops and Store			55°08′14″N 3°23′35″W		B	3442	Upload Photo
Hillside Cottage and former Dovecot (at Hillside House)			55°09′22″N 3°21′13″W		B	3445	Upload Photo
Johnstone Burial Ground			55°08′28″N 3°22′05″W		B	3446	Upload Photo
Lockerbie House Hotel			55°08′19″N 3°21′00″W		B	3447	Upload another image
Scroggs Mill and Mill Cottage			55°07′06″N 3°18′50″W		C(S)	3451	Upload Photo
Shillahill Bridge			55°06′45″N 3°24′10″W		A	3453	Upload another image See more images
Hallmuir, Ukrainian Chapel (Greek Catholic) with Memorial			55°05′58″N 3°22′01″W		B	49592	Upload another image
Bengall Farm, former Smithy			55°05′25″N 3°23′38″W		C(S)	3439	Upload Photo
Roberthill Farmhouse and adjoining Steading Blocks			55°06′09″N 3°23′28″W		B	3449	Upload Photo
Halldykes Farmhouse			55°07′49″N 3°19′26″W		B	3443	Upload Photo
Halldykes Farm Steading, East Range (Byre and Barn)			55°07′47″N 3°19′25″W		B	3444	Upload Photo
St Michael's House			55°08′51″N 3°21′14″W		B	3450	Upload Photo
Cudscroft			55°07′57″N 3°21′00″W		C(S)	3440	Upload Photo
Dryfeholm Farm, Long Haybarn (at North End Of Steading)			55°08′23″N 3°23′40″W		B	3441	Upload Photo
Muirhead Farmhouse			55°07′26″N 3°22′01″W		B	3448	Upload Photo

== Key ==
The scheme for classifying buildings in Scotland is:

- Category A: "buildings of national or international importance, either architectural or historic; or fine, little-altered examples of some particular period, style or building type."
- Category B: "buildings of regional or more than local importance; or major examples of some particular period, style or building type, which may have been altered."
- Category C: "buildings of local importance; lesser examples of any period, style, or building type, as originally constructed or moderately altered; and simple traditional buildings which group well with other listed buildings."

In March 2016 there were 47,288 listed buildings in Scotland. Of these, 8% were Category A, and 50% were Category B, with the remaining 42% being Category C.
