= List of listed buildings in Applegarth, Dumfries and Galloway =

This is a list of listed buildings in the parish of Applegarth in Dumfries and Galloway, Scotland.

== List ==
Name	Location	Date Listed	Grid Ref. (Note: Sometimes known as OSGB36, the grid reference (where provided) is based on the British national grid reference system used by the Ordnance Survey. • "Guide to National Grid". Ordnance Survey. • "Get-a-map". Ordnance Survey.)	Geo-coordinates	Notes	LB Number (Note: Historic Environment Scotland assign a unique alphanumeric identifier to each designated site in Scotland, for listed buildings this always begins with "LB", for example "LB12345".)	Image
Fourmerkland Lodge				55°09′55″N 3°24′23″W	Category B	3336	Upload Photo
Balgray House				55°09′50″N 3°20′55″W	Category B	3331	Upload Photo
Balgray House, Former Stables And Garage				55°09′48″N 3°21′04″W	Category B	3333	Upload Photo
Hewk Cottages				55°11′10″N 3°20′30″W	Category C(S)	3338	Upload Photo
Johnstone Bridge (A74 Over River Annan)				55°12′43″N 3°24′52″W	Category B	3342	Upload Photo
Lammonbie Bridge				55°09′43″N 3°21′14″W	Category B	3343	Upload Photo
Millbank Farmhouse				55°09′10″N 3°21′46″W	Category C(S)	3344	Upload Photo
Dinwoodie Lodge Hotel				55°11′56″N 3°24′32″W	Category B	6367	Upload Photo
Muirhousehead Farmhouse And Steading				55°09′02″N 3°23′10″W	Category C(S)	3326	Upload Photo
Balgray Home Farm Cottages				55°09′59″N 3°20′29″W	Category B	3330	Upload Photo
Balgray House, Lodge And Gatepiers				55°09′44″N 3°21′02″W	Category C(S)	3332	Upload Photo
Dinwoodie Green Farmhouse				55°10′55″N 3°24′14″W	Category C(S)	3335	Upload Photo
Hewk House And Outbuildings				55°11′04″N 3°20′34″W	Category B	3337	Upload Photo
Jardine Hall Stable Block				55°10′36″N 3°24′50″W	Category A	3340	Upload Photo
Millhousebridge Village, Millhouse Bridge				55°09′21″N 3°24′24″W	Category A	3324	Upload Photo
Muirhouse Farmhouse And Steading				55°08′45″N 3°22′48″W	Category C(S)	3325	Upload Photo
Old Tollbar Cottage At Dinwoodie				55°11′51″N 3°24′31″W	Category A	3327	Upload another image
Sibbaldbie Old Churchyard				55°10′34″N 3°20′31″W	Category B	3328	Upload Photo
Applegarth Parish Church, Jardine Burial Enclosure And Churchyard Walls And Gatepiers				55°08′42″N 3°24′24″W	Category B	3329	Upload Photo
Jardine Hall, Mineral Railway Bridge And Subsidiary Span To East Bank (Corncockle Railway)				55°10′29″N 3°25′14″W	Category B	3339	Upload Photo
Millhousebridge Village, Clock Lodge				55°09′21″N 3°24′19″W	Category B	3323	Upload Photo
Balgray House, Walled Garden				55°09′50″N 3°21′04″W	Category B	3334	Upload Photo
Jardine Hall, Walled Garden And Gateways				55°10′37″N 3°24′58″W	Category A	3341	Upload Photo

== Key ==
The scheme for classifying buildings in Scotland is:

- Category A: "buildings of national or international importance, either architectural or historic; or fine, little-altered examples of some particular period, style or building type."
- Category B: "buildings of regional or more than local importance; or major examples of some particular period, style or building type, which may have been altered."
- Category C: "buildings of local importance; lesser examples of any period, style, or building type, as originally constructed or moderately altered; and simple traditional buildings which group well with other listed buildings."

In March 2016 there were 47,288 listed buildings in Scotland. Of these, 8% were Category A, and 50% were Category B, with the remaining 42% being Category C.
