= List of listed buildings in Ewes, Dumfries and Galloway =

This is a list of listed buildings in the parish of Ewes in Dumfries and Galloway, Scotland.

== List ==
Name	Location	Date Listed	Grid Ref. (Note: Sometimes known as OSGB36, the grid reference (where provided) is based on the British national grid reference system used by the Ordnance Survey. • "Guide to National Grid". Ordnance Survey. • "Get-a-map". Ordnance Survey.)	Geo-coordinates	Notes	LB Number (Note: Historic Environment Scotland assign a unique alphanumeric identifier to each designated site in Scotland, for listed buildings this always begins with "LB", for example "LB12345".)	Image
Ewes Parish Church And Churchyard				55°12′28″N 2°59′34″W	Category B	9730	Upload Photo
Ewes Parish Manse Including Outbuilding				55°12′25″N 2°59′38″W	Category C(S)	9731	Upload Photo
Tarras Bridge At Tarras Lodge				55°10′27″N 2°56′19″W	Category C(S)	9774	Upload Photo
Arkleton House, Walled Garden, Glass Houses And Gardener's Cottage				55°12′52″N 2°58′41″W	Category B	9728	Upload Photo
Hoghill Farmhouse And Steading				55°11′37″N 2°59′13″W	Category B	9771	Upload Photo
Henry Scott Riddell Memorial				55°12′01″N 2°59′39″W	Category B	9773	Upload Photo
Eweslees Old Farmhouse				55°16′01″N 2°57′53″W	Category C(S)	9732	Upload Photo
Arkleton House, Former Stables				55°12′48″N 2°58′30″W	Category C(S)	9729	Upload Photo
Arkleton House				55°12′49″N 2°58′33″W	Category B	9727	Upload Photo
Meikledale Barn				55°13′37″N 2°59′01″W	Category C(S)	8128	Upload Photo
Burnfoot Farmhouse				55°15′28″N 2°57′37″W	Category C(S)	8126	Upload Photo
Glendivan Farmhouse				55°12′28″N 2°59′19″W	Category C(S)	8127	Upload Photo
Fiddleton Bar Tollhouse				55°15′22″N 2°57′49″W	Category B	9770	Upload Photo
Meikledale Farmhouse				55°13′38″N 2°59′00″W	Category B	9772	Upload Photo

== Key ==
The scheme for classifying buildings in Scotland is:

- Category A: "buildings of national or international importance, either architectural or historic; or fine, little-altered examples of some particular period, style or building type."
- Category B: "buildings of regional or more than local importance; or major examples of some particular period, style or building type, which may have been altered."
- Category C: "buildings of local importance; lesser examples of any period, style, or building type, as originally constructed or moderately altered; and simple traditional buildings which group well with other listed buildings."

In March 2016 there were 47,288 listed buildings in Scotland. Of these, 8% were Category A, and 50% were Category B, with the remaining 42% being Category C.
