= List of listed buildings in Kirkmahoe, Dumfries and Galloway =

This is a list of listed buildings in the parish of Kirkmahoe in Dumfries and Galloway, Scotland.

== List ==
Name	Location	Date Listed	Grid Ref. (Note: Sometimes known as OSGB36, the grid reference (where provided) is based on the British national grid reference system used by the Ordnance Survey. • "Guide to National Grid". Ordnance Survey. • "Get-a-map". Ordnance Survey.)	Geo-coordinates	Notes	LB Number (Note: Historic Environment Scotland assign a unique alphanumeric identifier to each designated site in Scotland, for listed buildings this always begins with "LB", for example "LB12345".)	Image
Dalswinton Village 1-13 Main Street (Houses On South Side Of Road) (Odd Numbers)				55°09′04″N 3°40′09″W	Category B	10229	Upload Photo
Duncow North Lodge And Gatepiers				55°08′06″N 3°37′02″W	Category B	10234	Upload Photo
Kemys Hall And Outbuildings				55°07′27″N 3°36′47″W	Category B	10258	Upload Photo
Kirkton Village Rowan Cottage				55°06′59″N 3°36′29″W	Category C(S)	10262	Upload Photo
Kirkton Village Greystone Cottage				55°06′59″N 3°36′30″W	Category C(S)	10263	Upload Photo
Kirkton Village 1-5 Weighbridge Cottages				55°07′01″N 3°36′27″W	Category B	10265	Upload Photo
Riddingwood Garden House				55°08′11″N 3°35′28″W	Category B	10272	Upload Photo
Carnsalloch House				55°06′23″N 3°36′52″W	Category A	10300	Upload Photo
Carnsalloch Chapel At The Mount				55°06′44″N 3°36′32″W	Category A	10301	Upload Photo
Carnsalloch House Walled Garden And Adjoining Cottage				55°06′21″N 3°36′41″W	Category C(S)	10304	Upload Photo
West Galloberry Farm Steading And Horsemill				55°07′38″N 3°37′34″W	Category A	10218	Upload Photo
Dalswinton Village Former School				55°09′06″N 3°40′14″W	Category C(S)	10232	Upload Photo
Duncow Former Stable And Former Kennels				55°08′08″N 3°37′14″W	Category B	10233	Upload Photo
Isle Tower				55°07′55″N 3°40′14″W	Category B	10236	Upload Photo
Kirkmahoe Parish Manse And Gatepiers				55°07′08″N 3°37′06″W	Category C(S)	10259	Upload Photo
Quarrelwood Former Cameronian Manse And Chapel				55°08′31″N 3°37′57″W	Category B	10273	Upload Photo
Clonfeacles Tower				55°09′24″N 3°38′35″W	Category B	10280	Upload Photo
Dalswinton House Former Stables				55°08′28″N 3°39′40″W	Category B	10288	Upload Photo
Dalswinton Village 2-12 Main Street (Houses On East Side Of Road) (Even Numbers)				55°09′05″N 3°40′13″W	Category B	10230	Upload Photo
Dalswinton Village Former Smithy				55°09′03″N 3°40′09″W	Category B	10231	Upload Photo
Kirkton Village Village Pump				55°06′58″N 3°36′26″W	Category C(S)	10264	Upload Photo
Milnhead House				55°06′47″N 3°36′55″W	Category B	10266	Upload Photo
Dalswinton House Dalswinton Old House				55°08′23″N 3°39′25″W	Category B	10282	Upload Photo
Dalswinton House Dovecot				55°08′37″N 3°39′36″W	Category B	10284	Upload another image
Dalswinton House East Gate Lodges And Gatepiers				55°08′33″N 3°39′04″W	Category B	10287	Upload Photo
Kirkton Village Kirkmahoe Parish Church, Churchyard And Gatepiers				55°07′03″N 3°36′34″W	Category B	10260	Upload Photo
Castlehill Farm Former Windmill				55°08′16″N 3°36′39″W	Category B	10279	Upload Photo
Dalswinton House				55°08′23″N 3°39′33″W	Category B	10281	Upload Photo
Carnsalloch Lodge And Gatepiers				55°06′31″N 3°36′20″W	Category B	10302	Upload Photo
Carnsalloch Former Stables				55°06′26″N 3°36′40″W	Category A	10303	Upload Photo
Wellington Bridge Over The Lake				55°06′52″N 3°36′50″W	Category C(S)	10217	Upload Photo
Newlands Lodge At Sunnybrae				55°08′34″N 3°36′59″W	Category B	10270	Upload Photo
Dalswinton House Walled Garden				55°08′32″N 3°39′26″W	Category B	10285	Upload Photo
Dalswinton House Back Lodge And Gatepiers				55°08′35″N 3°39′14″W	Category C(S)	10286	Upload Photo
Milnhead House Dovecot				55°06′49″N 3°36′55″W	Category B	10267	Upload Photo
Milnhead House Walled Garden				55°06′47″N 3°36′54″W	Category B	10268	Upload Photo
Newlands House				55°08′59″N 3°37′48″W	Category C(S)	10269	Upload Photo
Dalswinton Mill				55°08′59″N 3°39′08″W	Category B	10228	Upload Photo
Duncow South Lodge And Gatepiers				55°07′38″N 3°37′00″W	Category B	10235	Upload Photo
Kirkton Village Rowan House				55°06′59″N 3°36′29″W	Category C(S)	10261	Upload Photo
Riddingwood House				55°08′18″N 3°35′30″W	Category B	10271	Upload Photo
Dalswinton House Dam At Dalswinton Loch				55°08′28″N 3°39′26″W	Category C(S)	10283	Upload Photo
Dalswinton Barony Chapel				55°08′52″N 3°39′44″W	Category B	10289	Upload Photo

== Key ==
The scheme for classifying buildings in Scotland is:

- Category A: "buildings of national or international importance, either architectural or historic; or fine, little-altered examples of some particular period, style or building type."
- Category B: "buildings of regional or more than local importance; or major examples of some particular period, style or building type, which may have been altered."
- Category C: "buildings of local importance; lesser examples of any period, style, or building type, as originally constructed or moderately altered; and simple traditional buildings which group well with other listed buildings."

In March 2016 there were 47,288 listed buildings in Scotland. Of these, 8% were Category A, and 50% were Category B, with the remaining 42% being Category C.
