= List of listed buildings in Kirkmaiden, Dumfries and Galloway =

This is a list of listed buildings in the civil parish of Kirkmaiden, in Dumfries and Galloway, Scotland.

== List ==
Name	Location	Date Listed	Grid Ref. (Note: Sometimes known as OSGB36, the grid reference (where provided) is based on the British national grid reference system used by the Ordnance Survey. • "Guide to National Grid". Ordnance Survey. • "Get-a-map". Ordnance Survey.)	Geo-coordinates	Notes	LB Number (Note: Historic Environment Scotland assign a unique alphanumeric identifier to each designated site in Scotland, for listed buildings this always begins with "LB", for example "LB12345".)	Image
Terally, Tile Works Cottages				54°43′32″N 4°55′18″W	Category B	13592	Upload Photo
K6 Telephone Kiosk, At Gateway To Mull School				54°39′45″N 4°54′04″W	Category B	13557	Upload Photo
Kirkbride, Farmhouse And Steading				54°43′13″N 4°55′31″W	Category C(S)	13560	Upload Photo
Logan, Logan Botanic Garden				54°44′30″N 4°57′36″W	Category B	13565	Upload another image
Low Currochtrie, Farmhouse				54°41′50″N 4°55′06″W	Category C(S)	13573	Upload Photo
Mull Of Galloway Lighthouse, Lighthouse Keepers' Houses And Boundary Walls				54°38′06″N 4°51′26″W	Category A	13578	Upload another image See more images
Drummore, 5 Shore Street, Ship Inn				54°41′28″N 4°53′36″W	Category C(S)	10101	Upload Photo
East Tarbet, Cottage And Quay				54°38′22″N 4°52′35″W	Category B	10126	Upload Photo
Drummore, 19 Shore Street				54°41′29″N 4°53′40″W	Category B	10131	Upload Photo
Kennedy's Cairn				54°38′08″N 4°52′25″W	Category C(S)	13558	Upload Photo
Logan, Bridge				54°44′08″N 4°57′49″W	Category C(S)	13561	Upload Photo
Low Drummore, Farmhouse				54°41′17″N 4°53′41″W	Category C(S)	13574	Upload Photo
Mull Hill, Beacon				54°44′13″N 4°59′10″W	Category C(S)	13575	Upload Photo
Port Logan, Laigh Row, Port Logan Lodge				54°43′25″N 4°57′22″W	Category C(S)	13585	Upload Photo
Drummore, 17 Mill Street, Ingleston				54°41′22″N 4°53′43″W	Category C(S)	10090	Upload Photo
Drummore, 33 Mill Street				54°41′23″N 4°53′41″W	Category C(S)	10096	Upload Photo
Terally Brick And Tile Works				54°43′35″N 4°55′13″W	Category B	13590	Upload Photo
Longbows (Former Drummore School And Schoolhouse)				54°41′34″N 4°54′19″W	Category C(S)	13571	Upload Photo
Port Logan Lighthouse Tower And Pier				54°43′26″N 4°57′36″W	Category B	13586	Upload Photo
St Agnes's (Former) Church And Manse, With Railings				54°45′08″N 4°56′08″W	Category B	13589	Upload Photo
Drummore, 41 Mill Street				54°41′24″N 4°53′39″W	Category C(S)	10097	Upload Photo
Drummore, 36 And 38 Stair Street, With Railings, Gates And Gatepiers				54°41′31″N 4°53′48″W	Category C(S)	10124	Upload Photo
Terally Brick, Coal Store				54°43′47″N 4°55′00″W	Category C(S)	13591	Upload Photo
Logan Mills, Fishing Store				54°45′12″N 4°55′43″W	Category C(S)	13568	Upload Photo
Port Logan, Laigh Row (Mr Davey)				54°43′24″N 4°57′24″W	Category C(S)	13584	Upload Photo
Drummore, 57 Mill Street, Warehouse				54°41′28″N 4°53′34″W	Category C(S)	10098	Upload Photo
Drummore, 13 Shore Street, Norwood				54°41′29″N 4°53′39″W	Category B	10103	Upload Photo
Drummore, 15 Shore Street, Anwoth				54°41′29″N 4°53′39″W	Category B	10129	Upload Photo
Logan, Hen Knowe Cottages				54°44′46″N 4°57′43″W	Category C(S)	13563	Upload Photo
Logan Mills, Sawmill, With Water-Wheel				54°45′07″N 4°55′46″W	Category B	13569	Upload Photo
Logan Windmill				54°45′13″N 4°55′50″W	Category A	13570	Upload another image See more images
Mullhill, Farmhouse				54°44′18″N 4°58′54″W	Category C(S)	13576	Upload Photo
Mull School And Schoolhouse				54°39′46″N 4°54′05″W	Category C(S)	13579	Upload Photo
Old Parish Church Of Kirkmaiden, With Graveyard, Graveyard Walls And Gatepiers				54°41′32″N 4°54′42″W	Category A	13581	Upload another image
Port Logan, 15 Laigh Row				54°43′23″N 4°57′25″W	Category C(S)	13583	Upload Photo
Balgowan, Farmhouse				54°44′53″N 4°55′58″W	Category B	10086	Upload Photo
Chapel Rossan				54°45′53″N 4°56′27″W	Category B	10088	Upload Photo
Drummore, 29 And 31 Mill Street, Queen's Hotel				54°41′23″N 4°53′41″W	Category B	10092	Upload Photo
Drummore, Saint Medan's Church Boundary Walls, Railings, Gates And War Memorial				54°41′27″N 4°53′44″W	Category B	10100	Upload Photo
Drummore, 40 Stair Street				54°41′31″N 4°53′49″W	Category C(S)	10125	Upload Photo
Logan, Logan Court (Former Coach House And Stables)				54°44′46″N 4°57′34″W	Category B	13566	Upload Photo
Port Logan School				54°43′47″N 4°57′21″W	Category C(S)	13587	Upload Photo
Castle Clanyard				54°41′46″N 4°56′12″W	Category C(S)	10087	Upload Photo
Drummore, Mill Street, Wylie's Mill, With Water-Wheel				54°41′27″N 4°53′33″W	Category C(S)	10089	Upload Photo
Drummore, 17 Shore Street				54°41′29″N 4°53′40″W	Category B	10130	Upload Photo
Drummore, Stair Street, Lamb Monument				54°41′27″N 4°53′43″W	Category C(S)	10132	Upload Photo
Logan, Folly Tower				54°44′39″N 4°57′53″W	Category C(S)	13562	Upload Photo
Low Clanyard, Farmhouse				54°41′46″N 4°56′20″W	Category B	13572	Upload Photo
Old Kirkmaiden House (Former Manse)				54°41′40″N 4°54′58″W	Category B	13580	Upload Photo
Port Logan, 14 Laigh Row				54°43′23″N 4°57′25″W	Category C(S)	13582	Upload Photo
Port Logan Schoolhouse				54°43′49″N 4°57′19″W	Category C(S)	13588	Upload Photo
Drummore, 19 Mill Street				54°41′22″N 4°53′43″W	Category C(S)	10091	Upload Photo
Drummore, 4 Mill Street, Cairnsmore				54°41′20″N 4°53′44″W	Category C(S)	10099	Upload Photo
Killumpha, Farmhouse				54°43′34″N 4°55′57″W	Category B	13559	Upload Photo
Logan House				54°44′39″N 4°57′32″W	Category A	13564	Upload another image
Logan, Logan Fish Pond, Cottage And Bathing Hut				54°43′50″N 4°57′53″W	Category B	13567	Upload Photo
Auchness, Farmhouse And Cottage				54°45′37″N 4°56′38″W	Category B	10085	Upload Photo
Drummore, 11 Shore Street, Tudor House				54°41′29″N 4°53′38″W	Category B	10102	Upload Photo

== Key ==
The scheme for classifying buildings in Scotland is:

- Category A: "buildings of national or international importance, either architectural or historic; or fine, little-altered examples of some particular period, style or building type."
- Category B: "buildings of regional or more than local importance; or major examples of some particular period, style or building type, which may have been altered."
- Category C: "buildings of local importance; lesser examples of any period, style, or building type, as originally constructed or moderately altered; and simple traditional buildings which group well with other listed buildings."

In March 2016 there were 47,288 listed buildings in Scotland. Of these, 8% were Category A, and 50% were Category B, with the remaining 42% being Category C.
