= List of listed buildings in Half Morton, Dumfries and Galloway =

This is a list of listed buildings in the parish of Half Morton in Dumfries and Galloway, Scotland.

== List ==
| Name | Location | Date Listed | Grid Ref. (Note: Sometimes known as OSGB36, the grid reference (where provided) is based on the British national grid reference system used by the Ordnance Survey. • "Guide to National Grid". Ordnance Survey. • "Get-a-map". Ordnance Survey.) | Geo-coordinates | Notes | LB Number (Note: Historic Environment Scotland assign a unique alphanumeric identifier to each designated site in Scotland, for listed buildings this always begins with "LB", for example "LB12345".) | Image |
|---|---|---|---|---|---|---|---|
| Cadgill House (Former Parish Manse) | | | | 55°03′28″N 3°04′08″W | Category B | 10081 | Upload Photo |
| Half Morton Parish Church And Churchyard | | | | 55°03′36″N 3°03′57″W | Category C(S) | 10083 | Upload Photo |
| Corries Mill Bridge (Over River Sark) | | | | 55°02′12″N 3°01′34″W | Category C(S) | 10082 | Upload Photo |
| High Stenries, Including Barn | | | | 55°04′56″N 3°06′48″W | Category C(S) | 10084 | Upload Photo |
| Cadgill Bridge (B6357 Over Cadgill Burn) | | | | 55°03′23″N 3°04′05″W | Category B | 10080 | Upload Photo |

== Key ==
The scheme for classifying buildings in Scotland is:

- Category A: "buildings of national or international importance, either architectural or historic; or fine, little-altered examples of some particular period, style or building type."
- Category B: "buildings of regional or more than local importance; or major examples of some particular period, style or building type, which may have been altered."
- Category C: "buildings of local importance; lesser examples of any period, style, or building type, as originally constructed or moderately altered; and simple traditional buildings which group well with other listed buildings."

In March 2016 there were 47,288 listed buildings in Scotland. Of these, 8% were Category A, and 50% were Category B, with the remaining 42% being Category C.
