= List of listed buildings in St Mungo, Dumfries and Galloway =

This is a list of listed buildings in the civil parish of St Mungo in Dumfries and Galloway, Scotland.

== List ==
Name	Location	Date listed	Geo-coordinates	Notes	Category	LB number	Image
Bankside House And Outbuildings			55°04′06″N 3°20′33″W		B	16887	Upload Photo
Castlemilk			55°05′04″N 3°20′03″W		A	16888	Upload Photo
Castlemilk Bridge (Former Line Of A74 Over Water Of Milk)			55°05′40″N 3°19′42″W		B	16889	Upload Photo
Castlemilk, North Lodge Gatepiers And Railings			55°05′37″N 3°19′37″W		B	16895	Upload Photo
Kettleholm Village, 1-4 Kettleholm Cottages (Inclusive Nos) And Post Office			55°04′46″N 3°20′33″W		B	16904	Upload Photo
Kettlebridge Village, Southview			55°04′45″N 3°20′33″W		C(S)	16906	Upload Photo
Murrayfield House			55°07′02″N 3°19′39″W		C(S)	16908	Upload Photo
Norwood Cottage			55°05′59″N 3°19′46″W		C(S)	16909	Upload Photo
Castlemilk, Driveway Bridge			55°04′57″N 3°19′56″W		A	16890	Upload Photo
Castlemilk Home Farm House And Steading And Gatepiers (Howcleuch)			55°04′30″N 3°19′56″W		C(S)	16892	Upload Photo
Kettleholm Bridge			55°04′42″N 3°20′32″W		B	16903	Upload Photo
Kettleholm Village, Kettleholm Village Hall			55°04′45″N 3°20′31″W		C(S)	16905	Upload Photo
Kettleholm Village The Old Hall			55°04′45″N 3°20′33″W		C(S)	16907	Upload Photo
St Mungo Parish Church (Church Of Scotland)			55°04′50″N 3°20′36″W		B	16885	Upload Photo
St Mungo School (Near Kettleholm)			55°04′57″N 3°20′40″W		C(S)	16886	Upload Photo
Castlemilk, Fountain (To North Of House)			55°05′06″N 3°20′01″W		B	16891	Upload Photo
Castlemilk, Kennels And Kennels Cottage			55°05′07″N 3°19′25″W		B	16893	Upload Photo
Castlemilk Sundial (To North Of House)			55°05′06″N 3°20′02″W		B	16899	Upload Photo
Castlemilk, Walled Garden			55°05′27″N 3°19′47″W		B	16900	Upload Photo
Castlemilk, Stables			55°05′04″N 3°19′44″W		B	16898	Upload Photo
Highlaw Farmhouse And Steading			55°05′47″N 3°21′05″W		B	16902	Upload Photo
Castlemilk Smithy, Smithy Lodge And Gatepiers (Castlemilk Gates)			55°05′10″N 3°19′10″W		B	16896	Upload Photo
Castlemilk Mill, Farmhouse			55°05′42″N 3°19′46″W		C(S)	16901	Upload Photo
Castlemilk, Laundry			55°05′35″N 3°19′46″W		B	16894	Upload Photo
Castlemilk, South Lodge Gatepiers And Railings			55°04′38″N 3°20′29″W		B	16897	Upload Photo

== Key ==
The scheme for classifying buildings in Scotland is:

- Category A: "buildings of national or international importance, either architectural or historic; or fine, little-altered examples of some particular period, style or building type."
- Category B: "buildings of regional or more than local importance; or major examples of some particular period, style or building type, which may have been altered."
- Category C: "buildings of local importance; lesser examples of any period, style, or building type, as originally constructed or moderately altered; and simple traditional buildings which group well with other listed buildings."

In March 2016 there were 47,288 listed buildings in Scotland. Of these, 8% were Category A, and 50% were Category B, with the remaining 42% being Category C.
