= List of listed buildings in Tinwald, Dumfries and Galloway =

This is a list of listed buildings in the civil parish of Tinwald in Dumfries and Galloway, Scotland.

== List ==
Name	Location	Date Listed	Grid Ref. (Note: Sometimes known as OSGB36, the grid reference (where provided) is based on the British national grid reference system used by the Ordnance Survey. • "Guide to National Grid". Ordnance Survey. • "Get-a-map". Ordnance Survey.)	Geo-coordinates	Notes	LB Number (Note: Historic Environment Scotland assign a unique alphanumeric identifier to each designated site in Scotland, for listed buildings this always begins with "LB", for example "LB12345".)	Image
Ae Bridge (A701 Over Water Of Ae)				55°09′56″N 3°33′15″W	Category B	17231	Upload Photo
Tinwaldshaws Farmhouse				55°06′47″N 3°32′44″W	Category B	17244	Upload Photo
Amisfield House Former Stables				55°08′17″N 3°35′04″W	Category B	17236	Upload Photo
Tinwald Parish Church, And Churchyard				55°07′09″N 3°33′56″W	Category B	17241	Upload Photo
Amisfield House				55°08′17″N 3°34′58″W	Category B	17232	Upload Photo
Amisfield Lodge & Gatepiers				55°08′06″N 3°34′51″W	Category C(S)	17235	Upload Photo
Tinwald House Cottages				55°06′24″N 3°32′30″W	Category A	17239	Upload Photo
Glenae House And Gatepiers				55°08′40″N 3°35′13″W	Category B	17237	Upload Photo
Tinwald House				55°06′26″N 3°32′31″W	Category A	17238	Upload another image
Amisfield Garden Walls				55°08′19″N 3°34′56″W	Category B	17234	Upload Photo
Amisfield Tower				55°08′18″N 3°34′58″W	Category A	17233	Upload Photo
Tinwald House Farm Steading (Original 2-Storey L-Plan Block Only)				55°06′27″N 3°32′34″W	Category A	17240	Upload Photo
Tinwald Old Manse And Flanking Wings				55°07′06″N 3°34′11″W	Category C(S)	17243	Upload Photo
Trailflat Churchyard				55°08′30″N 3°29′42″W	Category C(S)	17205	Upload Photo
Tinwald Parish Manse				55°07′03″N 3°34′13″W	Category B	17242	Upload Photo

== Key ==
The scheme for classifying buildings in Scotland is:

- Category A: "buildings of national or international importance, either architectural or historic; or fine, little-altered examples of some particular period, style or building type."
- Category B: "buildings of regional or more than local importance; or major examples of some particular period, style or building type, which may have been altered."
- Category C: "buildings of local importance; lesser examples of any period, style, or building type, as originally constructed or moderately altered; and simple traditional buildings which group well with other listed buildings."

In March 2016 there were 47,288 listed buildings in Scotland. Of these, 8% were Category A, and 50% were Category B, with the remaining 42% being Category C.
