= List of listed buildings in Gretna, Dumfries and Galloway =

This is a list of listed buildings in the parish of Gretna in Dumfries and Galloway, Scotland.

== List ==
Name	Location	Date Listed	Grid Ref. (Note: Sometimes known as OSGB36, the grid reference (where provided) is based on the British national grid reference system used by the Ordnance Survey. • "Guide to National Grid". Ordnance Survey. • "Get-a-map". Ordnance Survey.)	Geo-coordinates	Notes	LB Number (Note: Historic Environment Scotland assign a unique alphanumeric identifier to each designated site in Scotland, for listed buildings this always begins with "LB", for example "LB12345".)	Image
Gretna Village, 148-171 Central Avenue (Inclusive Nos)				54°59′46″N 3°04′01″W	Category B	9961	Upload Photo
Plump Bridge (A6071 Over River Sark)				55°00′08″N 3°02′47″W	Category B	9927	Upload Photo
Rigg Village 1 And 2 Meikle Green				54°59′31″N 3°06′27″W	Category C(S)	9928	Upload Photo
Gretna Village, Annan Road, Surrone House				54°59′45″N 3°03′48″W	Category C(S)	9935	Upload Photo
30-52 (Even Nos) Victory Avenue				54°59′47″N 3°04′08″W	Category C(S)	9940	Upload Photo
54-68 (Even Nos) Victory Avenue				54°59′47″N 3°04′06″W	Category B	9941	Upload Photo
Gretna Village, 14-32 (Even Nos) Canberra Road				54°59′49″N 3°03′44″W	Category B	9926	Upload Photo
Gretna Village, 56A-F, 58A-C And 60A-E Annan Road, (Including Tourist Information Office)				54°59′43″N 3°03′57″W	Category B	9937	Upload Photo
Gretna Village, 23-33 (Odd Nos) Canberra Road				54°59′49″N 3°03′48″W	Category B	9938	Upload Photo
Gretna Village 2-12 (Even Nos) Canberra Road				54°59′46″N 3°03′44″W	Category B	9939	Upload Photo
Rigg Village, The Square, House With Shop And Houses Adjoining, The Cottage And Five Bells				54°59′30″N 3°06′31″W	Category C(S)	9945	Upload Photo
Kirtleside Bridge (A75 Over Kirlte Water)				54°59′35″N 3°06′17″W	Category B	9942	Upload Photo
Gretna Green, Gretna Hall Former Stables, Including Elmwood				55°00′15″N 3°04′00″W	Category B	9958	Upload Photo
Gretna Green, Gretna Parish Church And Churchyard				55°00′07″N 3°03′57″W	Category B	9959	Upload Photo
Gretna Village, Canwath Road, St Andrews Church (Church Of Scotland)				54°59′34″N 3°04′04″W	Category B	9960	Upload Photo
Gretna Village, Victory Road, R C Church				54°59′49″N 3°04′06″W	Category B	9963	Upload Photo
Gretna Village, 83-105 (Odd Nos) And 86-96 (Even Nos) Victory Avenue				54°59′51″N 3°03′53″W	Category B	9964	Upload Photo
Gretna Green, Gretna Hall Hotel And Gatepiers				55°00′14″N 3°03′57″W	Category B	9931	Upload Photo
Gretna Village, Annan Road, The Gables				54°59′46″N 3°04′22″W	Category B	9932	Upload Photo
Sark Bridge (A75, South Bound Traffic Over River Sark)				54°59′35″N 3°03′11″W	Category B	9946	Upload Photo
Gretna Village, School				54°59′47″N 3°03′54″W	Category B	9962	Upload Photo
Douglas Farmhouse				55°00′37″N 3°05′04″W	Category C(S)	9930	Upload Photo
Gretna Village, Annan Road, Rectory To All Saints Episcopal Church				54°59′44″N 3°04′06″W	Category B	9933	Upload Photo
Gretna Village, Annan Road, Hunters Lodge Hotel				54°59′44″N 3°03′49″W	Category B	9936	Upload Photo
Gretna Village, 121 Central Avenue, Former Gretna Cinema				54°59′40″N 3°04′03″W	Category C(S)	51732	Upload Photo
Springfield Village, Old Blacksmith's Shop And Smithy				55°00′19″N 3°03′46″W	Category B	9929	Upload Photo
Gretna Village, Annan Road, All Saints Episcopal Church				54°59′44″N 3°04′03″W	Category B	9934	Upload Photo
Old Toll House ("Scotland's First House")				54°59′37″N 3°03′13″W	Category B	9943	Upload Photo

== Key ==
The scheme for classifying buildings in Scotland is:

- Category A: "buildings of national or international importance, either architectural or historic; or fine, little-altered examples of some particular period, style or building type."
- Category B: "buildings of regional or more than local importance; or major examples of some particular period, style or building type, which may have been altered."
- Category C: "buildings of local importance; lesser examples of any period, style, or building type, as originally constructed or moderately altered; and simple traditional buildings which group well with other listed buildings."

In March 2016 there were 47,288 listed buildings in Scotland. Of these, 8% were Category A, and 50% were Category B, with the remaining 42% being Category C.
