= List of listed buildings in Tundergarth, Dumfries and Galloway =

This is a list of listed buildings in the civil parish of Tundergarth in Dumfries and Galloway, Scotland.

== List ==
Name	Location	Date Listed	Grid Ref. (Note: Sometimes known as OSGB36, the grid reference (where provided) is based on the British national grid reference system used by the Ordnance Survey. • "Guide to National Grid". Ordnance Survey. • "Get-a-map". Ordnance Survey.)	Geo-coordinates	Notes	LB Number (Note: Historic Environment Scotland assign a unique alphanumeric identifier to each designated site in Scotland, for listed buildings this always begins with "LB", for example "LB12345".)	Image
Burnhead Farmhouse				55°07′08″N 3°16′03″W	Category B	16911	Upload Photo
Milton House				55°08′45″N 3°12′16″W	Category B	16913	Upload Photo
Tundergarth Cottage				55°06′52″N 3°17′45″W	Category C(S)	16914	Upload Photo
Tundergarth Parish Church, Churchyard Walls And Gatepiers And Shell Of Former Parish Church (Church Of Scotland)				55°06′53″N 3°17′42″W	Category B	16916	Upload Photo
Castlehill Farmhouse				55°07′13″N 3°17′04″W	Category C(S)	16912	Upload Photo
Standburn, Hay Barn				55°07′49″N 3°14′18″W	Category B	16917	Upload Photo
Tundergarth Mains Farmhouse				55°06′48″N 3°17′33″W	Category C(S)	16915	Upload Photo

== Key ==
The scheme for classifying buildings in Scotland is:

- Category A: "buildings of national or international importance, either architectural or historic; or fine, little-altered examples of some particular period, style or building type."
- Category B: "buildings of regional or more than local importance; or major examples of some particular period, style or building type, which may have been altered."
- Category C: "buildings of local importance; lesser examples of any period, style, or building type, as originally constructed or moderately altered; and simple traditional buildings which group well with other listed buildings."

In March 2016 there were 47,288 listed buildings in Scotland. Of these, 8% were Category A, and 50% were Category B, with the remaining 42% being Category C.
