= List of listed buildings in Kirkmabreck, Dumfries and Galloway =

This is a list of listed buildings in the parish of Kirkmabreck, in Dumfries and Galloway, Scotland.

== List ==
Name	Location	Date Listed	Grid Ref. (Note: Sometimes known as OSGB36, the grid reference (where provided) is based on the British national grid reference system used by the Ordnance Survey. • "Guide to National Grid". Ordnance Survey. • "Get-a-map". Ordnance Survey.)	Geo-coordinates	Notes	LB Number (Note: Historic Environment Scotland assign a unique alphanumeric identifier to each designated site in Scotland, for listed buildings this always begins with "LB", for example "LB12345".)	Image
Creetown, 63-65 And 67-69 St John Street				54°54′00″N 4°22′45″W	Category C(S)	13129	Upload Photo
Creetown, 26 St John Street				54°54′02″N 4°22′46″W	Category C(S)	13132	Upload Photo
Kirkdale Bridge				54°51′02″N 4°18′40″W	Category A	13137	Upload another image See more images
Kirkdale House And Sundial				54°51′08″N 4°18′54″W	Category A	13138	Upload another image
Barholm Farm				54°51′00″N 4°18′22″W	Category B	10094	Upload Photo
Creetown, High Street North, Kilbucho				54°54′04″N 4°22′35″W	Category B	10147	Upload Photo
Creetown, Hill Of Burns, Gatepiers And Stable Courtyard				54°53′58″N 4°22′35″W	Category B	10149	Upload Photo
Creetown, Kirk Brae, Kirkmabreck Parish Church And Graveyard				54°53′52″N 4°22′41″W	Category B	10151	Upload another image See more images
Kirkdale Mausoleum And Kirkdale Kirk And Graveyard Walls				54°51′33″N 4°19′10″W	Category A	13139	Upload another image
Kirkdale Steadings And Slaughterhouse				54°51′18″N 4°19′05″W	Category A	13140	Upload Photo
Cassencaire House With Gatepiers And Walled Garden				54°53′25″N 4°22′39″W	Category B	10106	Upload Photo
Creetown, 3 St John Street With Railings				54°54′07″N 4°22′44″W	Category C(S)	10153	Upload Photo
Glen Farmhouse, With Stable Block				54°53′42″N 4°16′02″W	Category B	13136	Upload Photo
Kirkmabreck Kirk				54°52′50″N 4°21′05″W	Category B	13142	Upload another image See more images
Creetown, Barholm Street, Bayview With Boundary Wall, Gate And Railings				54°54′07″N 4°22′48″W	Category B	10145	Upload Photo
Creetown,13 St John Street				54°54′06″N 4°22′44″W	Category C(S)	13124	Upload Photo
Creetown, Station Yard, Station				54°54′39″N 4°22′45″W	Category B	13134	Upload Photo
Barholm Castle				54°50′58″N 4°18′20″W	Category A	10093	Upload another image
Creetown, 2, 4 St John Street, Ellangowan Hotel				54°54′04″N 4°22′46″W	Category B	13131	Upload Photo
Creetown, South Barholm Lodge				54°54′07″N 4°22′54″W	Category B	13133	Upload Photo
Carsluith Castle And Adjoining Steadings				54°51′34″N 4°20′48″W	Category A	10104	Upload another image See more images
Creetown, Barholm Mains, Wickham Place (Former Stables)				54°54′18″N 4°23′12″W	Category B	10108	Upload Photo
Creetown, 15 St John Street				54°54′06″N 4°22′44″W	Category B	13125	Upload Photo
Creetown, 19 St John Street				54°54′05″N 4°22′44″W	Category C(S)	13127	Upload Photo
Carsluith, Corn Mill And Round-Ended Barn				54°51′56″N 4°21′12″W	Category B	10105	Upload Photo
Creetown, Crispin Street, St Crispins				54°53′56″N 4°22′42″W	Category B	10146	Upload Photo
Creetown, Hill Of Burns Hotel And Sundial				54°53′59″N 4°22′40″W	Category B	10148	Upload Photo
Glebe House				54°52′49″N 4°22′26″W	Category B	13135	Upload Photo
Creetown, Hill Street, St Josephs Roman Catholic Church				54°54′05″N 4°22′40″W	Category B	10150	Upload Photo
Creetown Moneypool Bridge				54°54′11″N 4°22′47″W	Category C(S)	10152	Upload Photo
Creetown ,5 St John Street				54°54′07″N 4°22′44″W	Category C(S)	10154	Upload Photo
Creetown, 7-9 St John Street				54°54′07″N 4°22′44″W	Category C(S)	10155	Upload Photo
Creetown, 17 St John Street				54°54′05″N 4°22′44″W	Category B	13126	Upload Photo
Creetown,59-61 St John Street, Cherry Trees And Stables				54°54′00″N 4°22′44″W	Category C(S)	13128	Upload Photo
Creetown, 75 St John Street				54°53′59″N 4°22′45″W	Category C(S)	13130	Upload Photo
Kirkdale Ice House				54°50′59″N 4°18′44″W	Category C(S)	13141	Upload Photo
Carsluith, Bridge Cottage				54°51′53″N 4°21′20″W	Category C(S)	10095	Upload Photo
Creetown, Adamson Square, Clocktower				54°54′05″N 4°22′45″W	Category C(S)	10107	Upload Photo
11 Creetown, St John Street				54°54′06″N 4°22′44″W	Category B	10156	Upload Photo

== Key ==
The scheme for classifying buildings in Scotland is:

- Category A: "buildings of national or international importance, either architectural or historic; or fine, little-altered examples of some particular period, style or building type."
- Category B: "buildings of regional or more than local importance; or major examples of some particular period, style or building type, which may have been altered."
- Category C: "buildings of local importance; lesser examples of any period, style, or building type, as originally constructed or moderately altered; and simple traditional buildings which group well with other listed buildings."

In March 2016 there were 47,288 listed buildings in Scotland. Of these, 8% were Category A, and 50% were Category B, with the remaining 42% being Category C.
