= List of listed buildings in Gatehouse Of Fleet, Dumfries and Galloway =

This is a list of listed buildings in the parish of Gatehouse of Fleet in Dumfries and Galloway, Scotland.

== List ==
Name	Location	Date Listed	Grid Ref. (Note: Sometimes known as OSGB36, the grid reference (where provided) is based on the British national grid reference system used by the Ordnance Survey. • "Guide to National Grid". Ordnance Survey. • "Get-a-map". Ordnance Survey.)	Geo-coordinates	Notes	LB Number (Note: Historic Environment Scotland assign a unique alphanumeric identifier to each designated site in Scotland, for listed buildings this always begins with "LB", for example "LB12345".)	Image
1 Ann Street				54°52′59″N 4°10′53″W	Category C(S)	32021	Upload Photo
Ann Street. Roseville, Railings And Outbuildings				54°52′58″N 4°10′48″W	Category B	32029	Upload Photo
3-23 Birtwhistle Street				54°53′05″N 4°11′01″W	Category B	32033	Upload Photo
5 Boat Green				54°52′48″N 4°11′12″W	Category C(S)	32035	Upload Photo
29 Fleet Street				54°52′50″N 4°11′19″W	Category B	32051	Upload Photo
6-8 (Even Nos) Fleet Street				54°52′50″N 4°11′15″W	Category B	32056	Upload Photo
16 Fleet Street				54°52′49″N 4°11′16″W	Category B	32059	Upload Photo
28-30 (Even Nos) Fleet Street				54°52′49″N 4°11′18″W	Category B	32064	Upload Photo
49-51 (Odd Nos) High Street				54°52′56″N 4°11′01″W	Category C(S)	32075	Upload Photo
53-55 (Odd Nos) High Street				54°52′56″N 4°11′01″W	Category C(S)	32076	Upload Photo
High Street, Bruachmor Brewery And Brewery Brae				54°52′54″N 4°11′05″W	Category B	32095	Upload Photo
5 Ann Street				54°52′58″N 4°10′52″W	Category C(S)	32022	Upload Photo
11 Ann Street, Cally Estate Office				54°52′57″N 4°10′51″W	Category B	32025	Upload Photo
Ann Street, Cox`S Lodge With Boundary Walls And Gatepiers				54°52′56″N 4°10′46″W	Category B	32026	Upload Photo
Ann Street, The Murray Arms And The Gatehouse				54°52′59″N 4°10′51″W	Category B	32027	Upload Photo
Ann Street, Neilson Square				54°52′58″N 4°10′47″W	Category B	32030	Upload Photo
Barlay Mill				54°53′28″N 4°10′56″W	Category C(S)	32032	Upload Photo
6-8 (Even Nos) Bridge Terrace				54°52′50″N 4°11′13″W	Category B	32040	Upload Photo
24-26 (Even Nos) Fleet Street				54°52′49″N 4°11′18″W	Category B	32063	Upload Photo
21 High Street				54°52′58″N 4°10′57″W	Category B	32072	Upload Photo
27-29 (Odd Nos) High Street				54°52′58″N 4°10′58″W	Category C(S)	32073	Upload Photo
57 High Street				54°52′56″N 4°11′02″W	Category B	32077	Upload Photo
2-4 (Even Nos) High Street				54°52′59″N 4°10′54″W	Category C(S)	32078	Upload Photo
12-14 (Even Nos) High Street				54°52′58″N 4°10′55″W	Category C(S)	32081	Upload Photo
58-60 (Even Nos) High Street				54°52′55″N 4°11′01″W	Category C(S)	32090	Upload Photo
62 High Street				54°52′55″N 4°11′02″W	Category B	32091	Upload Photo
70 High Street, The Angel Hotel				54°52′54″N 4°11′03″W	Category B	32093	Upload Photo
Ann Street, The Masonic Arms				54°52′59″N 4°10′50″W	Category B	32028	Upload Photo
3 Boat Green				54°52′48″N 4°11′12″W	Category B	32034	Upload Photo
4 Bridge Terrace				54°52′51″N 4°11′13″W	Category B	32039	Upload Photo
Cally Main Gate Lodges, Gates And Gatepiers				54°52′54″N 4°10′30″W	Category B	32041	Upload another image
25 Fleet Street				54°52′50″N 4°11′18″W	Category B	32049	Upload Photo
27 Fleet Street				54°52′50″N 4°11′18″W	Category B	32050	Upload Photo
39-41 (Odd Nos) Fleet Street				54°52′48″N 4°11′21″W	Category B	32054	Upload Photo
34-36 (Even Nos) High Street				54°52′57″N 4°10′57″W	Category B	32085	Upload Photo
50-52 (Even Nos) High Street				54°52′56″N 4°11′00″W	Category C(S)	32088	Upload Photo
High Street, Horatio Square				54°53′00″N 4°10′54″W	Category B	32097	Upload Photo
7 Ann Street				54°52′58″N 4°10′52″W	Category C(S)	32023	Upload Photo
9 Ann Street				54°52′58″N 4°10′51″W	Category C(S)	32024	Upload Photo
Ann Street, Mill House, (Former Scott`s Cotton Mill)				54°52′57″N 4°10′44″W	Category B	32031	Upload Photo
7 Boat Green				54°52′47″N 4°11′12″W	Category C(S)	32036	Upload Photo
The Bobbin Mill				54°52′57″N 4°11′07″W	Category B	32037	Upload another image
Fleet Street, The Anwoth Hotel				54°52′51″N 4°11′15″W	Category C(S)	32047	Upload Photo
10-12 (Even Nos) Fleet Street				54°52′50″N 4°11′15″W	Category B	32057	Upload Photo
14 Fleet Street				54°52′50″N 4°11′16″W	Category B	32058	Upload Photo
3 Hannay Street				54°52′50″N 4°11′14″W	Category C(S)	32066	Upload Photo
11-15 (Odd Nos) High Street)				54°52′59″N 4°10′56″W	Category B	32070	Upload Photo
64-66 (Even Nos) High Street				54°52′55″N 4°11′02″W	Category C(S)	32092	Upload Photo
High Street, Brae Cottage				54°52′54″N 4°11′05″W	Category B	32096	Upload Photo
St Mary`S Episcopal Church With Railings				54°52′52″N 4°11′14″W	Category C(S)	32099	Upload Photo
Cardonness Castle Cottage				54°52′23″N 4°11′50″W	Category C(S)	32043	Upload Photo
15 And 15A Fleet Street				54°52′50″N 4°11′16″W	Category C(S)	32048	Upload Photo
6 High Street				54°52′59″N 4°10′54″W	Category C(S)	32079	Upload Photo
18-20 (Even Nos) High Street				54°52′58″N 4°10′56″W	Category B	32082	Upload Photo
32 High Street				54°52′57″N 4°10′57″W	Category C(S)	32084	Upload Photo
38-40 (Even Nos) High Street				54°52′57″N 4°10′58″W	Category B	32086	Upload Photo
46-48 (Even Nos) High Street				54°52′56″N 4°10′59″W	Category B	32087	Upload Photo
Church Street, Girthon Parish Church (C Of S) With Lamp Standards, Gatepiers, Gates And Retaining Walls				54°53′02″N 4°10′53″W	Category B	32044	Upload another image
3 And 5 Digby Street				54°52′58″N 4°10′59″W	Category B	32045	Upload Photo
2-4 Fleet Street				54°52′50″N 4°11′14″W	Category B	32055	Upload Photo
18 Fleet Street				54°52′49″N 4°11′17″W	Category B	32060	Upload Photo
32 Fleet Street, Portville With Gates And Boundary Walls				54°52′48″N 4°11′18″W	Category B	32065	Upload Photo
3-5 (Odd Nos) High Street				54°52′59″N 4°10′55″W	Category B	32068	Upload Photo
7-9 (Odd Nos) High Street				54°52′59″N 4°10′56″W	Category C(S)	32069	Upload Photo
47 High Street, Bank Of Fleet Hotel				54°52′57″N 4°11′00″W	Category B	32074	Upload Photo
Woodside Terrace, Toll House				54°53′03″N 4°10′49″W	Category B	32100	Upload Photo
2 Bridge Terrace				54°52′51″N 4°11′12″W	Category B	32038	Upload Photo
Cardonness Castle				54°52′20″N 4°11′53″W	Category A	32042	Upload another image
Fleet Bridge				54°52′52″N 4°11′11″W	Category C(S)	32046	Upload Photo
33 Fleet Street				54°52′49″N 4°11′20″W	Category B	32052	Upload Photo
20 Fleet Street				54°52′49″N 4°11′17″W	Category C(S)	32061	Upload Photo
22 Fleet Street				54°52′49″N 4°11′17″W	Category B	32062	Upload Photo
8-10 (Even Nos) High Street				54°52′59″N 4°10′55″W	Category B	32080	Upload Photo
24-28 (Even Nos) High Street				54°52′58″N 4°10′57″W	Category C(S)	32083	Upload Photo
56 High Street				54°52′55″N 4°11′01″W	Category B	32089	Upload Photo
Little Boreland				54°52′34″N 4°11′48″W	Category B	32098	Upload Photo
35 Fleet Street				54°52′49″N 4°11′20″W	Category C(S)	32053	Upload Photo
High Street And Ann Street, Clocktower				54°53′00″N 4°10′53″W	Category B	32067	Upload another image
15-17 (Odd Nos) High Street				54°52′59″N 4°10′56″W	Category B	32071	Upload Photo
High Street, Rutherford Hall				54°52′53″N 4°11′10″W	Category B	32094	Upload Photo

== Key ==
The scheme for classifying buildings in Scotland is:

- Category A: "buildings of national or international importance, either architectural or historic; or fine, little-altered examples of some particular period, style or building type."
- Category B: "buildings of regional or more than local importance; or major examples of some particular period, style or building type, which may have been altered."
- Category C: "buildings of local importance; lesser examples of any period, style, or building type, as originally constructed or moderately altered; and simple traditional buildings which group well with other listed buildings."

In March 2016 there were 47,288 listed buildings in Scotland. Of these, 8% were Category A, and 50% were Category B, with the remaining 42% being Category C.
