= List of listed buildings in Girthon, Dumfries and Galloway =

This is a list of listed buildings in the civil parish of Girthon, Dumfries and Galloway, Scotland.

== List ==
| Name | Location | Date Listed | Grid Ref. (Note: Sometimes known as OSGB36, the grid reference (where provided) is based on the British national grid reference system used by the Ordnance Survey. • "Guide to National Grid". Ordnance Survey. • "Get-a-map". Ordnance Survey.) | Geo-coordinates | Notes | LB Number (Note: Historic Environment Scotland assign a unique alphanumeric identifier to each designated site in Scotland, for listed buildings this always begins with "LB", for example "LB12345".) | Image |
|---|---|---|---|---|---|---|---|
| Clauchan Cottage Girthon | | | | 54°51′26″N 4°10′25″W | Category C(S) | 9861 | Upload Photo |
| The Temple, (Cally Estate) | | | | 54°51′50″N 4°10′26″W | Category B | 9851 | Upload Photo |
| Disdow And Outbuildings | | | | 54°53′08″N 4°09′36″W | Category C(S) | 9856 | Upload Photo |
| Enrick Farmhouse | | | | 54°52′01″N 4°09′32″W | Category B | 9857 | Upload Photo |
| High Lodge, (Cally Estate) | | | | 54°52′18″N 4°09′34″W | Category B | 9860 | Upload Photo |
| Belvedere Lodge (Cally Estate) | | | | 54°52′07″N 4°10′41″W | Category B | 9865 | Upload Photo |
| Girthon Old Kirk And Churchyard | | | | 54°51′21″N 4°10′26″W | Category A | 9859 | Upload another image |
| Cally Mains Hay Barn | | | | 54°51′47″N 4°11′45″W | Category B | 9853 | Upload Photo |
| Dalmalin Lodge | | | | 54°53′58″N 4°11′11″W | Category C(S) | 9863 | Upload Photo |
| Cally Palace Hotel, Formerly Cally House | | | | 54°52′11″N 4°11′00″W | Category A | 9854 | Upload Photo |
| Furgusson Tombstone | | | | 55°00′45″N 4°11′08″W | Category C(S) | 9858 | Upload Photo |
| Kirk House (Former Manse) | | | | 54°51′22″N 4°10′26″W | Category B | 9862 | Upload Photo |
| Cally Mains Farm Steading | | | | 54°51′49″N 4°11′43″W | Category B | 9866 | Upload Photo |
| Cross Cottage, (Cally Estate) | | | | 54°52′29″N 4°10′41″W | Category B | 9855 | Upload Photo |
| Walled Garden, (Calley Estate) | | | | 54°52′12″N 4°10′35″W | Category B | 43278 | Upload Photo |
| Auchencloy Monument | | | | 55°00′46″N 4°11′06″W | Category C(S) | 9864 | Upload Photo |
| Cally Mains Farmhouse | | | | 54°51′46″N 4°11′50″W | Category B | 9852 | Upload Photo |

== Key ==
The scheme for classifying buildings in Scotland is:

- Category A: "buildings of national or international importance, either architectural or historic; or fine, little-altered examples of some particular period, style or building type."
- Category B: "buildings of regional or more than local importance; or major examples of some particular period, style or building type, which may have been altered."
- Category C: "buildings of local importance; lesser examples of any period, style, or building type, as originally constructed or moderately altered; and simple traditional buildings which group well with other listed buildings."

In March 2016 there were 47,288 listed buildings in Scotland. Of these, 8% were Category A, and 50% were Category B, with the remaining 42% being Category C.
