= List of listed buildings in Johnstone, Dumfries and Galloway =

This is a list of listed buildings in the parish of Johnstone in Dumfries and Galloway, Scotland.

== List ==
Name	Location	Date Listed	Grid Ref. (Note: Sometimes known as OSGB36, the grid reference (where provided) is based on the British national grid reference system used by the Ordnance Survey. • "Guide to National Grid". Ordnance Survey. • "Get-a-map". Ordnance Survey.)	Geo-coordinates	Notes	LB Number (Note: Historic Environment Scotland assign a unique alphanumeric identifier to each designated site in Scotland, for listed buildings this always begins with "LB", for example "LB12345".)	Image
Greenbeck Farmhouse And Steading				55°12′04″N 3°27′16″W	Category C(S)	9879	Upload Photo
Raehills, Walled Garden, Gardener's House, Outbuildings And Sheds				55°13′50″N 3°28′06″W	Category B	9883	Upload Photo
Raehills House				55°14′04″N 3°28′26″W	Category A	9898	Upload another image
Raehills, Killing House (Opposite Stables)				55°14′06″N 3°28′29″W	Category C(S)	9902	Upload Photo
Lochwood Mains				55°15′25″N 3°25′07″W	Category C(S)	9873	Upload Photo
Former Johnstone Parish Manse, With Outbuilding And Gatepiers				55°12′26″N 3°25′02″W	Category B	9870	Upload Photo
Heathfield Farmhouse				55°11′29″N 3°26′47″W	Category C(S)	9881	Upload Photo
St Ann's Bridge (A701 Over Kinnel Water)				55°13′32″N 3°27′57″W	Category B	9885	Upload Photo
St Ann's Village, Cottage				55°13′34″N 3°27′48″W	Category B	9886	Upload Photo
Raehills, Drybridge				55°14′08″N 3°28′10″W	Category C(S)	9899	Upload Photo
Pleasure Gate				55°13′00″N 3°28′30″W	Category C(S)	9874	Upload Photo
Hartfield Tower				55°13′00″N 3°27′57″W	Category C(S)	9880	Upload Photo
Johnstone Parish Church And Churchyard				55°12′29″N 3°24′56″W	Category B	9869	Upload Photo
Lake Bridge (Minor Road Over Archwood Lake)				55°11′02″N 3°25′40″W	Category C(S)	9871	Upload Photo
Raehills, Crunzierton				55°13′42″N 3°28′24″W	Category B	9884	Upload Photo
Raehills, Footbridge At Wallace's Loup (Over Kinnel Water)				55°13′37″N 3°27′56″W	Category B	9900	Upload Photo
Raehills, Gatepiers And Screen Walls				55°13′31″N 3°27′55″W	Category B	9901	Upload Photo
Sawmill Cottage, Near St Ann's Village				55°14′49″N 3°27′57″W	Category B	9887	Upload Photo
The Yett Farmhouse				55°11′53″N 3°26′02″W	Category B	9888	Upload Photo
Raehills, Stables/Garages				55°14′06″N 3°28′27″W	Category B	9903	Upload Photo
Brae Farmhouse				55°11′25″N 3°28′04″W	Category B	9877	Upload Photo
Goodhope Farm House And Steading Including Cart Shed				55°13′07″N 3°27′15″W	Category B	9878	Upload Photo

== Key ==
The scheme for classifying buildings in Scotland is:

- Category A: "buildings of national or international importance, either architectural or historic; or fine, little-altered examples of some particular period, style or building type."
- Category B: "buildings of regional or more than local importance; or major examples of some particular period, style or building type, which may have been altered."
- Category C: "buildings of local importance; lesser examples of any period, style, or building type, as originally constructed or moderately altered; and simple traditional buildings which group well with other listed buildings."

In March 2016 there were 47,288 listed buildings in Scotland. Of these, 8% were Category A, and 50% were Category B, with the remaining 42% being Category C.
