= List of listed buildings in Morton, Dumfries and Galloway =

This is a list of listed buildings in the civil parish of Morton in Dumfries and Galloway, Scotland.

== List ==
Name	Location	Date Listed	Grid Ref. (Note: Sometimes known as OSGB36, the grid reference (where provided) is based on the British national grid reference system used by the Ordnance Survey. • "Guide to National Grid". Ordnance Survey. • "Get-a-map". Ordnance Survey.)	Geo-coordinates	Notes	LB Number (Note: Historic Environment Scotland assign a unique alphanumeric identifier to each designated site in Scotland, for listed buildings this always begins with "LB", for example "LB12345".)	Image
Thornhill Village Townhead Street Dalgarnoc (Former Up Manse) House And Gatepiers				55°14′21″N 3°46′04″W	Category B	17329	Upload Photo
Thornhill Village East Morton Street Primary School				55°14′33″N 3°45′44″W	Category B	17340	Upload Photo
Thornhill Village 1, 1A North Drumlanrig Street				55°14′38″N 3°46′06″W	Category B	17359	Upload Photo
Thornhill Village 86 South Drumlanrig Street				55°14′20″N 3°45′44″W	Category B	17368	Upload Photo
Laught Mains Farmhouse And Barn To South East				55°13′53″N 3°44′12″W	Category B	17380	Upload Photo
Thornhill Village 95A South Drumlanrig Street Bank House				55°14′22″N 3°45′49″W	Category B	17325	Upload Photo
Nithbank House And Gatepiers				55°14′52″N 3°46′39″W	Category C(S)	17335	Upload Photo
Thornhill Village East Morton Street School Caretaker's House				55°14′33″N 3°45′42″W	Category B	17339	Upload Photo
7,8,9 Carronbridge Village				55°15′49″N 3°46′47″W	Category C(S)	17351	Upload Photo
Thornhill, East Morton Street Police Station And House				55°14′33″N 3°45′46″W	Category C(S)	17356	Upload Photo
Thornhill Village 37, 39 North Drumlanrig Street				55°14′30″N 3°45′57″W	Category B	17361	Upload Photo
Thornhill Village 161 North Drumlanrig Street				55°14′37″N 3°46′08″W	Category B	17363	Upload Photo
Thornhill Village 84 South Drumlanrig Street				55°14′20″N 3°45′45″W	Category C(S)	17367	Upload Photo
Dabton House, Stables				55°15′32″N 3°46′23″W	Category B	17372	Upload Photo
Drum Farm House And Steading				55°16′31″N 3°46′19″W	Category B	17374	Upload Photo
Carronhill East Carronhill And West Carronhill				55°15′58″N 3°46′29″W	Category C(S)	17385	Upload Photo
Thornhill Village South Drumlanrig Street George Hotel (South Block Only)				55°14′24″N 3°45′52″W	Category C(S)	17327	Upload Photo
Rowantree House (Formerly Upper Nithsdale Combination Poorhouse)				55°14′54″N 3°43′40″W	Category B	17336	Upload Photo
Broomrigg Cottages				55°16′12″N 3°46′41″W	Category B	17348	Upload Photo
Waterside Mains Farmhouse And Steading Range Adjoining House				55°15′19″N 3°46′47″W	Category B	17355	Upload Photo
Thornhill Village Morton Parish Church				55°14′38″N 3°45′34″W	Category B	17357	Upload Photo
Thornhill Village 66, 67, 68 South Drumlanrig Street Freemason's Hill				55°14′24″N 3°45′49″W	Category B	17366	Upload Photo
8, 9, 10 Gatelawbridge And Old Stable House				55°00′11″N 4°51′31″W	Category B	17376	Upload Photo
Hayfield Farmhouse And Steading				55°15′10″N 3°44′07″W	Category B	17378	Upload Photo
Holmhill House And Courtyard Blocks				55°14′23″N 3°46′34″W	Category B	17379	Upload Photo
Thornhill, Wallace Hall Primary School				55°14′33″N 3°45′40″W	Category C(S)	50174	Upload Photo
Morton Old Church Churchyard Enclosure And Gatepiers				55°15′16″N 3°44′51″W	Category B	17333	Upload Photo
Thornhill Village Morton Parish Manse				55°14′43″N 3°45′33″W	Category B	17358	Upload Photo
Thornhill Village 57, 58 South Drumlanrig Street				55°14′26″N 3°45′52″W	Category B	17364	Upload Photo
Dabton House				55°15′30″N 3°46′25″W	Category B	17370	Upload Photo
Dabton House Walled Garden				55°15′34″N 3°46′19″W	Category B	17373	Upload Photo
Drumcork Farmhouse				55°15′22″N 3°45′36″W	Category C(S)	17375	Upload Photo
Thornhill Village 99-102 South Drumlanrig Street (Numbers Inclusive)				55°14′23″N 3°45′50″W	Category C(S)	17326	Upload Photo
Thornhill Village 63, 64 South Drumlanrig Street				55°14′25″N 3°45′50″W	Category B	17365	Upload Photo
Carronhill Glen Railway Viaduct And Bridge Over Newlands/Drum Road				55°15′57″N 3°46′10″W	Category B	17369	Upload Photo
Dabton House, Lodge And Gatepiers				55°15′25″N 3°46′31″W	Category B	17371	Upload Photo
Mansefield House And Garden Walls				55°15′10″N 3°44′53″W	Category B	17382	Upload Photo
Thornhill Village 1 West Morton Street				55°14′26″N 3°45′55″W	Category C(S)	17330	Upload Photo
Thornhill Village 138, 140 North Drumlanrig Street				55°14′31″N 3°46′01″W	Category B	17362	Upload Photo
Longmyre Farmhouse And North And South Ranges Of Steading				55°15′01″N 3°46′20″W	Category C(S)	17381	Upload Photo
Thornhill Village East Morton Street Joseph Thomson Monument				55°14′31″N 3°45′46″W	Category B	17338	Upload Photo
35 Carronbridge Village				55°15′50″N 3°46′47″W	Category C(S)	17352	Upload Photo
36 Carronbridge Village Learig				55°15′50″N 3°46′46″W	Category C(S)	17353	Upload Photo
Thornhill Village 112 South Drumlanrig Street/West Morton Street Buccleuch Hotel				55°14′25″N 3°45′54″W	Category B	17328	Upload Photo
Thornhill Village The Cross				55°14′27″N 3°45′54″W	Category A	17337	Upload another image
Burn Farmhouse And Steading				55°16′00″N 3°43′34″W	Category B	17349	Upload Photo
Carronbridge Village Carronbridge Sawmill				55°15′44″N 3°46′55″W	Category B	17354	Upload Photo
Thornhill Village 28, 29 North Drumlanrig Street				55°14′31″N 3°45′58″W	Category C(S)	17360	Upload Photo
Gill Burn Viaduct				55°17′14″N 3°45′51″W	Category B	17377	Upload Photo
Morton Mains Haybarn				55°16′40″N 3°45′11″W	Category B	17383	Upload Photo

== Key ==
The scheme for classifying buildings in Scotland is:

- Category A: "buildings of national or international importance, either architectural or historic; or fine, little-altered examples of some particular period, style or building type."
- Category B: "buildings of regional or more than local importance; or major examples of some particular period, style or building type, which may have been altered."
- Category C: "buildings of local importance; lesser examples of any period, style, or building type, as originally constructed or moderately altered; and simple traditional buildings which group well with other listed buildings."

In March 2016 there were 47,288 listed buildings in Scotland. Of these, 8% were Category A, and 50% were Category B, with the remaining 42% being Category C.
