= List of listed buildings in Dalton, Dumfries and Galloway =

This is a list of listed buildings in the parish of Dalton in Dumfries and Galloway, Scotland.

== List ==
Name	Location	Date listed	Geo-coordinates	Notes	Category	LB number	Image
Kirkwood House, Former Stables including Horsemill, Cottages and Kennels			55°03′43″N 3°22′50″W		C(S)	3373	Upload Photo
Almagill Hill, Monument to Joe Graham			55°04′06″N 3°25′40″W		B	3452	Upload Photo
Dalton Village, Dalton Old Parish Church, Churchyard and Gatepiers			55°03′09″N 3°23′17″W		A	3455	Upload another image
Dalton Village, Kobe and Stan Court and Garage adjoining			55°03′10″N 3°23′17″W		C(S)	3456	Upload Photo
Rammerscales, Former Stables			55°05′02″N 3°26′24″W		B	3796	Upload Photo
Manse Bridge (Minor Road Over Dalton Burn)			55°03′21″N 3°23′42″W		C(S)	3376	Upload Photo
Murraythwaite House, West Lodge			55°02′31″N 3°22′19″W		C(S)	3377	Upload Photo
Hetland House			55°02′10″N 3°25′25″W		B	3464	Upload Photo
Dalton Village, Thistle Cottage			55°03′08″N 3°23′06″W		C(S)	3468	Upload Photo
Dormont, Williamwath Lodges			55°04′17″N 3°23′06″W		B	3461	Upload Photo
Hetland Cottage (at Hetland Road-End)			55°02′06″N 3°25′00″W		B	3463	Upload Photo
Rammerscales, Garden Wall			55°05′01″N 3°26′17″W		B	3795	Upload Photo
Rammerscales House			55°05′05″N 3°26′23″W		A	3378	Upload another image
Dalton Village, School, Playground Walls and Gatepiers			55°03′09″N 3°22′47″W		C(S)	3467	Upload Photo
Dormont Grange House			55°03′38″N 3°23′32″W		C(S)	3474	Upload Photo
Dalton Village, Dalton Parish Church			55°03′09″N 3°23′19″W		B	3458	Upload another image
Dalton Village, Old Schoolhouse			55°03′07″N 3°23′06″W		C(S)	3457	Upload another image
Dalton Village, Finial from Old Parish Church			55°03′09″N 3°23′17″W		B	3459	Upload Photo
Dormont, West Lodge and Gatepiers			55°03′42″N 3°23′46″W		B	3460	Upload Photo
Dalton Village, Rose Cottage			55°03′09″N 3°23′08″W		C(S)	3466	Upload Photo
Denbie House			55°02′35″N 3°23′34″W		A	3469	Upload Photo
Denbie, Dovecot			55°02′39″N 3°23′46″W		A	3470	Upload Photo
Denbie, Former Stables and Kennels			55°02′35″N 3°23′44″W		B	3472	Upload Photo
Kirkwood, West Lodge and Gatepiers			55°03′48″N 3°23′07″W		C(S)	3374	Upload Photo
Flosh Bridge			55°03′46″N 3°23′53″W		C(S)	3462	Upload Photo
Kirkwood House			55°03′49″N 3°22′37″W		B	3465	Upload Photo
Denbie, Walled Garden			55°02′34″N 3°23′35″W		B	3471	Upload Photo
Rammerscales, Wellhead			55°05′04″N 3°26′26″W		B	3794	Upload Photo
Williamwath Bridge over River Annan			55°04′17″N 3°23′03″W		B	3797	Upload another image
Denbie, Lodge and Gatepiers			55°02′41″N 3°24′03″W		C(S)	3473	Upload Photo

== Key ==
The scheme for classifying buildings in Scotland is:

- Category A: "buildings of national or international importance, either architectural or historic; or fine, little-altered examples of some particular period, style or building type."
- Category B: "buildings of regional or more than local importance; or major examples of some particular period, style or building type, which may have been altered."
- Category C: "buildings of local importance; lesser examples of any period, style, or building type, as originally constructed or moderately altered; and simple traditional buildings which group well with other listed buildings."

In March 2016 there were 47,288 listed buildings in Scotland. Of these, 8% were Category A, and 50% were Category B, with the remaining 42% being Category C.
