= Kirkgunzeon railway station =

Disused railway station in Kirkgunzeon, Dumfries and Galloway

Kirkgunzeon
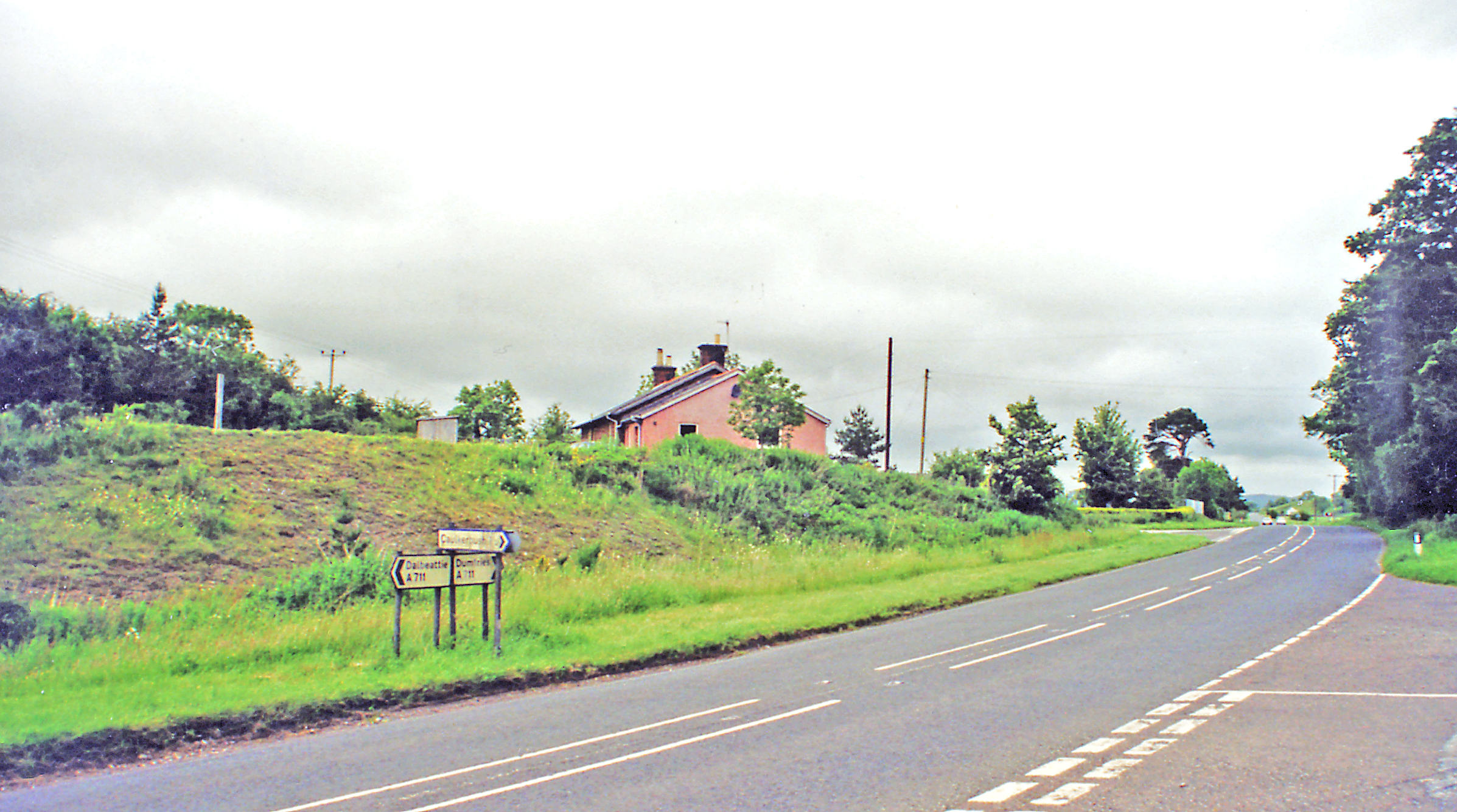
- The site of the station, looking north towards the former line, in 2000

General information
- Location: Kirkgunzeon, Dumfries and Galloway; Scotland
- Coordinates: 54.9793°N 3.7643°W
- Grid reference: NX871663
- Platforms: 2

Other information
- Status: Disused

History
- Original company: Glasgow and South Western Railway
- Pre-grouping: Glasgow and South Western Railway
- Post-grouping: London, Midland and Scottish Railway; British Railways (Scottish Region)

Key dates
- 7 November 1859: Opened
- 2 January 1950: Closed to passengers
- 1 July 1959: Closed completely
Location

Kirkgunzeon railway station served the village of Kirkgunzeon, Dumfries and Galloway, Scotland from 1859 to 1950 on the Castle Douglas and Dumfries Railway.

== History ==
The station opened on 7 November 1859 by the Glasgow and South Western Railway. The goods yard and the signal box, which opened in 1878, were to the east. The signal box closed in 1946, being replaced by a ground frame. The station closed to passengers on 2 January 1950 and closed to goods on 1 July 1959. The site is now a caravan park.

Preceding station	Disused railways	Following station
Southwick (Dumfries & Galloway); Line and station closed	Glasgow and South Western Railway; Castle Douglas and Dumfries Railway	Killywhan; Line and station closed
