= Southwick railway station (Scotland) =

Disused railway station in Colvend and Southwick, Dumfries and Galloway

Southwick (Dumfries & Galloway)
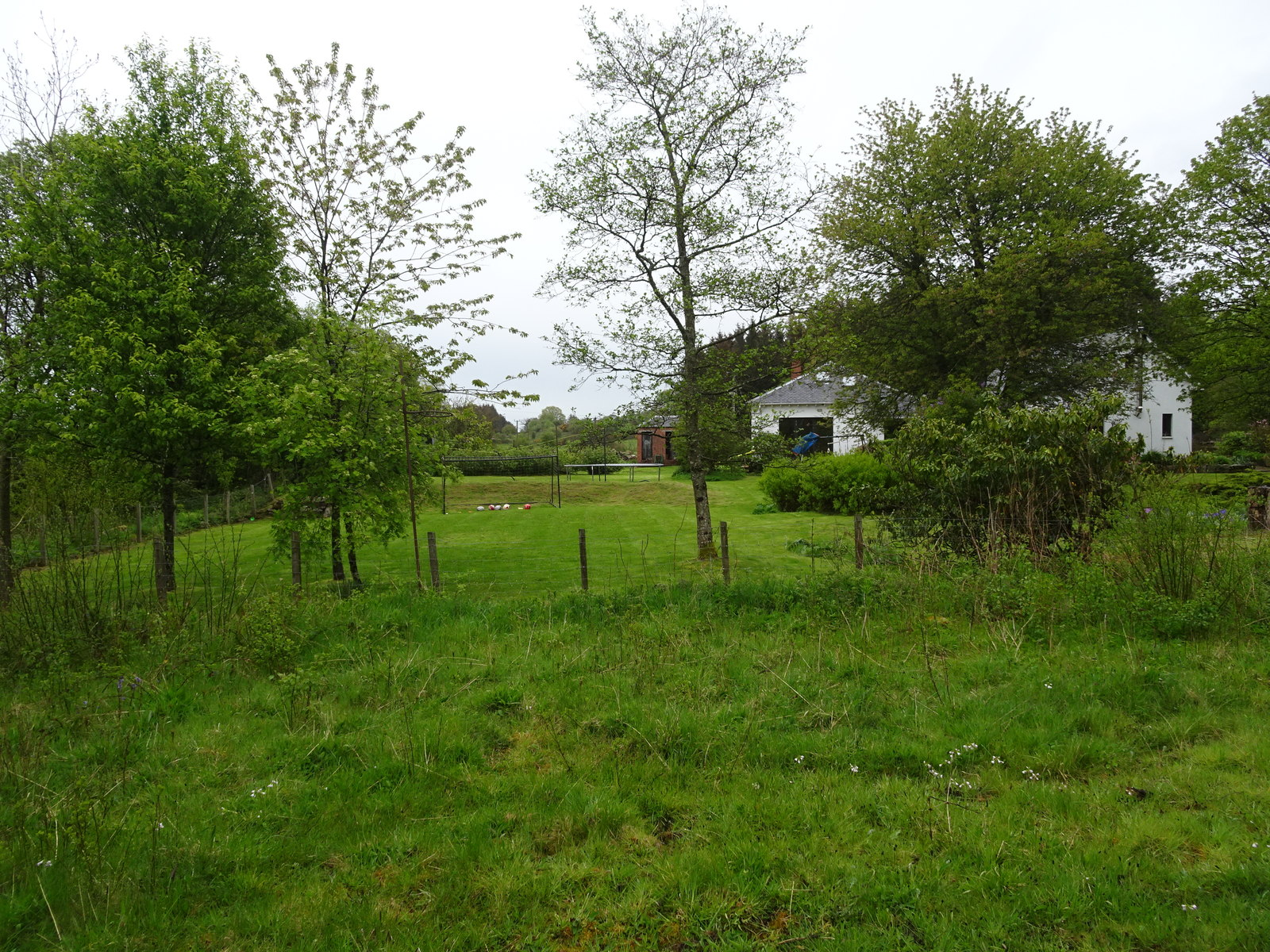
- The site of the station, looking northeast towards Kirkgunzeon, in 2019

General information
- Location: Colvend and Southwick, Dumfries and Galloway; Scotland
- Coordinates: 54.9523°N 3.7881°W
- Grid reference: NX855634
- Platforms: 2

Other information
- Status: Disused

History
- Original company: Glasgow and South Western Railway
- Pre-grouping: Glasgow and South Western Railway
- Post-grouping: London, Midland and Scottish Railway; British Rail (Scottish Region)

Key dates
- 7 November 1859: Opened
- 25 September 1939: Closed temporarily
- 3 February 1941: Reopened
- 3 May 1965: Closed
Location

Southwick (Dumfries & Galloway) railway station served the civil parish of Colvend and Southwick, Dumfries and Galloway, Scotland from 1859 to 1965 on the Castle Douglas and Dumfries Railway.

== History ==
The station opened on 7 November 1859 by the Glasgow and South Western Railway. To the west was a signal box, which opened in 1878, and a siding were to the west. In 1940, ICI Nobel opened a factory at Southwick Ammunition Factory which was served by two sets of sidings in the west: Southwick Factory Siding and Maidenholm Sidings. The signal box closed in 1961 and the station closed on 3 May 1965.

Preceding station	Disused railways	Following station
Dalbeattie; Line and station closed	Glasgow and South Western Railway; Castle Douglas and Dumfries Railway	Kirkgunzeon; Line and station closed
