= Buittle railway station =

Disused railway station in Dumfries and Galloway, Scotland

Buittle
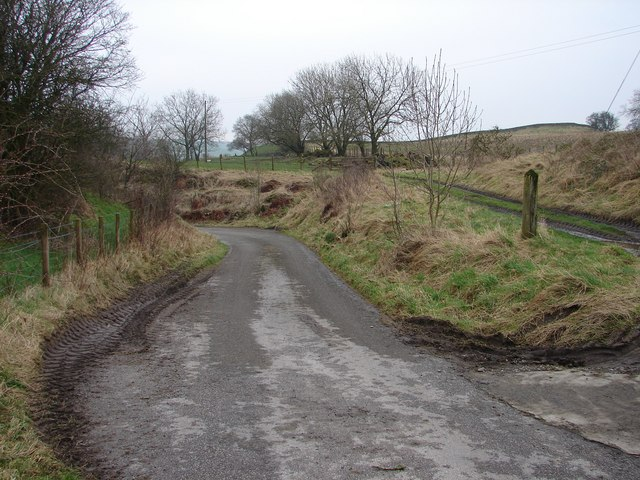
- The site of the station in 2008

General information
- Location: Buittle, Dumfries and Galloway; Scotland
- Coordinates: 54.9569°N 3.8585°W
- Grid reference: NX810640
- Platforms: 1

Other information
- Status: Disused

History
- Original company: Glasgow and South Western Railway
- Pre-grouping: Glasgow and South Western Railway

Key dates
- July 1862: Opened
- 1 August 1894: Closed
Location

Buittle railway station, also known as Buittle Halt, Buittle Mill and Buittle Mill Halt, served the civil parish of Buittle, Dumfries and Galloway, Scotland from 1862 to 1894 on the Castle Douglas and Dumfries Railway.

== History ==
The station opened in July 1862 by the Glasgow and South Western Railway. Trains only called here on Wednesday with one in each direction. It was known as Buittle Mill in the local press. The station closed on 1 August 1894 when the line was doubled.

Preceding station	Disused railways	Following station
Castle Douglas; Line and station closed	Glasgow and South Western Railway; Castle Douglas and Dumfries Railway	Dalbeattie; Line and station closed
