= Killywhan railway station =

Railway station in Dumfries and Galloway, Scotland

Killywhan
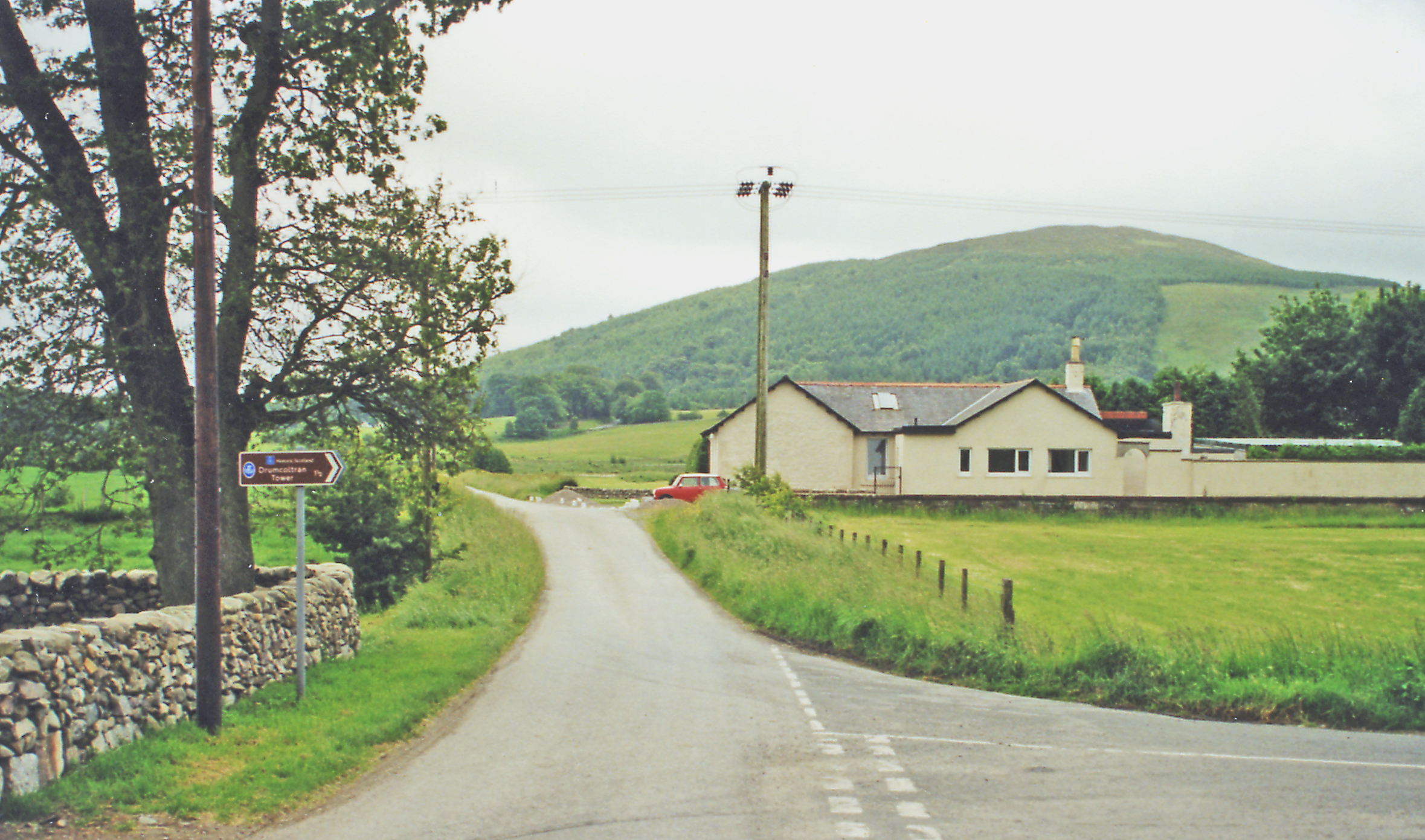

General information
- Location: Killywhan, Dumfries and Galloway; Scotland
- Coordinates: 55.0065°N 3.739°W
- Grid reference: NX888693
- Platforms: 2

Other information
- Status: Disused

History
- Original company: Glasgow and South Western Railway
- Pre-grouping: Glasgow and South Western Railway
- Post-grouping: London, Midland and Scottish Railway; British Railways (Scottish Region)

Key dates
- 7 November 1859: Opened
- 3 August 1959: Closed
Location

Killywhan railway station served the hamlet of Killywhan, Dumfries and Galloway, Scotland from 1859 to 1959 on the Castle Douglas and Dumfries Railway.

== History ==
The station opened on 7 November 1859 by the Glasgow and South Western Railway. To the east was a goods yard and to the west was the signal box which opened in 1878. The station closed to both passengers and goods traffic on 3 August 1959.

Preceding station	Disused railways	Following station
Kirkgunzeon; Line and station closed	Glasgow and South Western Railway; Castle Douglas and Dumfries Railway	Lochanhead; Line and station closed
