= Dalbeattie railway station =

Disused railway station in Dalbeattie, Dumfries and Galloway

Dalbeattie
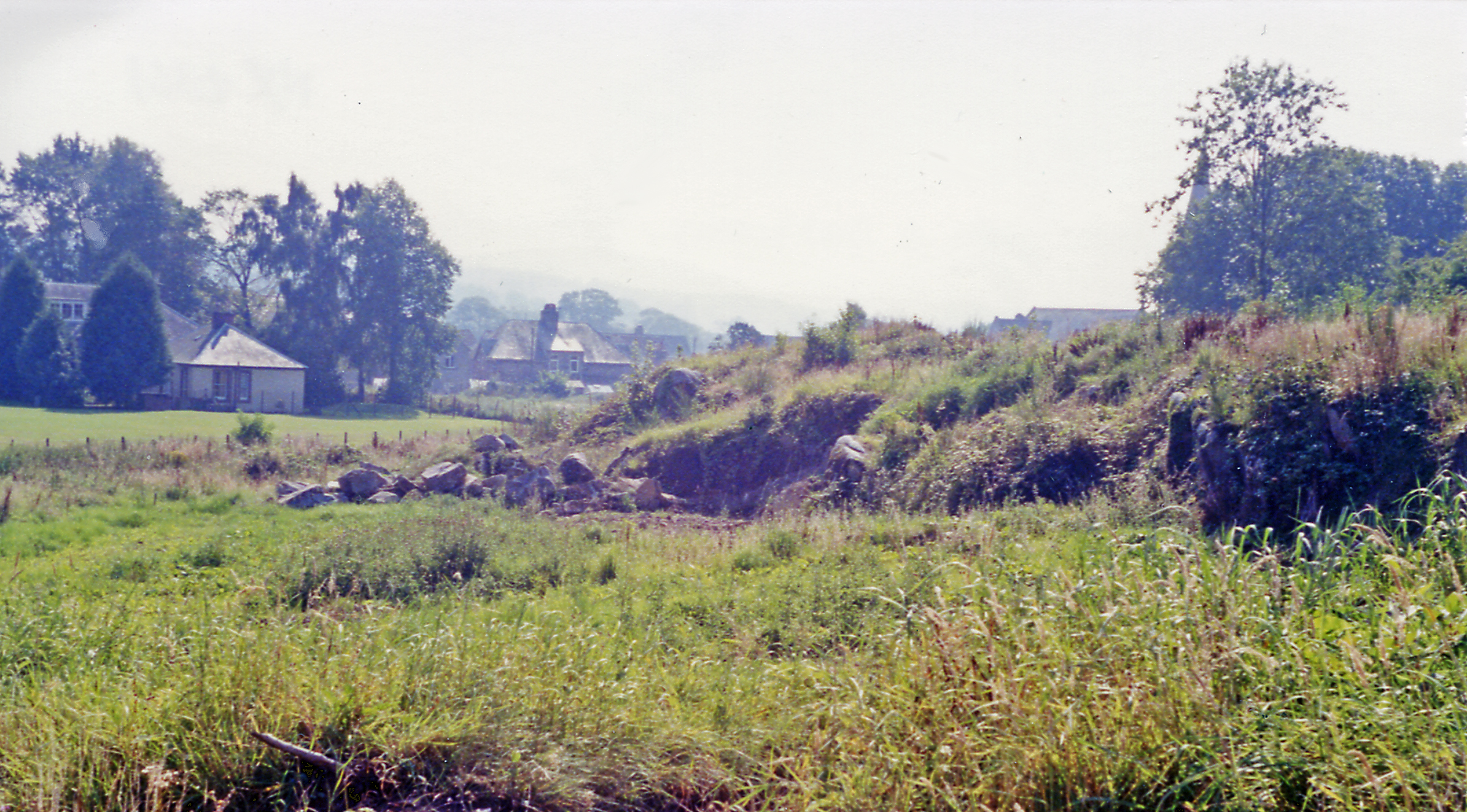
- The site of the station in 1991

General information
- Location: Dalbeattie, Dumfries and Galloway; Scotland
- Coordinates: 54.935003°N 3.826944°W
- Grid reference: NX 83050 61559
- Platforms: 2

Other information
- Status: Disused

History
- Original company: Glasgow and South Western Railway
- Pre-grouping: Glasgow and South Western Railway
- Post-grouping: London, Midland and Scottish Railway; British Rail (Scottish Region)

Key dates
- 7 November 1859: Opened
- 14 June 1965: Closed
Location

Dalbeattie railway station served the town of Dalbeattie, Dumfries and Galloway, Scotland from 1859 to 1965 on the Castle Douglas and Dumfries Railway.

== History ==
The station was opened on 7 November 1859 by the Glasgow and South Western Railway. To the west was the signal box and a siding to the north served Dalbeattie Creamery.

The goods yard was situated to the south of the line and was equipped with a 7 ton crane. The yard was able to accommodate livestock.

The station was host to a LMS camping coach in 1935 and 1936 and possibly in 1937.

The station, as well as the signal box and the line, closed on 14 June 1965.

== Station Site Today ==
The down platform building was demolished after closure and they were eventually infilled when a bus station replaced the station. The up platform building was kept but the bus station was eventually closed and the building demolished. The area has now been repurposed as a residential area and Station Drive was built upon the site.

| Preceding station | Disused railways | Following station |
|---|---|---|
| Buittle; Line and station closed | Glasgow and South Western Railway; Castle Douglas and Dumfries Railway | Southwick (Dumfries & Galloway); Line and station closed |
