= Auchenskeoch Castle =

Castle in Dumfries and Galloway, Scotland

Auchenskeoch within Castle Farm
- Near Dalbeattie, Dumfries and Galloway, Scotland; Ordnance Survey grid reference NX918589
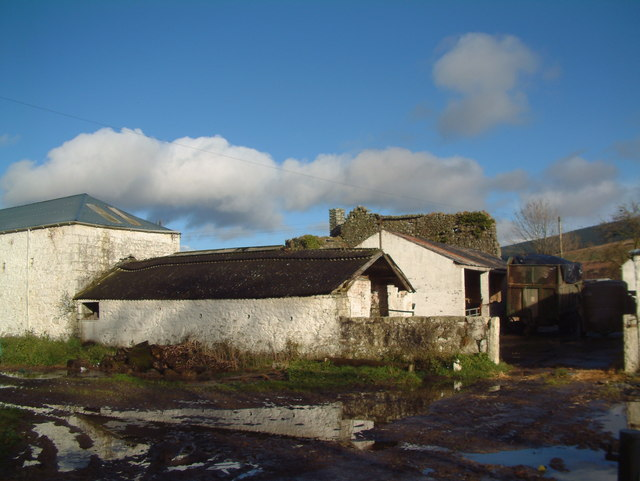
- Auchenskeoch within Castle Farm

Site information
- Type: Z-plan tower house
- Owner: Private
- Condition: Ruined

Location
- Coordinates: 54.913504°N 3.688609°W

Site history
- Built: 17th century
- Materials: Stone

Scheduled monument
- Official name: Auchenskeock Castle
- Type: Secular: castle
- Designated: 20 June 2002
- Reference no.: SM10434

Auchenskeoch Tower is a 17th-century tower house situated in Dumfries and Galloway, south-west Scotland. It is near Dalbeattie in the civil parish of Colvend and Southwick, in the county of Kirkcudbrightshire. It is thought to be built on a Z-plan, making it the only such tower in Galloway. Dalswinton Tower in the neighbouring county of Dumfriesshire is the only other example in Dumfries and Galloway. The remains of the tower are within the modern Castle Farm and are a scheduled monument.
