= Castle Douglas railway station =

Disused railway station in Castle Douglas, Dumfries and Galloway

Castle Douglas
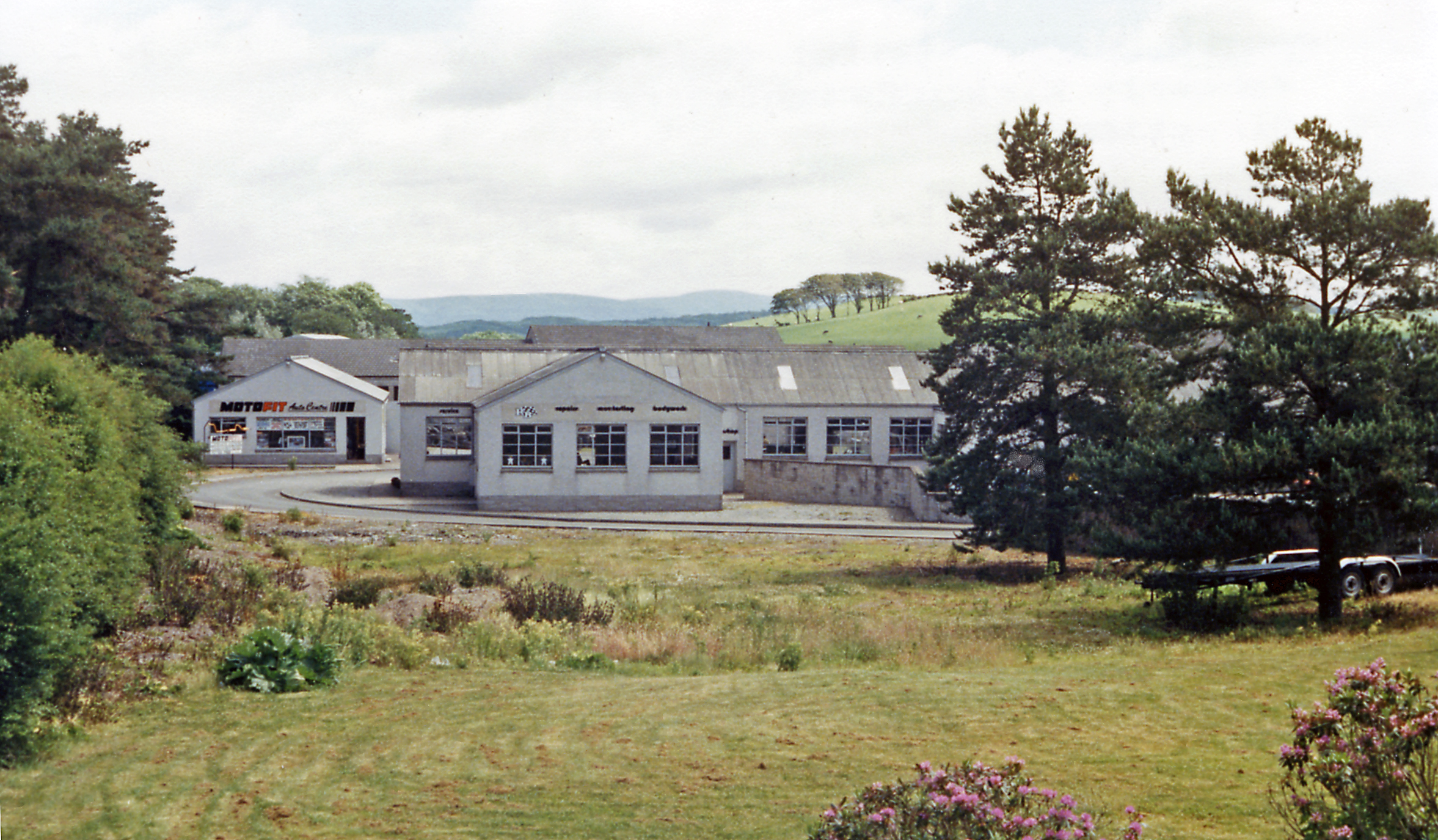
- The site of the station entrance looking east towards Dumfries in 1986

General information
- Location: Castle Douglas, Dumfries and Galloway; Scotland
- Coordinates: 54.9449°N 3.9235°W
- Grid reference: NX768628
- Platforms: 2

Other information
- Status: Disused

History
- Original company: Glasgow and South Western Railway
- Pre-grouping: Glasgow and South Western Railway
- Post-grouping: London, Midland and Scottish Railway; British Rail (Scottish Region)

Key dates
- 7 November 1859: Opened
- 14 June 1965: Closed
Location

Castle Douglas railway station served the town of Castle Douglas, in the historic county of Kirkcudbrightshire in the administrative area of Dumfries and Galloway, Scotland from 1859 to 1965 on the Castle Douglas and Dumfries Railway.

== History ==
The station opened on 7 November 1859 by the Glasgow and South Western Railway. To the south was the goods yard and to the north was an engine shed. There were two signal boxes, one to the east and one at the junction to the west. The lines for the goods yard were removed in 1959 and the station, as well as the signal boxes, was closed on 14 June 1965. After closure the station was demolished and the site redeveloped with industrial buildings,

Preceding station	Disused railways	Following station
Terminus	Glasgow and South Western Railway; Castle Douglas and Dumfries Railway	Buittle; Line and station closed
