= Lochanhead railway station =

Disused railway station in Lochanhead, Dumfries and Galloway

Lochanhead
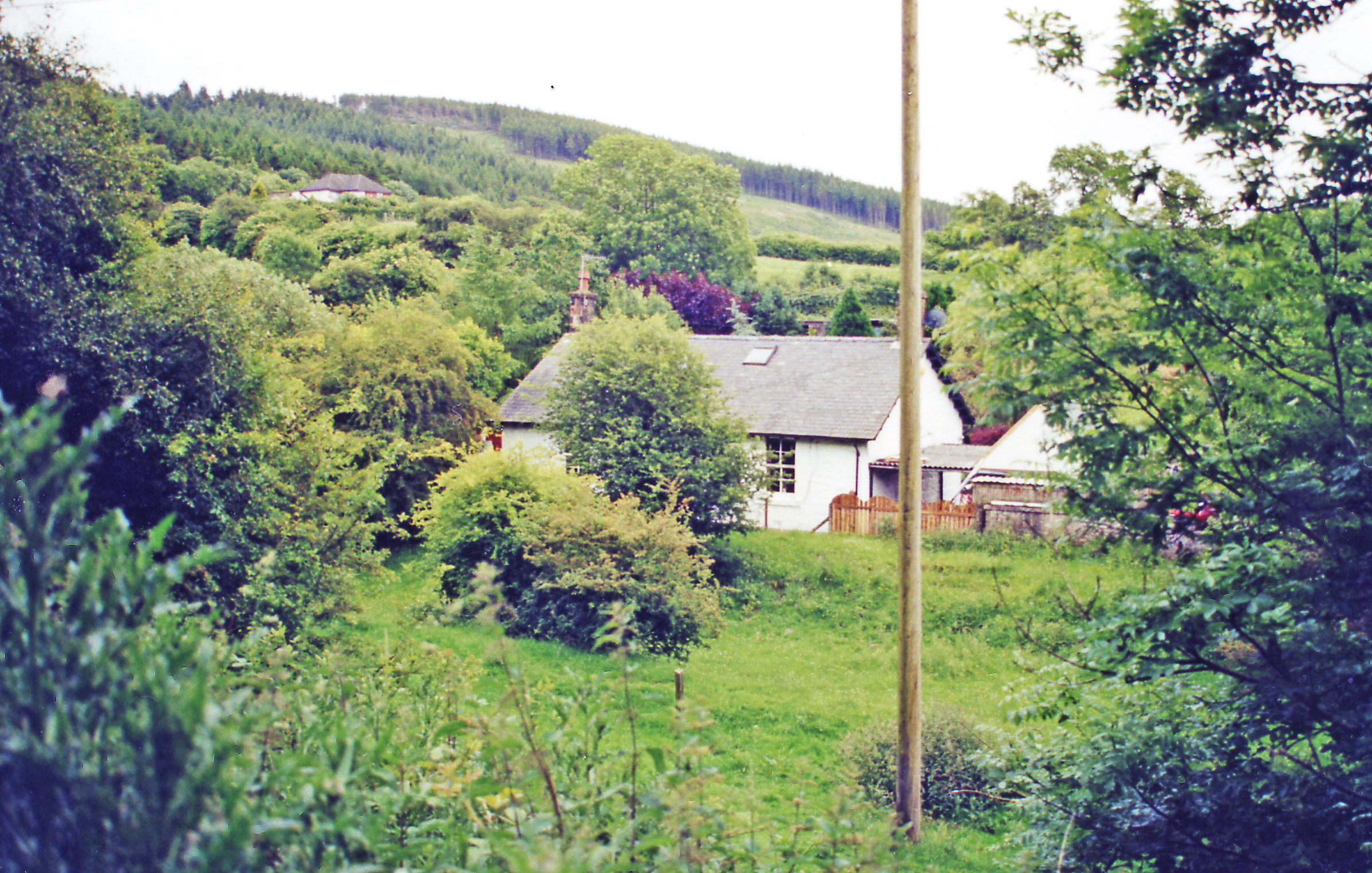
- The site of the station in 2000

General information
- Location: Lochanhead, Dumfries and Galloway; Scotland
- Coordinates: 55.0274°N 3.6978°W
- Grid reference: NX915716
- Platforms: 2

Other information
- Status: Disused

History
- Original company: Glasgow and South Western Railway
- Pre-grouping: Glasgow and South Western Railway
- Post-grouping: London, Midland and Scottish Railway; British Railways (Scottish Region)

Key dates
- 7 November 1859: Opened
- 25 September 1939: Closed to passengers
- May 1947: Closed completely
Location

Lochanhead railway station served the settlement of Lochanhead, Dumfries and Galloway, Scotland from 1859 to 1965 on the Castle Douglas and Dumfries Railway.

== History ==
The station opened on 7 November 1859 by the Glasgow and South Western Railway. To the west was the goods yard and the signal box when it opened in 1878. The station closed for passengers on 25 September 1939 and closed in May 1947 to goods traffic.

Preceding station	Historical railways	Following station
Killywhan; Line and station closed	Glasgow and South Western Railway; Castle Douglas and Dumfries Railway	Maxwelltown; Line and station closed
