= List of listed buildings in Colvend and Southwick =

This is a list of listed buildings in the parish of Colvend and Southwick, Dumfries and Galloway, Scotland.

== List ==
Name	Location	Date Listed	Grid Ref. (Note: Sometimes known as OSGB36, the grid reference (where provided) is based on the British national grid reference system used by the Ordnance Survey. • "Guide to National Grid". Ordnance Survey. • "Get-a-map". Ordnance Survey.)	Geo-coordinates	Notes	LB Number (Note: Historic Environment Scotland assign a unique alphanumeric identifier to each designated site in Scotland, for listed buildings this always begins with "LB", for example "LB12345".)	Image
Kipp Lodge				54°53′03″N 3°48′24″W	Category C(S)	3718	Upload Photo
Auchenskeoch Castle				54°54′46″N 3°41′25″W	Category B	3709	Upload Photo
Drumstinchall				54°54′15″N 3°44′29″W	Category B	3713	Upload Photo
Shawfoot Cottage, Caulkerbush				54°53′53″N 3°40′35″W	Category B	3721	Upload Photo
Barnhourie Mill				54°52′49″N 3°43′54″W	Category B	3710	Upload Photo
Southwick Home Farm				54°53′45″N 3°39′34″W	Category A	3723	Upload another image
Southwick House				54°54′01″N 3°40′11″W	Category B	3724	Upload Photo
Fairgirth House				54°53′28″N 3°44′57″W	Category B	3700	Upload Photo
Kipp House				54°53′00″N 3°48′19″W	Category B	3702	Upload Photo
Saltflats, Rockcliffe				54°51′57″N 3°47′54″W	Category C(S)	3720	Upload Photo
Southwick Parish Church (Church Of Scotland)				54°53′58″N 3°40′27″W	Category B	1646	Upload another image See more images
Colvend Church, Church Of Scotland, And Churchyard				54°52′08″N 3°46′29″W	Category B	3712	Upload another image See more images
Whim Cottage, Kippford				54°52′36″N 3°48′48″W	Category C(S)	3716	Upload Photo
Southwick House Stables				54°53′52″N 3°40′15″W	Category B	3725	Upload Photo
Boreland Of Southwick				54°55′31″N 3°41′03″W	Category B	3711	Upload Photo
Southwick Old Churchyard, excluding Scheduled Monument No 7876 ‘Southwick Church’, near Caulkerbush				54°53′43″N 3°42′24″W	Category B	3715	Upload another image See more images
Woodside Bridge				54°54′24″N 3°40′31″W	Category B	3717	Upload Photo
Nether Glensone And Barn				54°55′04″N 3°41′29″W	Category B	3719	Upload Photo
Glensone				54°55′15″N 3°42′33″W	Category C(S)	3701	Upload Photo

== Key ==
The scheme for classifying buildings in Scotland is:

- Category A: "buildings of national or international importance, either architectural or historic; or fine, little-altered examples of some particular period, style or building type."
- Category B: "buildings of regional or more than local importance; or major examples of some particular period, style or building type, which may have been altered."
- Category C: "buildings of local importance; lesser examples of any period, style, or building type, as originally constructed or moderately altered; and simple traditional buildings which group well with other listed buildings."

In March 2016 there were 47,288 listed buildings in Scotland. Of these, 8% were Category A, and 50% were Category B, with the remaining 42% being Category C.
