= List of listed buildings in Kirkgunzeon, Dumfries and Galloway =

This is a list of listed buildings in the parish of Kirkgunzeon, in Dumfries and Galloway, Scotland.

== List ==
Name	Location	Date listed	Grid ref. (Note: Sometimes known as OSGB36, the grid reference (where provided) is based on the British national grid reference system used by the Ordnance Survey. • "Guide to National Grid". Ordnance Survey. • "Get-a-map". Ordnance Survey.)	Geo-coordinates	Notes	LB number (Note: Historic Environment Scotland assign a unique alphanumeric identifier to each designated site in Scotland, for listed buildings this always begins with "LB", for example "LB12345".)	Image
Drumcoltran Tower, And Adjacent Farmhouse				54°59′47″N 3°46′07″W	Category A	9673	Upload another image
Camphill Village Community, Lotus House				55°00′06″N 3°43′30″W	Category B	9675	Upload Photo
Kirkgunzeon, Mansepark House, (Formerly Rowanglen)				54°58′57″N 3°46′25″W	Category B	9676	Upload Photo
Kirkgunzeon Parish Church, Churchyard Walls And Tombstones (Church Of Scotland)				54°58′58″N 3°46′24″W	Category B	9677	Upload another image
Kirkgunzeon, Bridge Over Kirkgunzeon Lane				54°58′37″N 3°46′16″W	Category C(S)	9674	Upload another image
Camphill Village Community, Lotus House, Walled Garden, Garden Cottage And Stables Cottage, Barn And Kennels				55°00′04″N 3°43′27″W	Category C(S)	9671	Upload Photo
Kirkgunzeon Parish Church Graveyard, Mcwhire Monument				54°58′58″N 3°46′23″W	Category B	9678	Upload another image
Corra Castle				54°58′38″N 3°46′21″W	Category B	9672	Upload another image

== Key ==
The scheme for classifying buildings in Scotland is:

- Category A: "buildings of national or international importance, either architectural or historic; or fine, little-altered examples of some particular period, style or building type."
- Category B: "buildings of regional or more than local importance; or major examples of some particular period, style or building type, which may have been altered."
- Category C: "buildings of local importance; lesser examples of any period, style, or building type, as originally constructed or moderately altered; and simple traditional buildings which group well with other listed buildings."

In March 2016 there were 47,288 listed buildings in Scotland. Of these, 8% were Category A, and 50% were Category B, with the remaining 42% being Category C.
