= County Buildings, Kirkcudbright =

County building in Kirkcudbright, Scotland

County Buildings
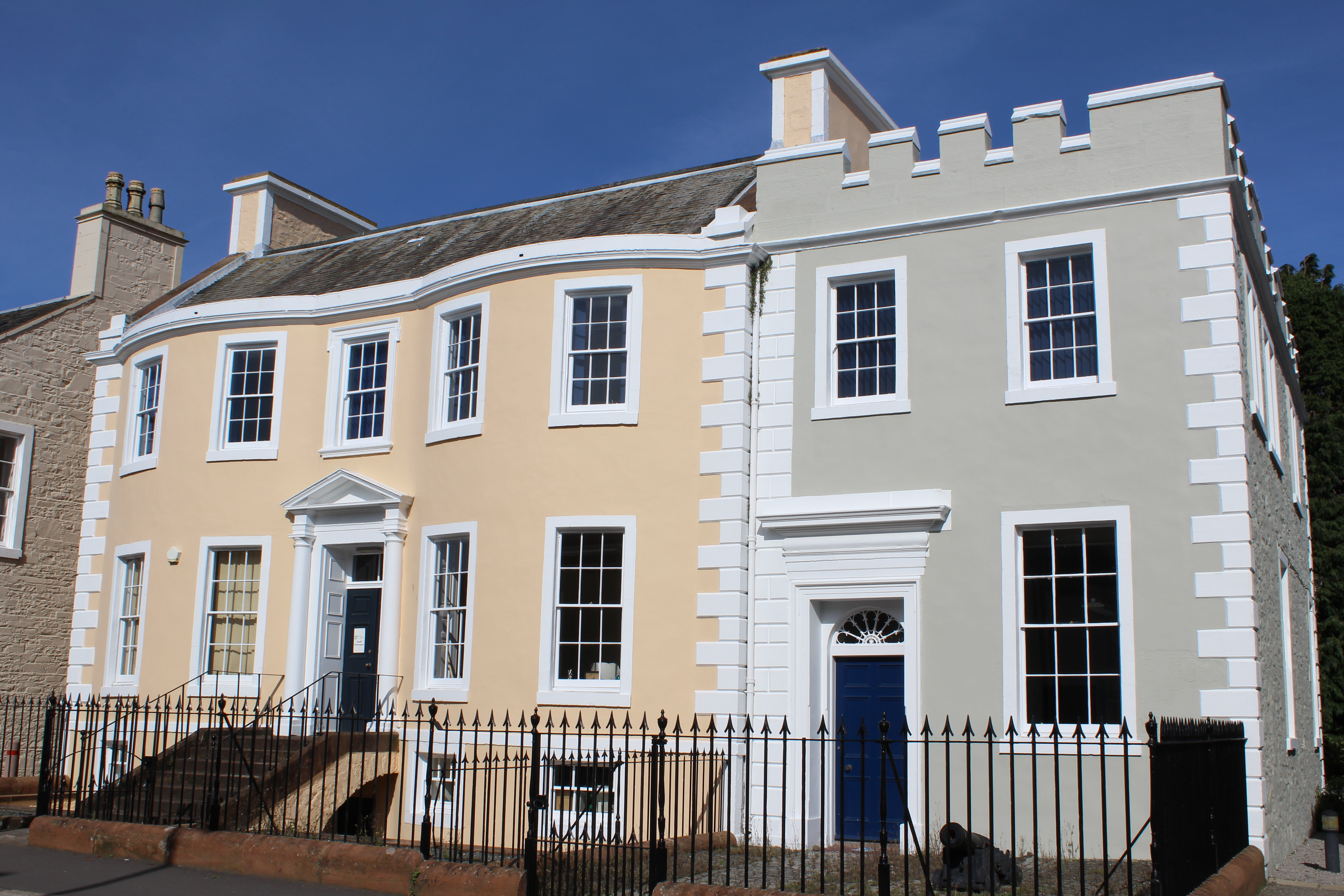
- 121–123 High Street, Kirkcudbright

- Location within Dumfries and Galloway
- 54.83531°N 4.05226°W
- Location: Daar Road; Kirkcudbright; DG6 4JG

Listed Building – Category B
- Official name: Stewartry District Council Offices, High Street, Kirkcudbright
- Designated: 4 November 1971
- Reference no.: LB36523

County Buildings is a municipal building in Kirkcudbright, in the Dumfries and Galloway council area in Scotland. It was originally two houses on High Street, which then served as the main offices of Kirkcudbrightshire County Council from 1925 to 1975. A large extension to the rear was added in 1952, accessed from Daar Road. From 1975 until 1996 the building served as the offices of Stewartry District Council. Since 1996, it has been an area office of Dumfries and Galloway Council. It is a Category B listed building. Prior to the 1952 extension the name "County Buildings" was used for a different building, at 85 High Street, which was also the town's sheriff court.

== History ==
The Kirkcudbrightshire Commissioners of Supply served as the main administrative body for the county from 1667 until 1890 when the county council was created and took over most of the commissioners' functions. The commissioners met at Kirkcudbright Tolbooth until 1788, when they moved to a new courthouse at 85 High Street. That courthouse was then rebuilt in 1868 to the designs of David Rhind, incorporating an earlier jail building of 1815 to the rear. The rebuilt courthouse was named County Buildings and served as a sheriff's court and meeting place for the commissioners.

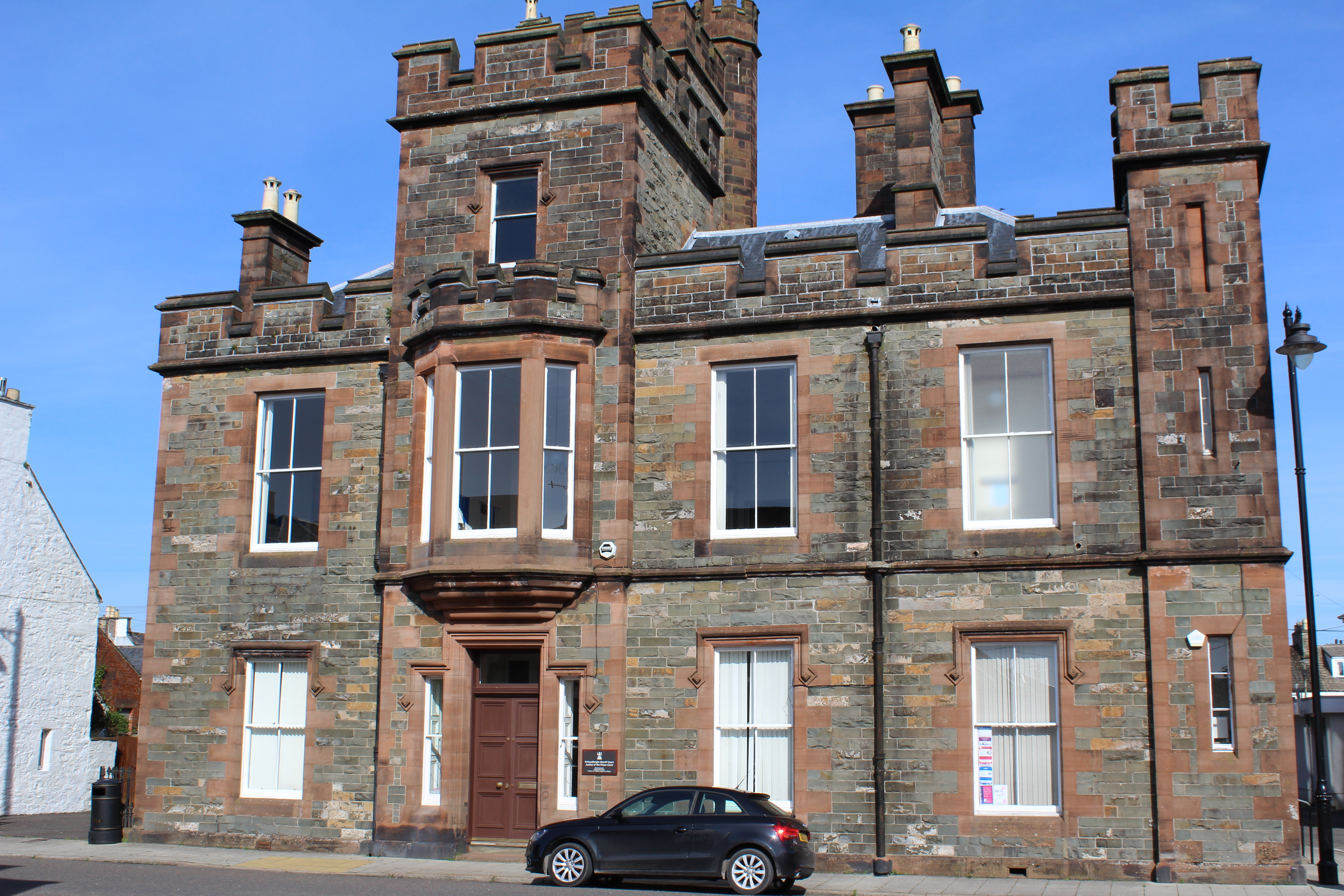
Old County Buildings and Sheriff Court, 85 High Street, Kirkcudbright

Kirkcudbrightshire County Council was created in 1890 under the Local Government (Scotland) Act 1889, which established elected county councils in Scotland. During preliminary meetings the question of where the new council should meet was discussed. Some advocated that the council should meet at Castle Douglas, which had better railway connections than the county town of Kirkcudbright. However, it was decided that the council would meet at the existing County Buildings in Kirkcudbright. The first meeting of the county council was held there on 22 May 1890.

The county council needed more office space than was available at the County Buildings, and so various other properties were also used to accommodate the council's staff. In 1925 the county council bought a house called Bank House at 119 High Street for £950, converting it to become their main offices, with council meetings continuing to be held at the County Buildings.

Bank House is a late eighteenth century house, with a painted stucco front of five bays, with the outer pairs of bays on each side being bowed. The attached house on the east side of Bank House was added in the early nineteenth century, and also has a painted stucco front, but with a castellated parapet. The two houses were later renumbered 121–123 High Street.

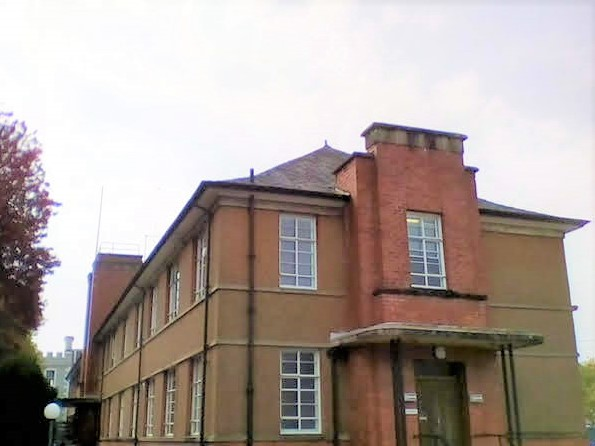
The 1952 extension from Daar Road

By the early 1950s the county council had outgrown 121–123 High Street. The council decided to add a large new extension to the rear, almost being a separate building, but linked to the older building by a corridor. The new extension was designed by Archibald Thomson Caldwell, the county architect, and built between 1950 and 1952. It incorporated offices for the staff, committee rooms, and an oak-panelled council chamber with depictions of the coats of arms of the county's five burghs on the walls. The older part at 121–123 High Street was remodelled internally at the same time and continued to serve as office space for the council. The new building and the older houses were together renamed County Buildings, with the old County Buildings at 85 High Street thereafter being known instead as the Sheriff Court. The new building cost £35,000 and was formally opened on 6 March 1952 by Alec Douglas-Home.

The 1952 extension is a two-storey building, mostly rendered but with red brick towers marking the main entrances. It was designed with its principal elevation facing eastwards towards a proposed public garden off a new access road called Daar Road. The garden plan never came to fruition, with the land for it remaining in the ownership of the adjoining Selkirk Arms Hotel. As such, the main elevation of the 1952 building can only be viewed obliquely from Daar Road or glimpsed from the garden of the Selkirk Arms.

Kirkcudbrightshire County Council was abolished in 1975, when local government in Scotland was reorganised into upper-tier regions and lower-tier districts. Kirkcudbrightshire became part of the Dumfries and Galloway region, with most of the historic county becoming part of the Stewartry district. Stewartry District Council took over the County Buildings in Kirkcudbright to serve as its headquarters. Since the district council's abolition in 1996 the building has been an area office of Dumfries and Galloway Council, with meetings of the council's Stewartry Area Committee continuing to be held in the 1952 council chamber. The town's library was relocated into the building in 2016 from its previous location in the Sheriff Court building when that building was closed and subsequently sold.
