= Colvend and Southwick =

Civil parish in Dumfries and Galloway, Scotland

Coordinates: 54.871°N 3.769°W

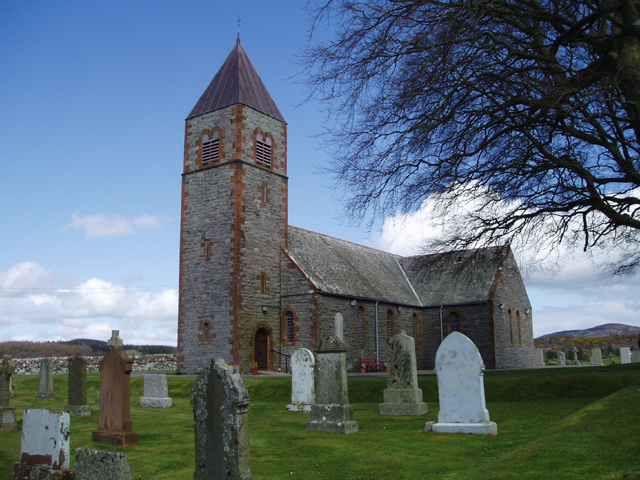
Colvend Parish Church

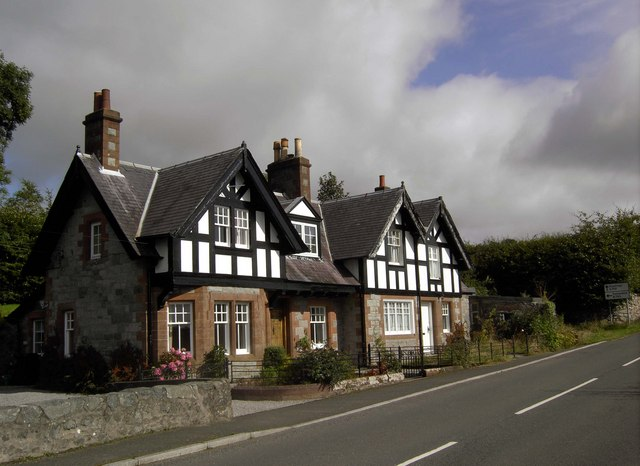
Houses in Caulkerbush

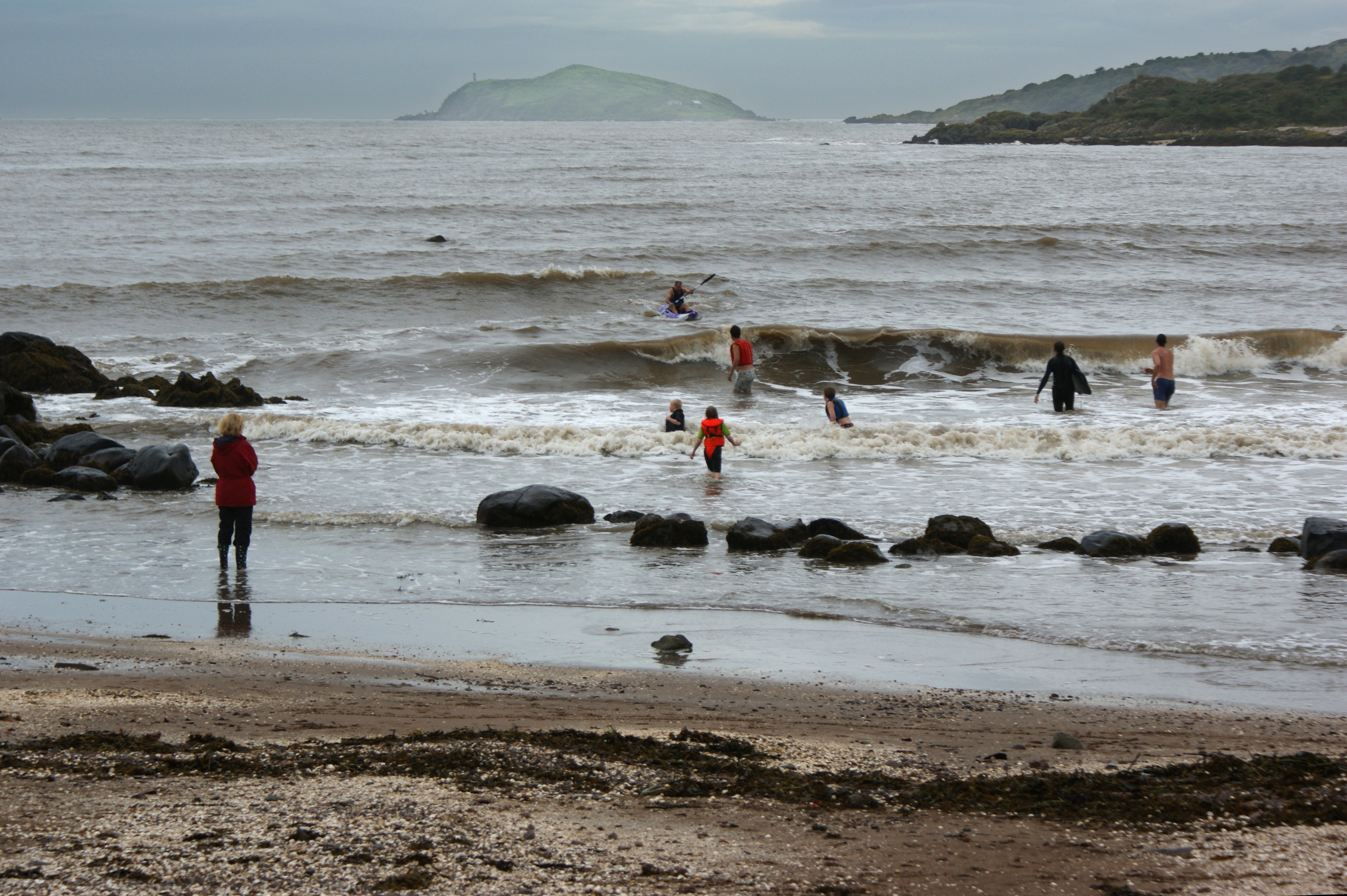
Rollers at Rockliffe Beach with Hestan Island in the distance.

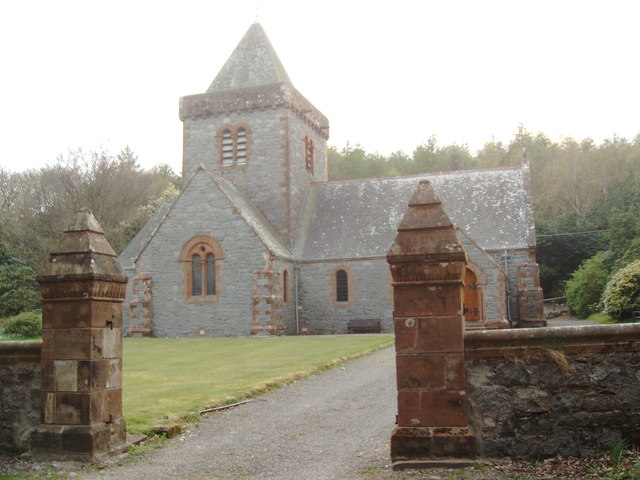
Southwick Church at Caulkerbush

Colvend and Southwick is a community council area and civil parish within the Stewartry area of Dumfries and Galloway, Scotland. It is also part of the Church of Scotland parish of Colvend, Southwick and Kirkbean. It is in the historic county of Kirkcudbrightshire.

Colvend Church was designed by architect Peter MacGregor Chalmers in 1911.

Southwick Church designed by Peddie & Kinnear 1891.

Southwick House, C18th/19th mansion house, home of Sir Mark McTaggart-Stewart MP, Baronet (1834 -1923), MP for Wigtown Burghs from 1874–80 Kirkcudbrightshire between 1885 and 1910.

== From A topographical dictionary of Scotland (1846) ==
In 1846 the Civil Parish contained 1495 inhabitants, of whom 875 were in Colvend. The former of these places is supposed to have derived its name from John de Culwen, its proprietor in the fifteenth century, and the latter from the position of its ancient church, now in ruins, with reference to a small river which flows through the parish into Solway Firth.

After the dilapidation of the church of Southwick, that parish was annexed to Colvend, with which it has been united from the time of the Reformation.

The parish extended for about eight miles from north-east to south-west, and was partly bounded on the south-east by the Solway Firth. It was nearly four miles and the river Urr formed its south-western limit.

The surface is extremely irregular, and is so broken into detached portions by intervening masses of rock and impenetrable copses of furze and briars, as to render it unpracticable to ascertain, with any degree of correctness, the probable number of acres under cultivation. The ground in some parts rises into numerous hills of moderate height, and in other parts, especially towards the north, into mountainous elevation forming a chain of heights skirting the lofty and conspicuous mountain of Criffel. For nearly two miles along the eastern coast the surface is tolerably level, and divided into several fields of good arable land. The coast is bold and rocky, and in many places rises into lofty and precipitous cliffs, overhanging the Firth, from which, at low water, the sea retires, leaving a broad tract of level sands. In the crevices of these rocks is found abundance of samphire, of which considerable quantities are collected with great hazard. The Firth is about nine leagues in breadth at this place; the river Urr is navigable for eight miles from it, for vessels of not more than eighty tons, and the Southwick burn joins the Frith on the boundary of the parish. The salmon-fishery is carried on upon a small scale, and during the season smelts are also found; cod is taken with lines during the winter, and flounders, in 1834, were taken in such numbers that cart-loads were distributed throughout the neighbouring parishes.

The soil is generally a thin light loam, and, though warm and fertile, better adapted for pasture than for tillage; the chief crops are, oats and barley, with potatoes, turnips, and clover. The system of agriculture is improved, and much of the previously unprofitable waste land has been reclaimed. The cattle are principally of the Galloway breed; the sheep are the black-faced, and about fifty scores of that kind are pastured on the hills. The rateable annual value of the parish is £6006. On the estates of Fairgirth and Barnhourie, are considerable tracts of ancient wood; and the plantations of more modern date are also extensive, and consist chiefly of oak and Scotch fir, both of which are in a thriving state. The prevailing rocks are granite, of which there are quarries; stone of good quality for millstones is also raised, and there are evident indications of copper and iron, but no attempt has yet been made to work either of the veins. At the mouth of the river Urr small vessels are built, and there is a landing-place for unloading cargoes of lime and other articles, and for shipping the agricultural produce to Liverpool, Glasgow, and other ports. The ecclesiastical affairs of the parish are under the superintendence of the presbytery and synod of Dumfries. The minister's stipend is £234. 14. 6., with a manse, and a glebe valued at £20 per annum; joint patrons, the Crown and the Duke of Buccleuch. The church is a plain structure, erected in 1771, and totally inadequate to the population. There is a place of worship for members of the Secession Synod. Parochial schools are supported at Colvend and Southwick, of which the masters have each a salary of £26. 13.; the former has only fees averaging £15, and the latter has a house and garden, with fees amounting to £36. There are numerous caverns on the shore, in one of which, about 120 yards in length, is a well twenty-two feet deep, into which a piper is supposed to have fallen while attempting to explore the interior of the cavern; and near it is a detached portion of rock, formed naturally into an arch forty feet in height, called the Needle's Eye. In one of the clefts of the rocks, is a strong chalybeate spring; and at Auchenskeoch, in Southwick, are the remains of a large castellated building of which the history is unknown.

== Buildings ==
List of listed buildings in Colvend and Southwick, Dumfries and Galloway

== See also ==
- Auchenskeoch Castle
