= Kirkgunzeon =

Coordinates: 54°58′58″N 3°46′17″W

Kirkgunȝeon: Scottish Gaelic: Cill Fhionnain
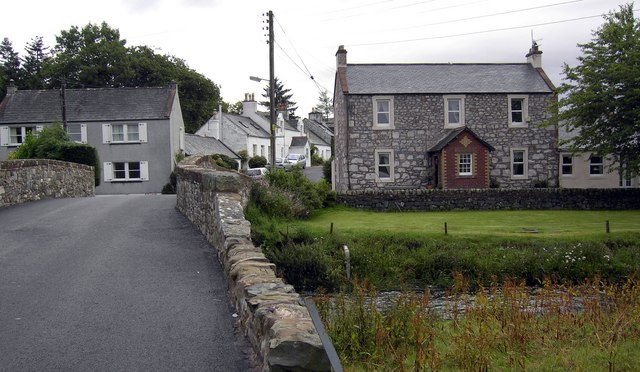
- Kirkgunzeon

- Location within Dumfries and Galloway
- OS grid reference: NX865666
- Council area: Dumfries and Galloway
- Lieutenancy area: Kirkcudbrightshire
- Country: Scotland
- Sovereign state: United Kingdom
- Post town: DUMFRIES
- Postcode district: DG2
- Police: Scotland
- Fire: Scottish
- Ambulance: Scottish
- UK Parliament: Dumfries and Galloway
- Scottish Parliament: Galloway and West Dumfries

Kirkgunȝeon (Scottish Gaelic: Cill Fhionnain) is a village and civil parish in Dumfries and Galloway, south west Scotland. The village is 10.4 miles (16.7 km) south west of Dumfries and 4.1 miles (6.6 km) north east of Dalbeattie. The civil parish is in the former county of Kirkcudbrightshire, and is bounded by the parishes Lochrutton to the north, Urr to the west, Colvend and Southwick to the south and New Abbey to the east.

== History ==
Oral history relates that a stone circle once existed in the parish, but that it disappeared due to stone removal between 1790 and 1870.

Early written references to Kirkgunzeon predominantly relate to land grants. Kirkgunzeon is recorded in c.1200 as Kirkwynnin. Wynnin represents a Cumbric form of the Gaelic Finnén, a diminutive of Findbarr. William J. Watson takes this to be Findbarr of Moyville. Thomas Clancy argues the name commemorates Uinniau a local British saint, not recorded in literary records.

The lands which would later become the parish were rented by Uchtred, Lord of Galloway to the monks of Holmcultram Abbey, a Cistercian monastery in Cumbria.

== Government ==
Kirkgunzeon Community Council is one of 23 community councils in the Stewartry district. The community council serves an estimated population of 319. The maximum number of voting members of the community council is 11.

Kirkgunzeon is in electoral ward 06 Abbey. It is part of the Dumfries and Galloway county constituency in the Parliament of the United Kingdom and part of the Galloway and West Dumfries constituency of the Scottish Parliament (Holyrood).

== Education ==
Kirkgunzeon Primary School serves the village and surrounding area as well as children from the district of Beeswing. The school is partnered with Colvend Primary School and Palnackie Primary School; these schools share a headteacher. Children from Kirkgunzeon attend Dalbeattie Primary School Nursery.

The present school building was built in 1964. It is a single storey building, with two classrooms. It has capacity for 47 pupils. The previous school building, now a dwelling, was on the other side of the river in the original village of Kirkgunzeon. It served pupils up to the statutory leaving age from the start of compulsory education in 1872 until 1945, after which it became a primary school.

The First Statistical Account of 1791-99 records one school and one school master in the parish. The Second Statistical Account, written in 1844, notes that there was also a school "at the lower end of the parish", built by the farmers at their own expense.

== Religious sites ==
Kirkgunzeon Parish Church held its final service on Sunday, 13 October 2013. The Church of Scotland congregations of Kirkgunzeon and Dalbeattie parishes were officially joined on Wednesday, 16 October 2013. Kirkgunzeon had previously been linked with Lochend and New Abbey church of Scotland on 24 June 2009. This link was severed on 25 September 2013.

On 4 August 2015 Dumfries and Galloway Council received an application to alter the church building to a dwelling.

== Cultural references ==
Kirkgunzeon railway station is mentioned briefly in Dorothy L. Sayers' novel The Five Red Herrings, which is set in Galloway.

== See also ==
- List of listed buildings in Kirkgunzeon
