= Kirkcudbrightshire =

Coordinates: 55°00′N 4°00′W

- Historic county
- Kirkcudbrightshire shown within Scotland

- Flag of Kirkcudbrightshire, registered in 2016
- Interactive map of Kirkcudbrightshire
- Country: Scotland
- County town: Kirkcudbright

Area
  - Total: 899 sq mi (2,328 km^{2})
- Ranked 10th of 34
- Chapman code: KKD

Kirkcudbrightshire (/kərˈkuːbriʃər/ kur-KOO-bree-shər), also known as the County of Kirkcudbright or the Stewartry of Kirkcudbright, is one of the historic counties of Scotland, located in the southwest of the country.

Until 1975, Kirkcudbrightshire functioned as an administrative county for local government purposes. Since then, its territory has formed part of the Dumfries and Galloway council area. The name continues to be used for certain ceremonial and legal purposes: it remains a registration county for land registration, and from 1975 to 1996 a lower-tier district known as the Stewartry covered most of the historic county. The same boundaries are still used today for the lieutenancy area of the Stewartry, and the Dumfries and Galloway Council maintains a Stewartry area committee.

Historically, Kirkcudbrightshire formed the eastern portion of the medieval Lordship of Galloway, which retained a measure of autonomy until its full incorporation into the Kingdom of Scotland during the 13th century. In 1369, the area east of the River Cree was placed under the jurisdiction of a steward based in Kirkcudbright, from which it derived the name "Stewartry of Kirkcudbright." The remainder of Galloway was administered by a sheriff seated in Wigtown, giving rise to the county of Wigtownshire. Kirkcudbrightshire was occasionally referred to as "East Galloway."

The county is bounded to the north by Ayrshire, to the west by Wigtownshire, to the south by the Irish Sea and the Solway Firth, and to the east by Dumfriesshire. Its county town is Kirkcudbright.

== History ==
=== Early history ===
The country west of the Nith was originally peopled by a tribe of Celts called Novantae, who long retained their independence.

After Gnaeus Julius Agricola's invasion in 79 AD, the country nominally formed part of the Roman province of Britannia, but the evidence is against there having been a prolonged effective Roman occupation. There was a Roman temporary marching camp at Shawhead, in Kirkpatrick Irongray.

After the retreat of the Romans, the fate of the Novantae is unknown. By the 6th century, Galloway was part of the Brythonic kingdom of Strathclyde.

During the ninth century, the region was part of the Kingdom of Northumbria. A hoard that has been attributed to either a Northumbrian metal-worker, or a Viking campaigner, was deposited near Talnotrie c.875-900.

=== 11th, 12th, and 13th centuries ===
During the next two hundred years the area was subject to incursions by Danes, Saxons and Scandinavians.

After Malcolm Canmore defeated and killed Macbeth in 1057, he married the dead king's relative, Ingibiorg, a Pictish princess, (the view that there were Picts in Galloway in historical times cannot be wholly rejected) an event which marked the beginning of the decay of Norse influence. The Galloway chiefs became lieges of the Scottish king, while retaining some independence as the sub-kingdom or semi-autonomous Lordship of Galloway. Following the death of Lord Alan of Galloway in 1234 the area was brought fully under the control of the Scottish crown.

=== 14th and 15th centuries ===
In 1308 the district was cleared of the English and brought under allegiance to the king, when the lordship of Galloway was given to Edward Bruce.

In 1369 Archibald the Grim, Earl of Douglas, was given the part of Galloway east of the River Cree, where he appointed a steward to administer the area, which became known as the Stewartry of Kirkcudbright. The following year, he acquired the rest of Galloway west of the Cree, which continued to be administered by the king's sheriff, and so became known as the Shire of Wigtown. This led to the local custom of referring to Kirkcudbrightshire as "The Stewartry" and Wigtownshire as "The Shire", which continued into the 20th century.

In 1455 Threave Castle, the most important fortress in Galloway, which Archibald the Grim had built on the Dee immediately to the west of the modern town of Castle Douglas, was reduced and converted into a royal keep.

=== 16th and 17th centuries ===
As the Douglases went down the Maxwells rose, and the debatable land on the south-east of Dumfriesshire was for generations the scene of strife and raid, not only between the two nations but also among the leading families, of whom the Maxwells, Johnstones and Armstrongs were always conspicuous. After the Battle of Solway Moss (1542) the shires of Kirkcudbright and Dumfries fell under English rule for a short period. The treaty of Norham (24 March 1550) established a truce between the nations for ten years; and in 1552, the Wardens of the Marches consenting, the debatable land ceased to be matter for debate, the parish of Canonbie being annexed to Dumfriesshire, that of Kirkandrews to Cumberland.

=== 18th century ===
McCulloch and Gordon families were of Cardoness Castle, Anwoth Parish and Rev. Rutherford was minister of Anwoth.

After the union (1707) things mended slowly but surely, curious evidence of growing commercial prosperity being the enormous extent to which smuggling was carried on. No coast could serve the "free traders" better than the shores of Kirkcudbright, and the contraband trade flourished until the 19th century. The Jacobite risings of 1715 and 1745 elicited small sympathy from the inhabitants of the shire. In the 1760s a military road was constructed from Bridge of Sark, near Gretna, Dumfries and Galloway to Portpatrick by Major William Caulfeild.

=== 19th century ===
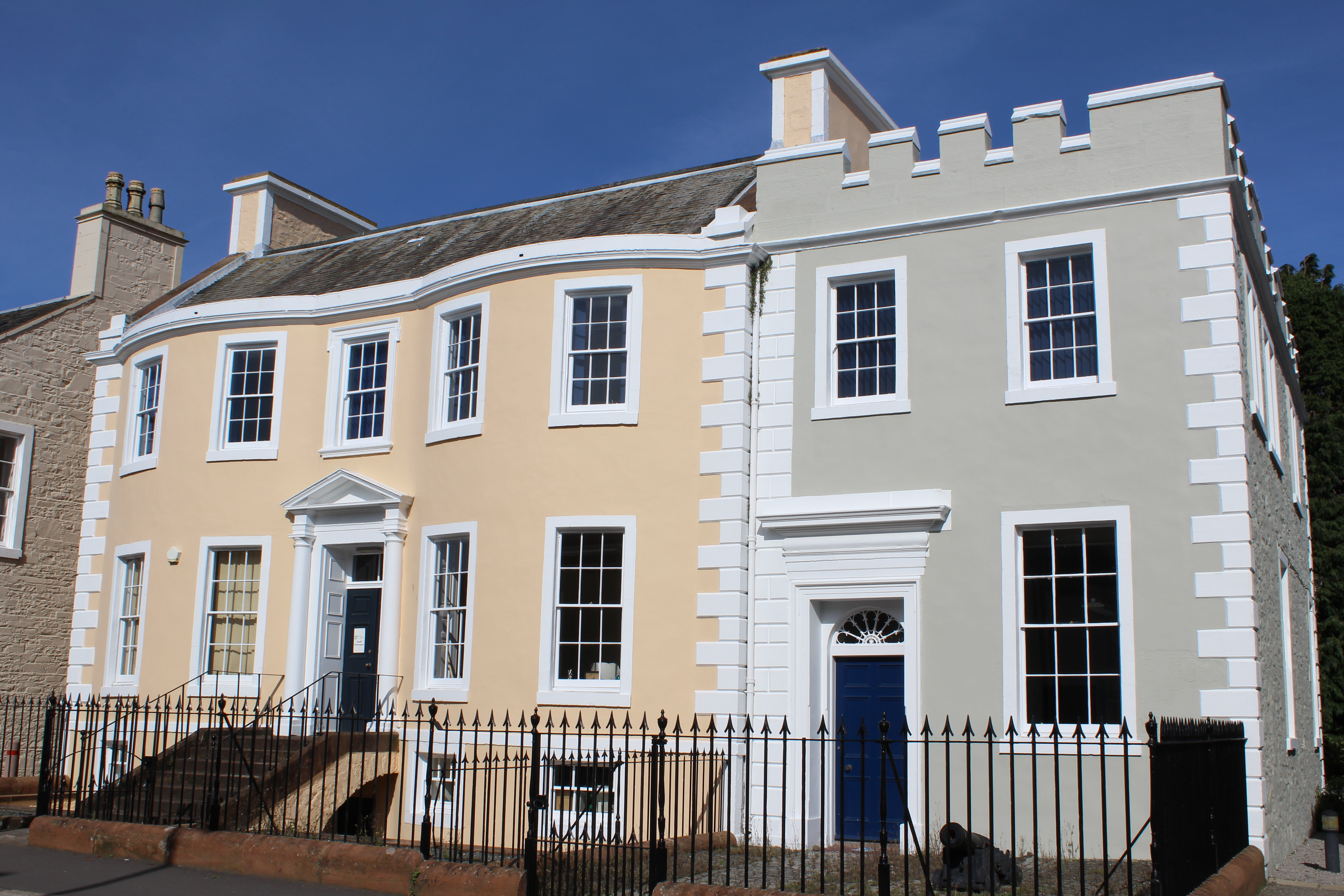
121–123 High Street, Kirkcudbright: Former headquarters of Kirkcudbrightshire County Council

Elected county councils were established in Scotland in 1890 under the Local Government (Scotland) Act 1889. Kirkcudbrightshire County Council established its headquarters at County Buildings, 121–123 High Street, Kirkcudbright, being a converted pair of late 18th-century houses. A large extension was built in 1952 to the rear of the building facing Daar Road.

Kirkcudbrightshire was abolished as an administrative county in 1975 under the Local Government (Scotland) Act 1973. A two-tier system of regions and districts was put in place instead, with the area becoming part of the Dumfries and Galloway region. Most of Kirkudbrightshire became part of the Stewartry district. The two parishes of Kirkmabreck and Minnigaff in the west of the county went instead to the Wigtown district, while the five parishes of Kirkbean, Kirkpatrick Irongray, New Abbey, Terregles, and Troqueer in the east of the county went to the Nithsdale district.

Further local government reform in 1996 saw the Stewartry, Wigtown and Nithsdale districts abolished and their functions passed to Dumfries and Galloway Council, which continues to operate area committees based on the pre-1996 districts, subject to some boundary changes where ward boundaries no longer follow the pre-1996 district boundaries. The former Stewartry district is used as a lieutenancy area under the name the Stewartry of Kirkcudbright.

== Geography ==
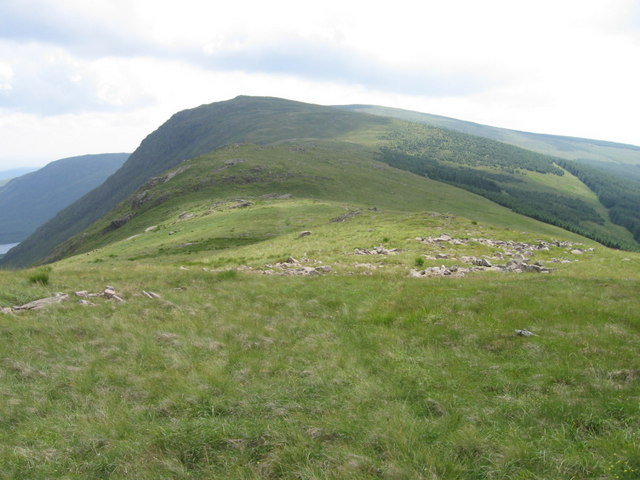
Rhinns of Kells ridge towards Millfire

Kirkcudbrightshire has a shoreline on the Solway Firth, between the rivers Nith and Cree. Inland, the area has many hills, with its highest point being Merrick 843 metres (2,766 ft).

There are many "burns" and "waters", but their length seldom exceeds 7 or 8 miles (11 or 13 kilometres). Among the longer rivers are the Cree, which rises in Loch Moan and reaches the sea near Creetown after a course of about 30 miles (50 kilometres); the Dee or Black Water of Dee (so named from the peat by which it is coloured), which rises in Loch Dee which after a course mainly S.E. and finally S., enters the sea at St Mary's Isle below Kirkcudbright, its length being nearly 36 miles (58 kilometres); the Urr, rising in Loch Urr on the Dumfriesshire border, falls into the sea a few miles south of Dalbeattie 27 miles (43 kilometres) from its source.

=== Geology ===
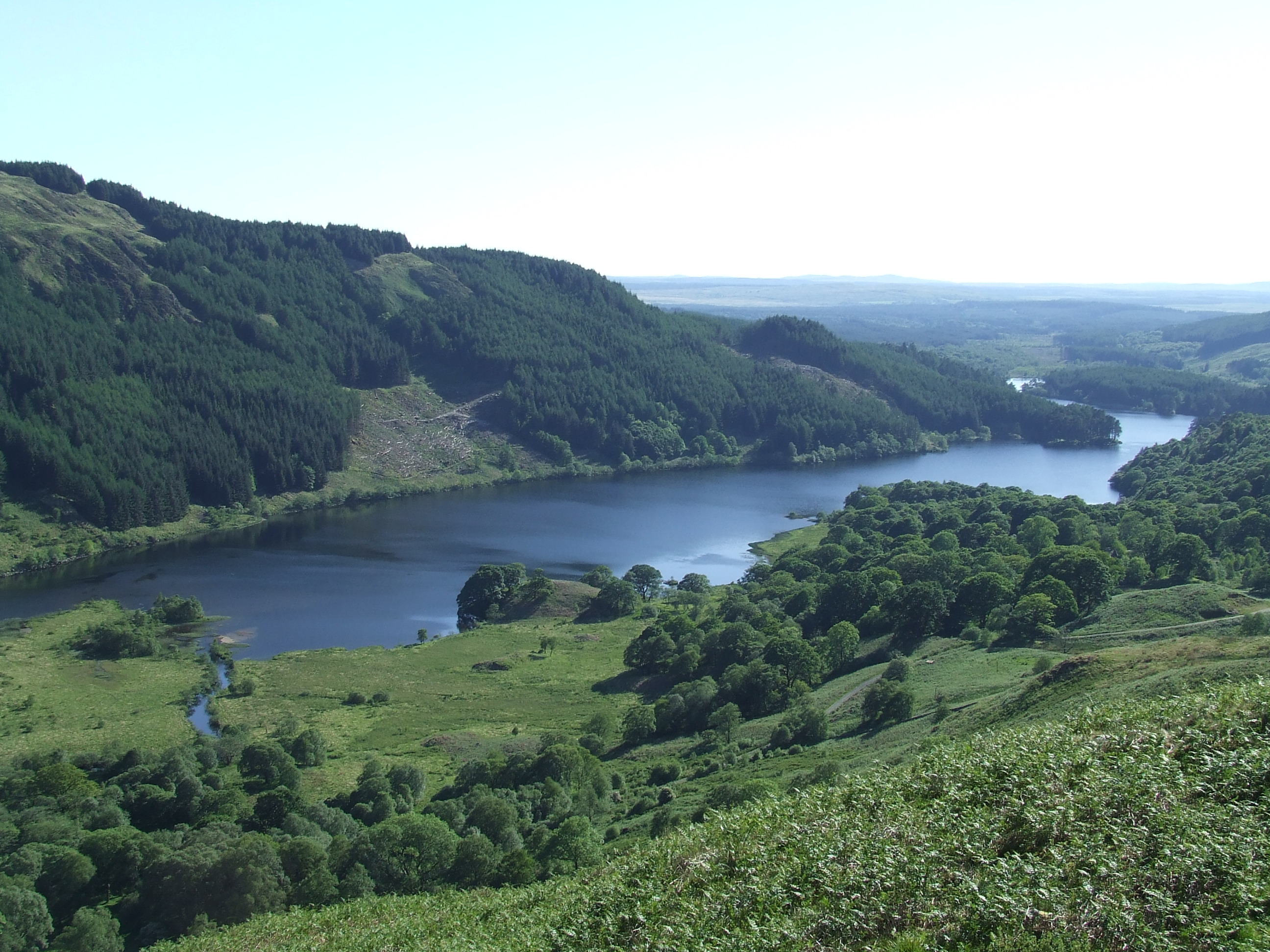
Loch Trool in north-western Kirkcudbrightshire

Silurian and Ordovician rocks are the most important in this county; they are thrown into oft-repeated folds with their axes lying in a north-east–south-west direction. The Ordovician rocks are graptolitic black shales and grits of Llandeilo and Caradoc age. They occupy all the northern part of the county north-west of a line which runs some 3 m. north of New Galloway and just south of the Rinns of Kells. South-east of this line graptolitic Silurian shales of Llandovery age prevail; they are found around Dalry, Creetown, New Galloway, Castle Douglas and Kirkcudbright.

Overlying the Llandovery beds on the south coast are strips of Wenlock rocks; they extend from Bridgehouse Bay to Auchinleck and are well exposed in Kirkcudbright Bay, and they can be traced farther round the coast between the granite and the younger rocks. Carboniferous rocks appear in small faulted tracts, unconformable on the Silurian, on the shores of the Solway Firth. They are best developed about Kirkbean, where they include a basal red breccia followed by conglomerates, grits and cement stones of Calciferous Sandstone age.

Brick-red sandstones of Permian age just come within the county on the W. side of the Nith at Dumfries. Volcanic necks occur in the Permian and basalt dikes penetrate the Silurian at Borgue, Kirkandrews, etc.

Most of the highest ground is formed by granite plutons which have been intruded into the Ordovician and Silurian rocks; the Criffel pluton lies about Dalbeattie and Bengairn, another mass extends east and west between the Cairnsmore of Fleet and Loch Ken, another lies north-west and south-east between Loch Doon and Loch Dee and a small mass forms the Cairnsmore of Carsphairn. Much granite was quarried from Kirkmabreck, near Creetown for dock construction from 1830 on.

Glacial deposits occupy much of the low ground; the ice, having travelled in a southerly or south-easterly direction, has left abundant striae on the higher ground to indicate its course. Radiation of the ice streams took place from the heights of Merrick, Kells, etc.; local moraines are found near Carsphairn and in the Deagh and Minnoch valleys. Glacial drumlins of boulder clay lie in the vales of the Dee, Cree and Urr.

=== Climate and agriculture ===
The climate and soil suit grass and green crops rather than grain. The annual rainfall averages 1,160 millimetres (45.7 in). The mean temperature for the year is 9 °C (48 °F); for January 4 °C (39 °F)and 15 °C (59 °F) for July.

== Railways ==
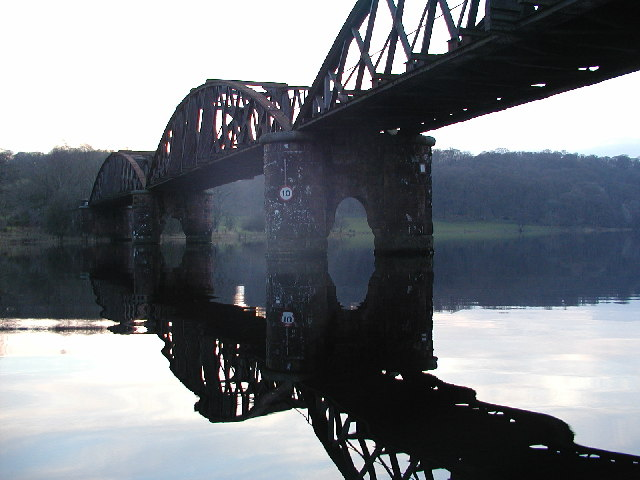
Railway viaduct at Loch Ken, now disused

Castle Douglas and Dumfries Railway was incorporated on 21 July 1856; the act was obtained by the Glasgow and South Western Railway. It opened on 7 November 1859 and was substantially closed, under the Beeching cuts, on 14 June 1965. The Portpatrick Railway was authorised on 10 August 1857. By 12 March 1861, the line connected Stranraer to Castle Douglas, where it joined the newly constructed Castle Douglas and Dumfries railway. The branch to Portpatrick opened the following year, on 28 August 1862, with the Stranraer Harbour branch, which opened on 1 October 1862; although building work continued on the line for another five years. The Kirkcudbright Railway was a railway branch line linking Kirkcudbright to the Castle Douglas and Dumfries Railway at Castle Douglas. It opened in 1864, and closed in 1965.

The Beeching cuts cut off the Castle Douglas and Dumfries Railway and Portpatrick Railway in 1965 resulting in an adverse mileage increase via the Glasgow South Western Line to reach Stranraer Harbour (for Larne Harbour and Port of Belfast) from Dumfries, Carlisle and the West Coast Main Line to London Euston, and leaving the county without any railway permanent way.

== List of parishes ==
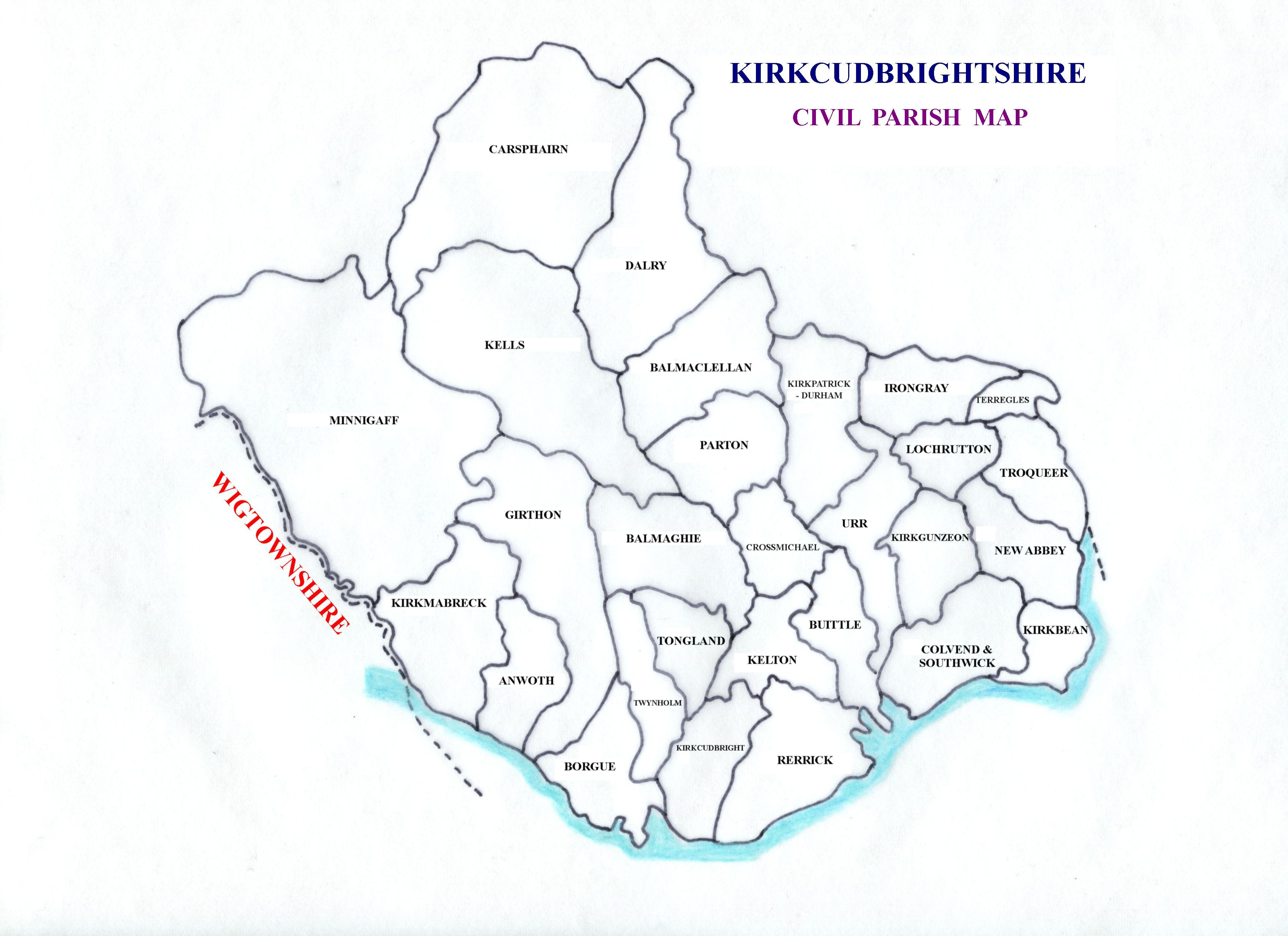
Kirkcudbrightshire, Civil Parish map

The Stewartry is composed of the following 28 civil parishes.

- Anwoth
- Balmaclellan
- Balmaghie
- Borgue
- Buittle
- Carsphairn
- Colvend and Southwick
- Crossmichael
- Dalry
- Girthon, see also Gatehouse of Fleet and Cally Palace
- Kells
- Kelton
- Kirkbean
- Kirkcudbright
- Kirkgunzeon
- Kirkmabreck
- Kirkpatrick Durham
- Kirpatrick Irongray (or Irongray)
- Lochrutton
- Minnigaff
- New Abbey
- Parton
- Rerrick
- Terregles
- Tongland
- Troqueer
- Twynholm
- Urr

== Towns and villages ==
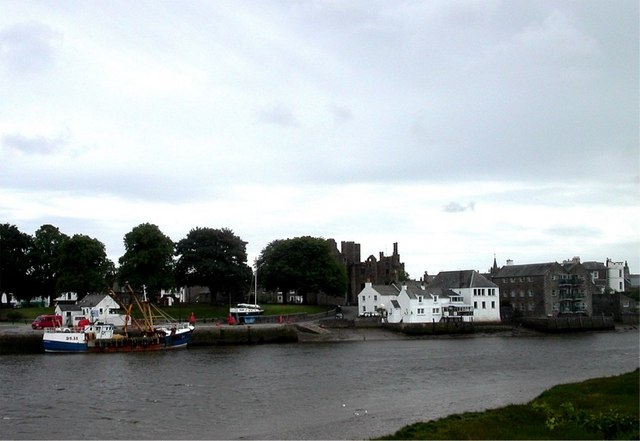
Kirkcudbright

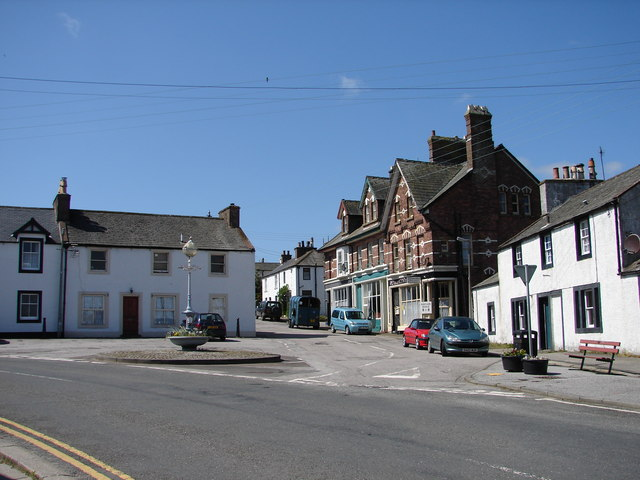
Auchencairn

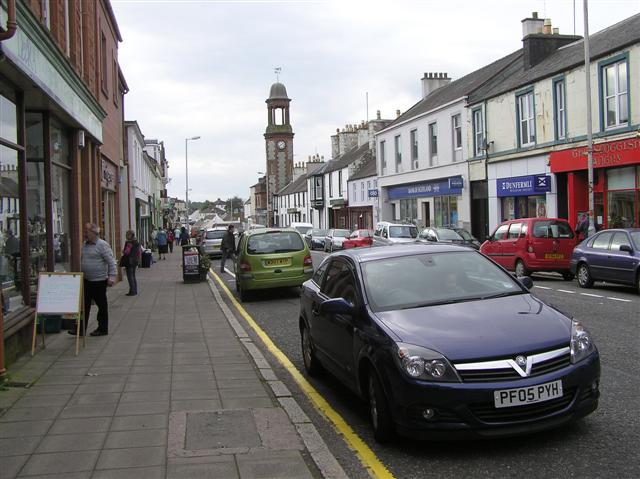
Castle Douglas

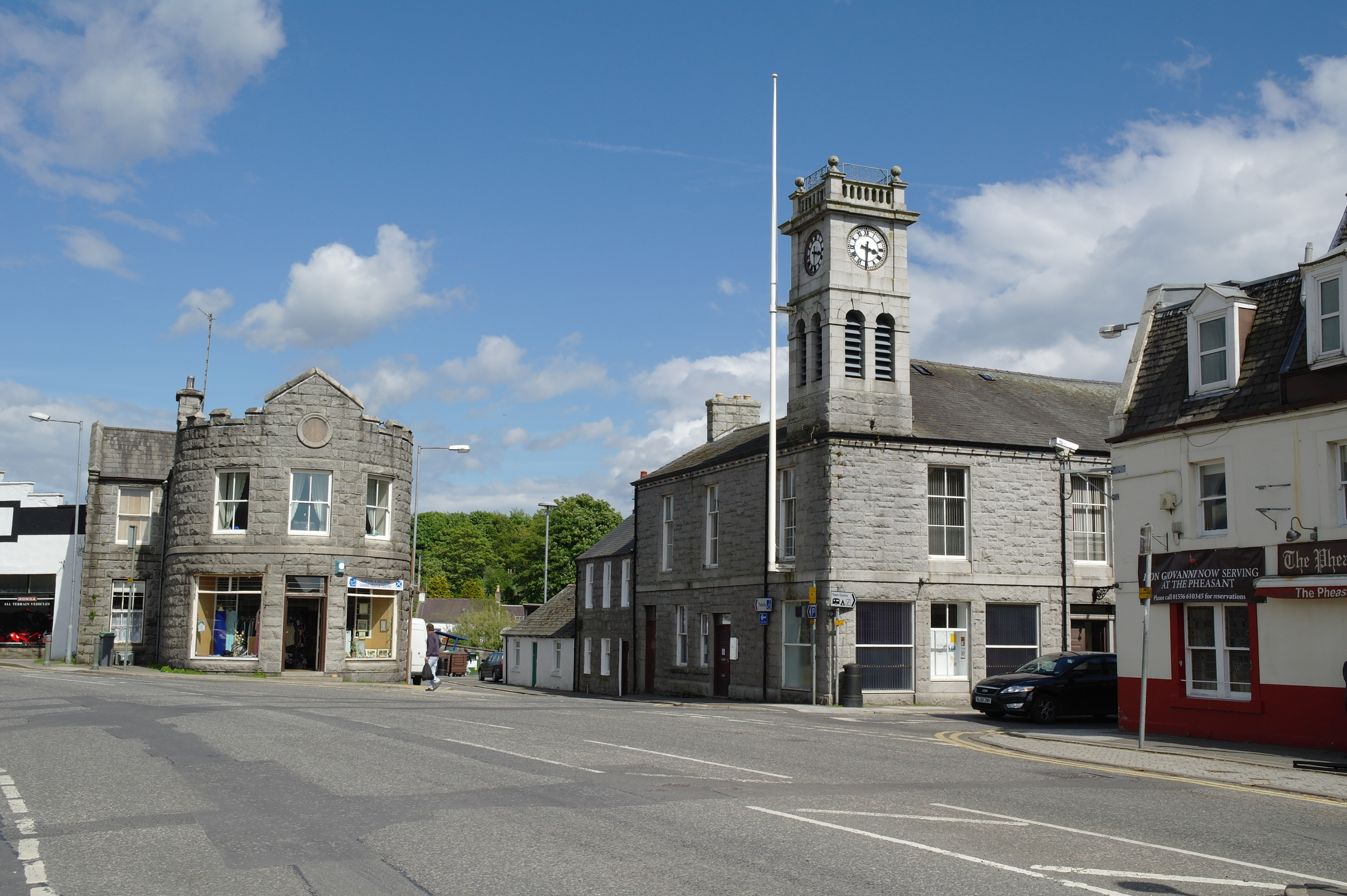
Dalbeattie

- Auchencairn
- Balmaclellan
- Beeswing
- Borgue
- Bridge of Dee
- Cargenbridge
- Carsethorn
- Carsphairn
- Castle Douglas
- Colvend
- Corsock
- Creetown
- Crocketford
- Crossmichael
- Dalbeattie
- Gatehouse of Fleet
- Hardgate
- Haugh of Urr
- Ingleston
- Kirkcudbright
- Kirkgunzeon
- Kirkpatrick Durham
- Kippford
- Laurieston
- Maxwelltown (the largest burgh in the Stewartry, on the western side of Dumfries over the River Nith, was transferred in 1930 to Dumfriesshire, and is now a suburb of the town of Dumfries)
- Minnigaff
- New Abbey
- New Galloway
- Palnackie
- Rascarrel
- Ringford
- Rockcliffe
- St. John's Town of Dalry
- Sandyhills
- Shawhead
- Springholm
- Terregles
- Tongland
- Twynholm

== Gallery ==
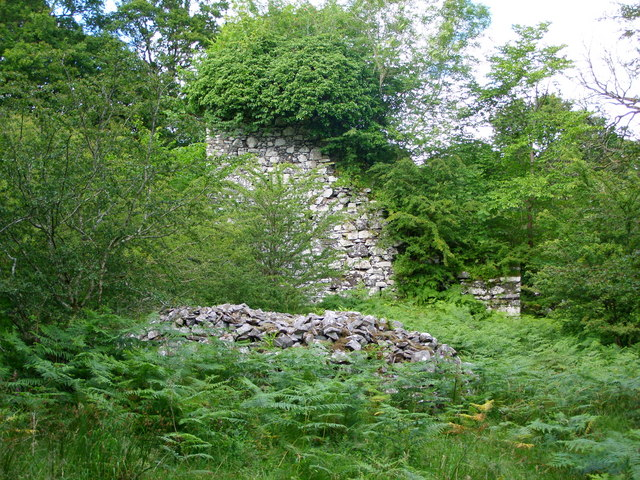
Garlies Castle.

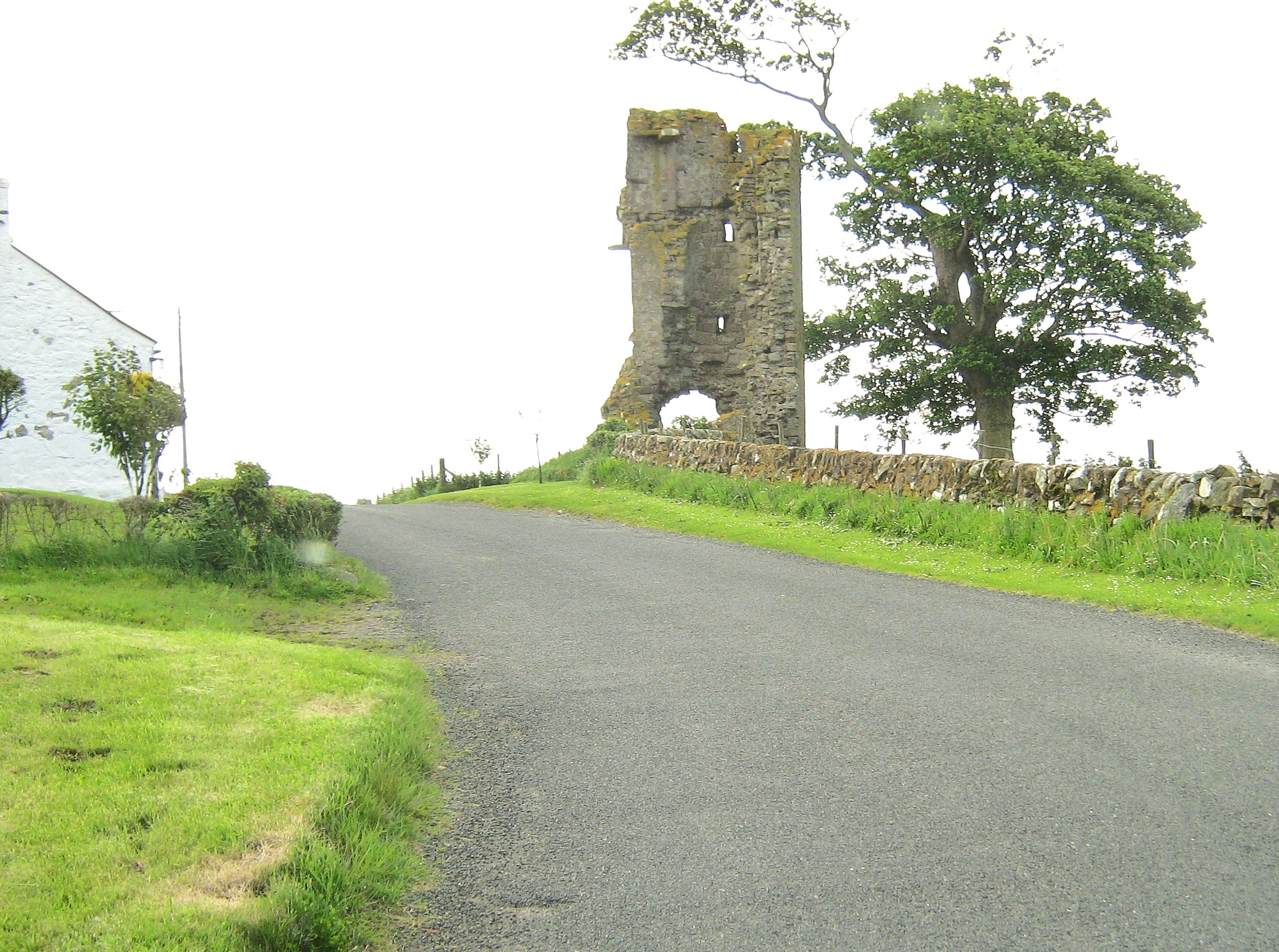
Wreaths Tower, Kirkbean.

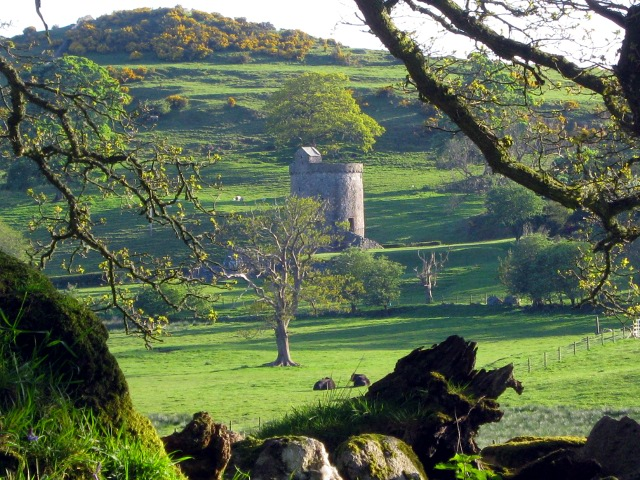
Orchardtown Tower, Buittle.

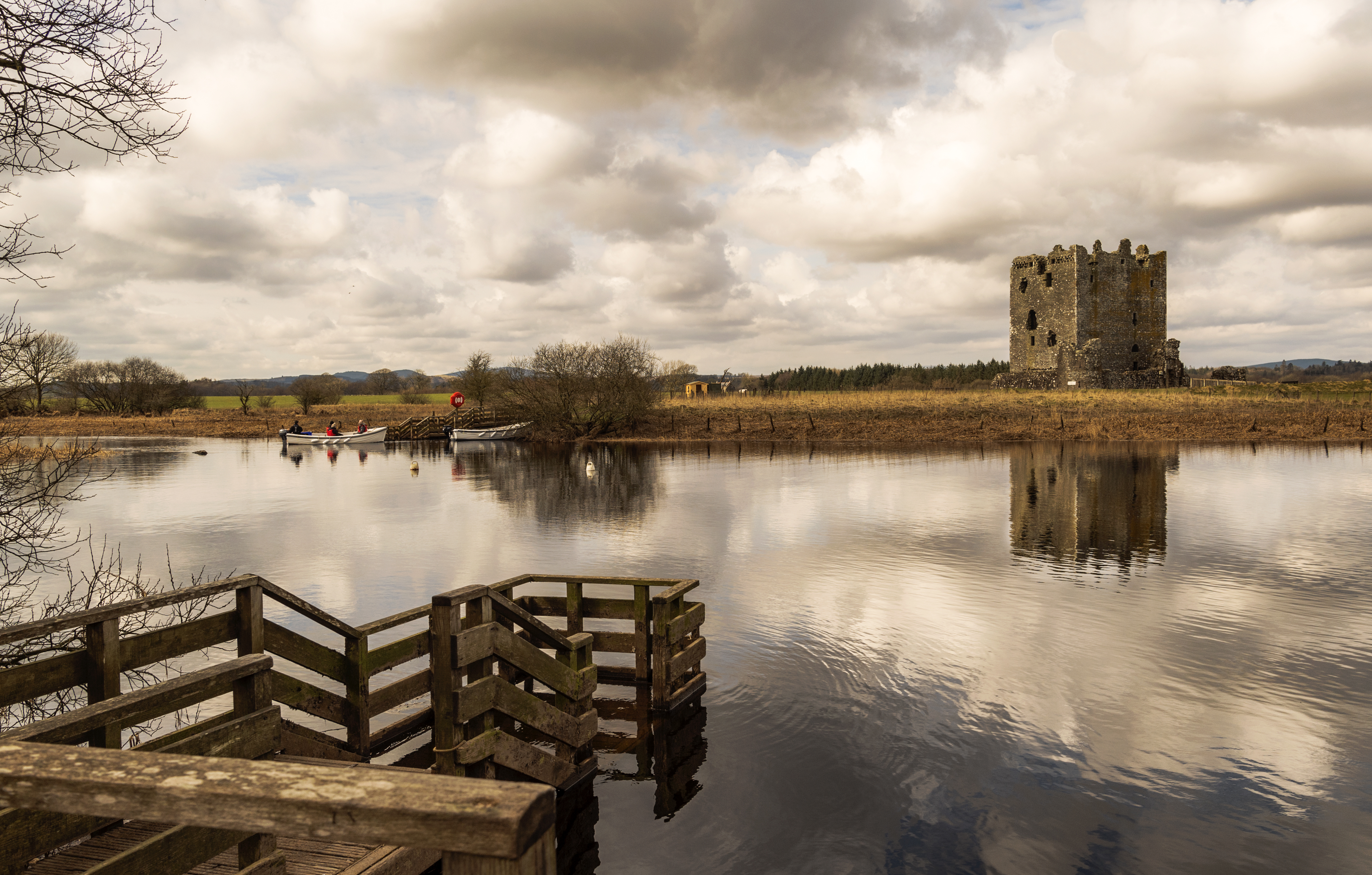
Threave Castle

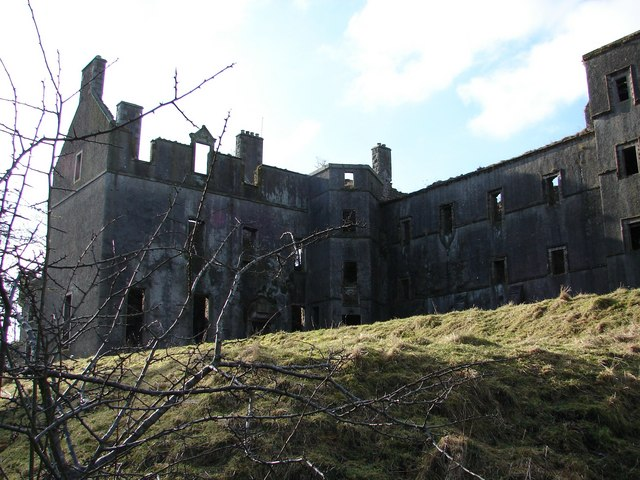
Kenmure Castle, Kells parish.

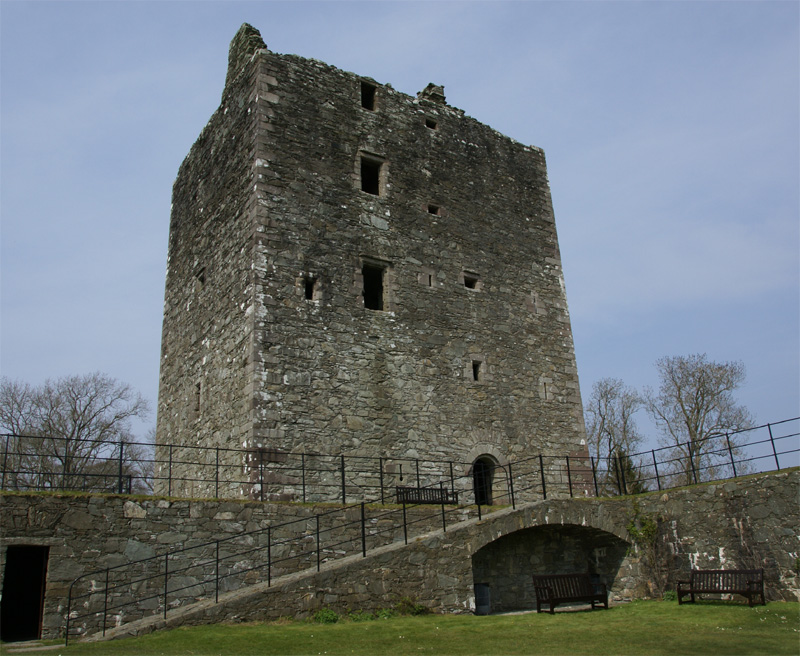
Cardoness Castle.

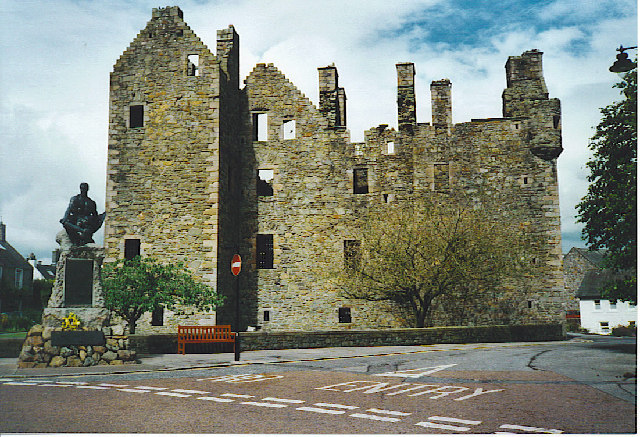
MacLellan's Castle at Kirkcudbright.

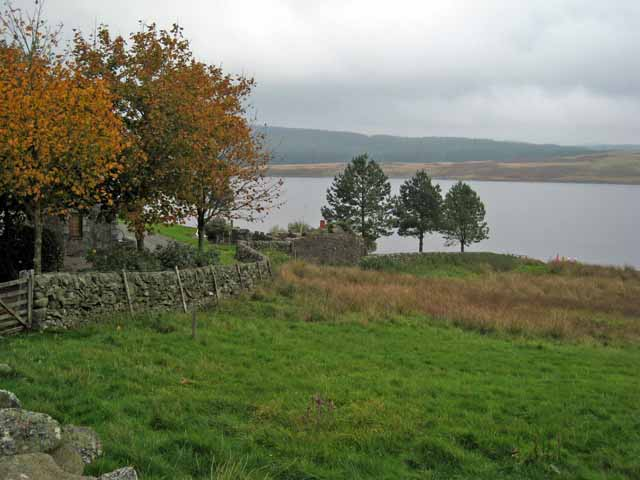
Lochinvar Castle site.

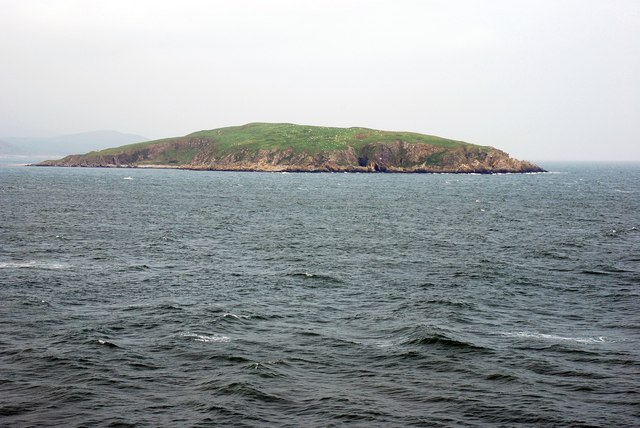
Hestan Island

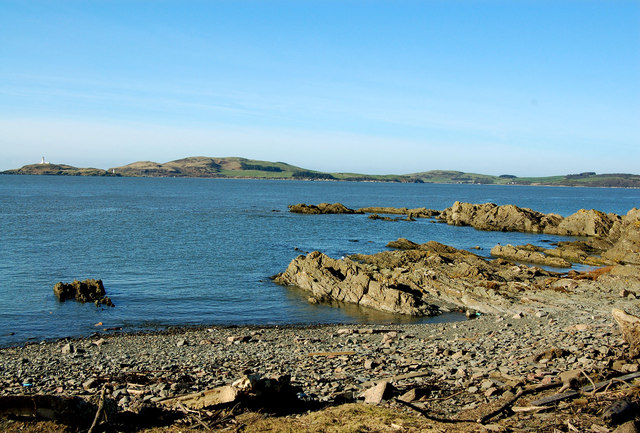
Gypsy Point looking over to Little Ross

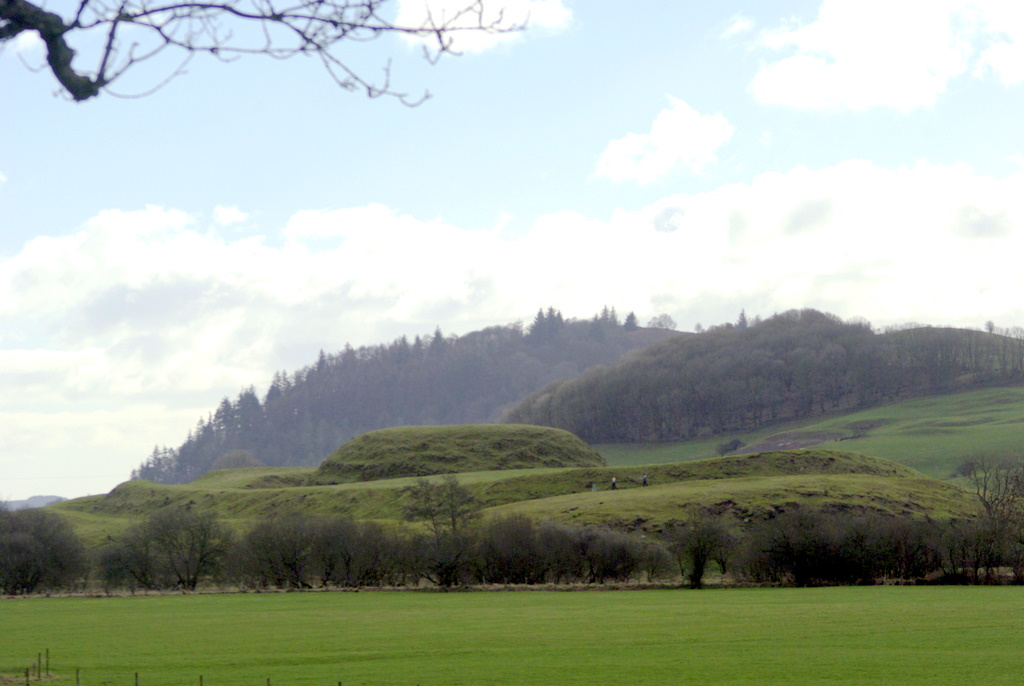
Motte of Urr

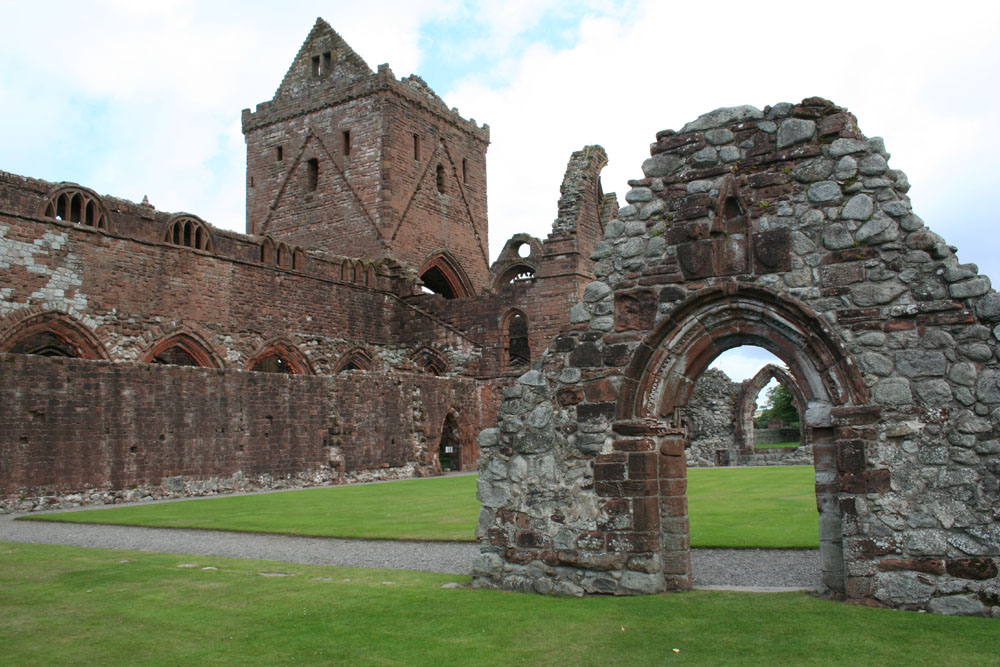
Remains of Sweetheart Abbey

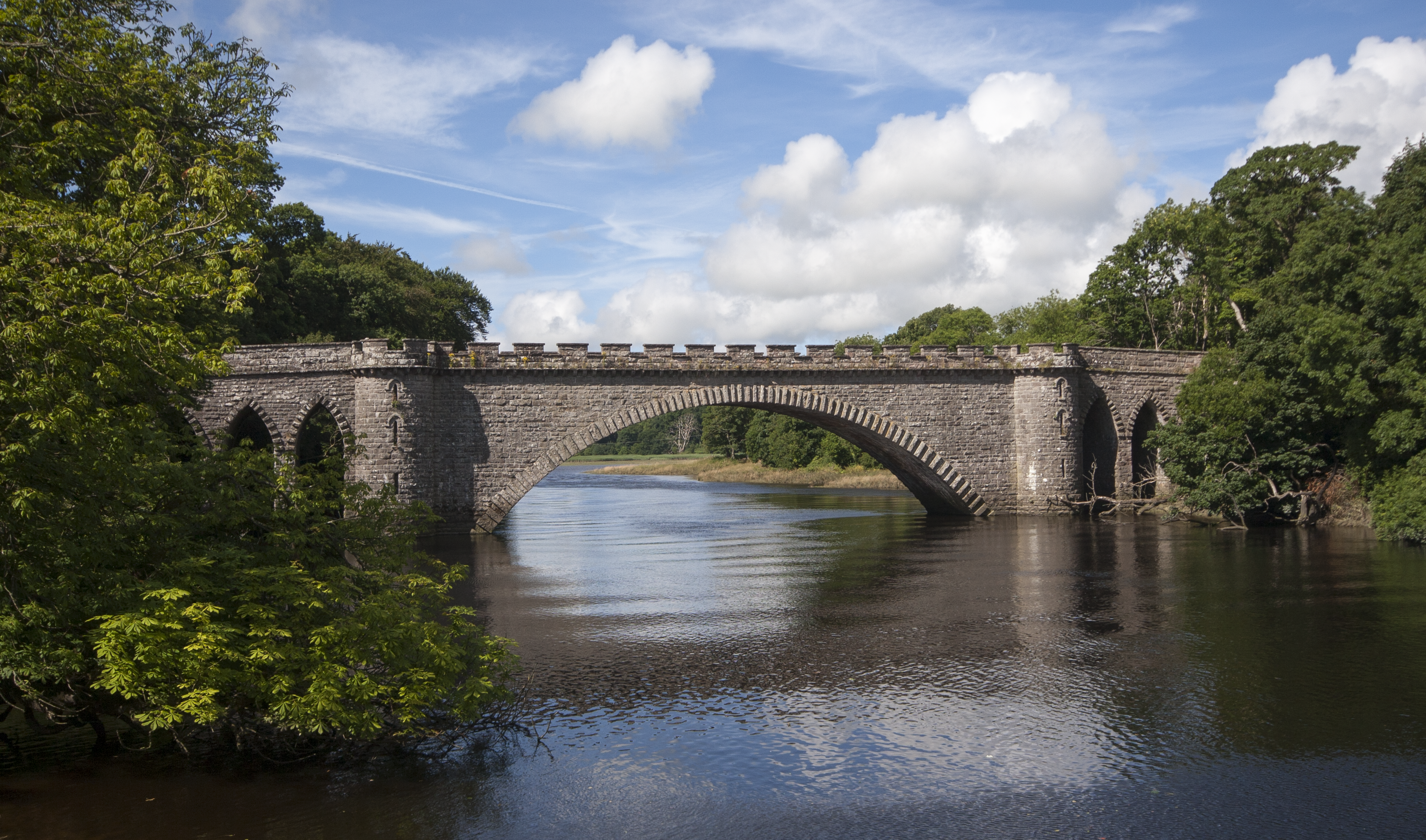
Bridge over the Dee at Tongland

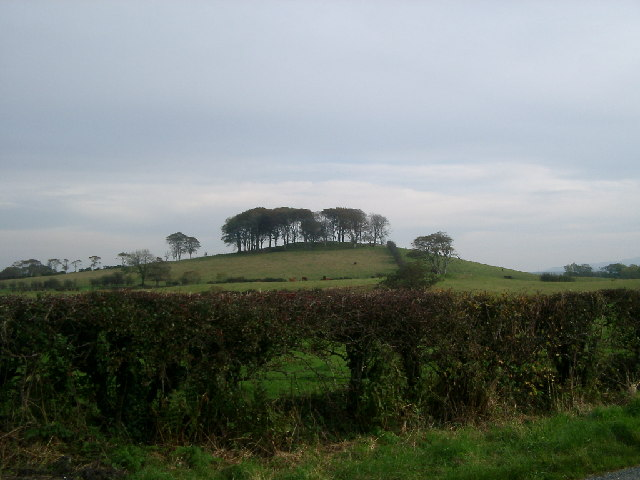
Hillfort near Twynholm

== Notable Inhabitants ==
- Alan of Galloway, Lord of Galloway and Constable of Scotland
- Archibald the Grim, Lord of Galloway and Earl of Douglas
- Malcolm Caldwell, Marxist writer, chair of the Campaign for Nuclear Disarmament
- James Clerk Maxwell, 19th-century physicist
- David Coulthard, Formula 1 Grand Prix winner from Twynholm
- S. R. Crockett, Minister and novelist
- Devorguilla, Mother of John I, king of Scotland
- Sir William Douglas, Founded the town of Castle Douglas
- Campbell Cowan Edgar, Egyptologist and Secretary-General of the Egyptian Museum in Cairo
- E A Hornel, Painter born in Australia
- John Paul Jones, Scots born American and Russian naval commander
- Janice Maxwell, Lawn Bowler - Scottish and World Championships winner, Commonwealth Games Bronze Medal winner.
- Margaret McNaughton, Scottish Canadian writer
- Alexander Murray, Edinburgh University professor
- John Welsh of Irongray, leader of the Scottish Covenanter Movement
