= Castle Douglas and Dumfries Railway =

Former railway line in Scotland

Overview
- Locale: Scotland
- Dates of operation: 7 November 1859–14 June 1965
- Successor: Glasgow and South Western Railway

Technical
- Track gauge: 4 ft 8 1/2 in (1,435 mm)

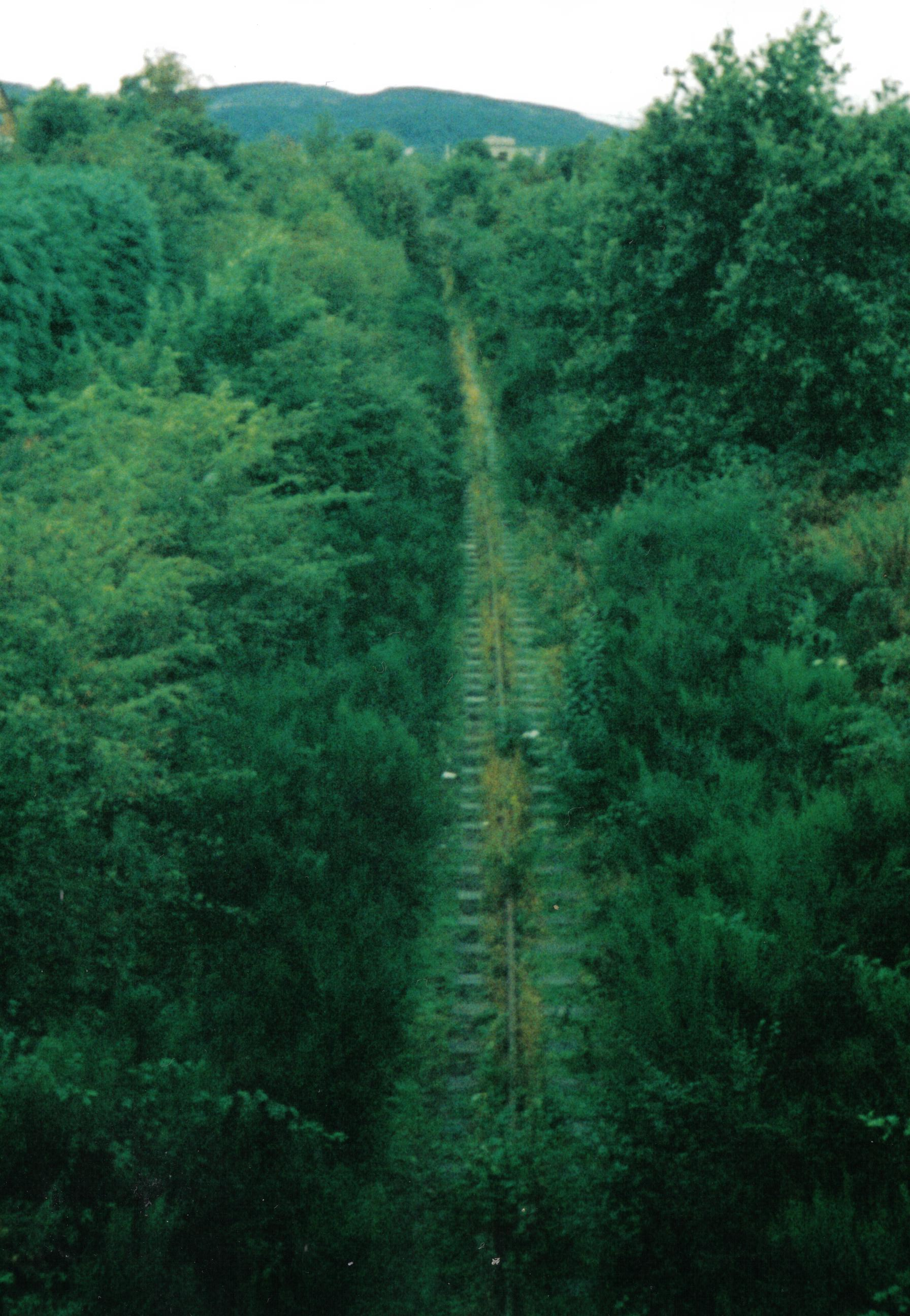
The old railway from Dumfries to Stranraer just outside Dumfries (2005)

The Castle Douglas and Dumfries Railway was a railway in Galloway in the south west of Scotland which linked Castle Douglas in Kirkcudbrightshire to Dumfries.

It opened in 1859. Other companies' lines extended westwards and southwards, and the CD&D line formed a key link in opening up the agricultural area of south-west Scotland. When Stranraer and Portpatrick were reached by the contiguous lines, the CD&D line was the eastern section of the Port Road, which provided an important route from English originating points to Northern Ireland by ferry between Portpatrick and Donaghadee. Much later the ferry route was from Stranraer to Larne.

The CD&DR was absorbed by the larger Glasgow and South Western Railway in 1865.

The line was one of the 1965 Beeching closures, except for a stub from Dumfries to Cargenbridge Imperial Chemical Industries which continued until 1994, although it was dormant in the latter years. Nothing now remains of the rail activity on the line.

== History ==
=== Authorisation and construction ===
In the middle of the nineteenth century the counties of Galloway, Wigtownshire and Kirkcudbrightshire (Note: Now all part of the administrative Region of Dumfries and Galloway.) were devoted to agriculture, but lacked efficient land communications links with the rest of the United Kingdom. Mail from the northern part of England, and Scotland, to Ireland passed this way through the ports of Portpatrick and Donaghadee, but the poor roads made the passage difficult.

The Glasgow, Dumfries and Carlisle Railway (GD&CR) was authorised in 1846 and the authorisation appears to have included a branch from Dumfries to Kirkcudbright, but the shortage of money at that time led to abandonment of the plans for the branch.

The opening of the Chester and Holyhead Railway in 1850 induced the Post Office to transfer the mail to that route. (Note: The transfer was done in September 1849, at which stage the Holyhead line had been opened as far as Bangor.) In the same year the GD&CR merged with other lines to form the Glasgow and South Western Railway (G&SWR). The directors of the G&SWR sought to open up the area, with a view to regaining the mail traffic in due course. The G&SWR also wished to forestall any incursion into the area by the rival Caledonian Railway.

Castle Douglas and Dumfries Railway Act 1856
- Act of Parliament
- Parliament of the United Kingdom
- Long title: An Act for making a Railway from Castle Douglas, by Dalbeattie, to the Glasgow and South-western Railway at Dumfries, and for other Purposes.
- Citation: 19 & 20 Vict. c. cxiv

Dates
- Royal assent: 21 July 1856

Text of statute as originally enacted

The G&SWR line passed through Dumfries on its route from Carlisle to Glasgow, and the company had a line from Glasgow to Ayr. Both points were a considerable distance from Portpatrick, and when local interests promoted a railway connecting Castle Douglas to Dumfries, the G&SWR encouraged the scheme, seeing it as a first step in its plans. The G&SWR encouragement took tangible form in a subscription of £60,000, which was half of the proposed capital of the scheme. Local interests found the remainder, and a bill was presented to Parliament; it attracted little opposition and the Castle Douglas and Dumfries Railway Act 1856 (19 & 20 Vict. c. cxiv) authorising the Castle Douglas and Dumfries Railway was passed on 21 July 1856. (Note: Awdry states on page 66 that the act was "obtained" by the G&SWR but this must be a misunderstanding of the earlier abortive GD&CR branch proposal. The Castle Douglas Company was nominally independent, and its shareholding and directors are recited in contemporary accounts.) The line was to be a little over 19 miles (31 km) long.

Castle Douglas and Dumfries Railway (Amendment) Act 1859
- Act of Parliament
- Parliament of the United Kingdom
- Long title: An Act to authorize the raising of a further Sum of Money for the Completion of the Castle Douglas and Dumfries Railway, and to sanction a Deviation from the authorized Line of that Railway.
- Citation: 22 & 23 Vict. c. xxix

Dates
- Royal assent: 21 July 1859

Construction proceeded quickly, but the authorised capital proved insufficient for completion, and an additional £24,000 in 6% preference shares was authorised by the Castle Douglas and Dumfries Railway (Amendment) Act 1859 (22 & 23 Vict. c. xxix); the G&SWR subscribed all of the additional capital, becoming the majority shareholder.

=== Opening ===
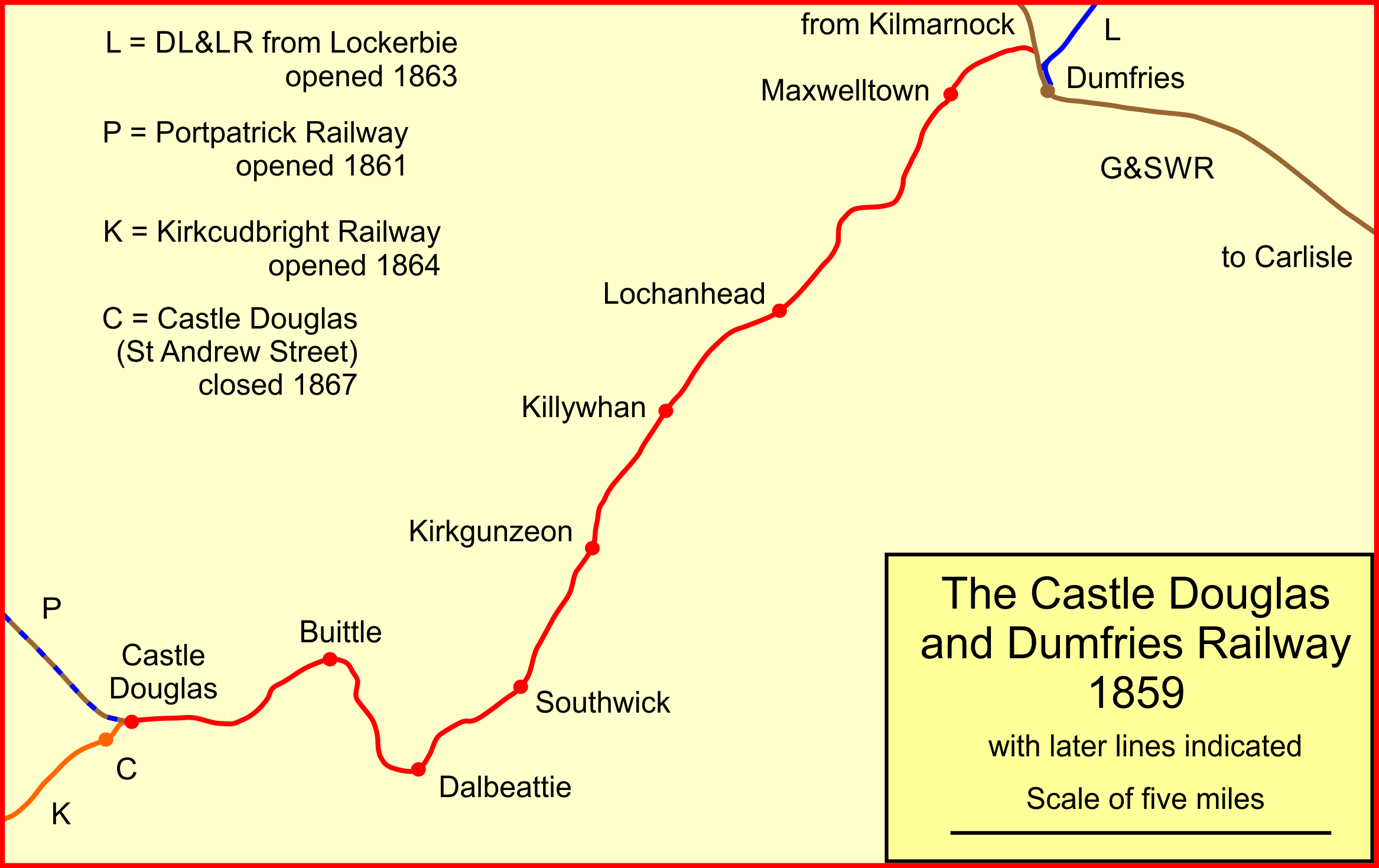
The CD&DR system at opening, with important (later) lines shown

The line opened on 7 November 1859 and was immediately commercially successful; the preference share dividend was paid in full and sufficient surplus enabled a 1% dividend to be paid on ordinary shares in the first full year. The line was operated from the outset by the G&SWR.

In 1861 the Portpatrick Railway completed a connection from Castle Douglas to Stranraer and Portpatrick, and through traffic ran from Carlisle and points south and east over the CD&DR line.

The Castle Douglas and Dumfries Railway was amalgamated with the Glasgow and South Western Railway on 1 August 1865, by the terms of the Glasgow and South-western Railway (Amalgamations) Act 1865 (28 & 29 Vict. c. ccxcviii) of 5 July 1865.

In the twentieth century the amalgamated G&SWR formed part of the London, Midland and Scottish Railway in the 1923 grouping of the railways.

The Caledonian Railway gained running powers over the line between Dumfries and Castle Douglas, which allowed it access to Portpatrick, Stranraer and Stranraer harbour over a jointly owned line, the Portpatrick and Wigtownshire Joint Railway. These running rights allowed the Caledonian Railway to run Irish boat trains from Carlisle and south of the border, considerably shortening the former longer route though Ayrshire.

=== Closure ===
The line was substantially closed, under the Beeching Axe, on 14 June 1965. The section between Maxwelltown and Dumfries remained open to serve an oil depot, but this section of line has now been lifted and is a cycleway/footpath.

== Dalbeattie accident, 1874 ==
There was a collision on the single line in 1874. In Tales of the Glasgow and South Western Railway, Smith records that

All west of Lochanhead was single line then. A G.&S.W. ballast train had the staff and was working in the section to Castle Douglas. A westbound Caledonian goods was given a ticket, and about a mile west of Dalbeattie met the ballast [train] returning. Three of the enginemen were killed. Of course, staff and ticket working was absolutely foolproof. The tickets were in a locked box, openable only by the key on the end of the staff. But then, nobody ever used the key on the end of the staff; the point of the standard office poker fitted the lock exactly. (Note: Under the Train Staff and Ticket system of working single lines, possession of the train staff (a physical object marked with the stations between which it was valid) was a guarantee that no train would approach in the opposing direction. If two trains were required to run in succession in the same direction, the driver of the first train must be shown the train staff and given a written ticket as authority to proceed. As the train staff was then left behind, there could be no head-on collision. If Smith's narrative is correct, the personnel at Dalbeattie issued the ticket recklessly, and the driver of the Caledonian goods train failed to insist on seeing the train staff, which should have been his guarantee.)

Smith amplifies the detail in his The Little Railways of South-West Scotland:

The goods train was the 11.30 am from Dumfries to Stranraer; Driver John Robb received a ticket at Lochanhead; asked if he had seen the staff "he could not remember clearly". At Kirkgunzeon he received a ticket again, and was not shown the staff. At Dalbeattie he went through the station slowly and William Douglas, a 16-year-old goods clerk, handed Robb a ticket; Robb said that he asked him, "Is that all right?" and Douglas replied, "Yes, go on."

Douglas later said that he knew nothing of the ballast train, but when the goods train arrived, he found the book of tickets lying open on the desk; he wrote out the ticket and gave it to Robb.

The ballast train was returning to Dalbeattie, running down a gradient of 1 in 100 with little forward visibility. The collision was inevitable; both engine drivers died.

== Topography ==
The line left Dumfries station curving immediately westwards and south-westwards, through difficult terrain.

As built the line was single, but it was doubled throughout

Stations were at

- Maxwelltown (closed 1 March 1939)
- Lochanhead (closed 25 September 1939)
- Killywhan (closed 3 August 1959)
- Kirkgunzeon (closed 2 January 1950)
- Southwick (closed 25 September 1939; reopened 3 February 1941; closed 3 May 1965)
- Dalbeattie (closed 14 June 1965)
- Buittle (closed 1 October 1894)
- Castle Douglas (closed 14 June 1965).

The line west of Maxwelltown Oil Terminal closed on 14 June 1965, and the Maxwelltown stub closed in 1994, having been dormant for several years.

== Connections to other lines ==
- Glasgow, Dumfries and Carlisle Railway at Dumfries.
- The Dumfries, Lochmaben & Lockerbie Railway at Dumfries.
- Kirkcudbright Railway at Castle Douglas.
- Portpatrick Railway at Castle Douglas.
