= List of Category A listed buildings in Dumfries and Galloway =

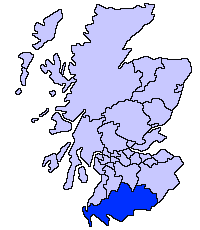
Dumfries and Galloway shown within Scotland

This is a list of Category A listed buildings in Dumfries and Galloway, Scotland.

In Scotland, the term listed building refers to a building or other structure officially designated as being of "special architectural or historic interest". Category A structures are those considered to be "buildings of national or international importance, either architectural or historic, or fine little-altered examples of some particular period, style or building type." Listing was begun by a provision in the Town and Country Planning (Scotland) Act 1947, and the current legislative basis for listing is the Planning (Listed Buildings and Conservation Areas) (Scotland) Act 1997. The authority for listing rests with Historic Scotland, an executive agency of the Scottish Government, which inherited this role from the Scottish Development Department in 1991. Once listed, severe restrictions are imposed on the modifications allowed to a building's structure or its fittings. Listed building consent must be obtained from local authorities prior to any alteration to such a structure. There are approximately 47,400 listed buildings in Scotland, of which around 8% (some 3,800) are Category A.

The council area of Dumfries and Galloway covers 6,426 square kilometres (2,481 sq mi), and has a population of around 148,600. There are 224 Category A listed buildings in the area.

== Listed buildings ==
Name	Location	Date listed	Geo-coordinates	Notes	LB number	Image
Rusco Tower	Gatehouse of Fleet		54°55′06″N 4°12′38″W	Early-16th-century tower house	3299	Upload another image See more images
Ardwall House	Anwoth		54°52′02″N 4°12′44″W	18th-century country house	3302	Upload another image See more images
Anwoth Old Church, Gordon Tomb and Churchyard	Anwoth		54°52′50″N 4°12′38″W	Ruins of 17th-century church, and early Renaissance monument to the Gordon family, circa 1620	3309	Upload another image See more images
Barscobe Castle	Balmaclellan		55°06′07″N 4°06′08″W	17th-century L-plan tower house, with later additions	3310	Upload another image See more images
Ironmacannie Mill	Ironmacannie, Balmaclellan		55°03′16″N 4°05′17″W	18th- and 19th-century grain mill, with much surviving machinery	3315	Upload another image See more images
Ken Bridge	New Galloway, carrying the A712 over the Water of Ken		55°04′52″N 4°07′52″W	Five-arch granite bridge by John Rennie, 1821	3316	Upload another image See more images
Millhouse Bridge	Millhousebridge, over the River Annan		55°09′21″N 3°24′24″W	30 metres (98 ft) single-span stone arch bridge (Note: Listed twice)	9954 3324, 9954	Upload Photo
Old Tollbar Cottage	Dinwoodie, Johnstonebridge		55°11′51″N 3°24′31″W	Toll house of 1822 by Thomas Telford	3327	Upload another image
Jardine Hall Stable Block	Millhousebridge		55°10′36″N 3°24′50″W	Large quadrangular stable block of 1825, possibly by James Gillespie Graham; Jardine Hall demolished 1964	3340	Upload Photo
Jardine Hall, Walled Garden and Gateways	Millhousebridge		55°10′37″N 3°24′58″W	Gardens of circa 1820, possibly by James Gillespie Graham; Jardine Hall demolished 1964	3341	Upload Photo
Buittle Bridge, (also known as Craignair Bridge)	Dalbeattie, carrying the A711 over the Urr Water		54°55′36″N 3°50′20″W	Single-arch stone bridge built 1797	3364	Upload another image See more images
Rammerscales House	Hightae, Lochmaben		55°05′05″N 3°26′23″W	Palladian mansion of circa 1760	3378	Upload another image
Corseyard Farm	Borgue		54°48′44″N 4°11′39″W	Italianate model dairy steading, built 1914 with elaborate finishes	3381	Upload another image See more images
Orchardton Tower	Palnackie		54°52′37″N 3°50′43″W	15th-century cylindrical tower, the only one known in Scotland	3387	Upload another image See more images
Borgue Old House	Borgue		54°48′36″N 4°07′40″W	Roofless house of 17th century	3393	Upload another image See more images
Plunton Castle	Borgue		54°49′55″N 4°10′24″W	Roofless mid-16th-century L-plan tower house	3403	Upload another image See more images
Threave Castle	Castle Douglas, on an island in the River Dee		54°56′21″N 3°58′11″W	Later 14th-century stronghold of the Black Douglases	3408	Upload another image See more images
Hensol House	Parton		55°00′19″N 4°04′20″W	Country house of 1822 by Robert Lugar	3415	Upload another image
Hensol House, The Lainshaw Sundial	Parton		55°00′19″N 4°04′19″W	Later 17th-century sundial, moved here from Lainshaw estate in Ayrshire	3416	Upload another image
Shillahill Bridge	Carries the A709 over the River Annan between Lochmaben and Lockerbie		55°06′45″N 3°24′10″W	Mid-19th-century five-arch bridge	3453	Upload another image See more images
Dalton Old Parish Churchyard	Dalton		55°03′09″N 3°23′17″W	Walled churchyard with 18th-20th century tombstones and monuments	3455	Upload another image
Denbie House	Dalton		55°02′35″N 3°23′34″W	Early-19th-century country house	3469	Upload Photo
Denbie, Dovecot	Dalton		55°02′39″N 3°23′46″W	Octagonal dovecote dated 1775	3470	Upload Photo
Bonshaw Tower and House	Kirtlebridge		55°02′14″N 3°11′12″W	Mid-16th-century tower house with 1770 country house and later additions	3489	Upload another image See more images
Brydekirk Bridge	Brydekirk over the River Annan		55°01′22″N 3°16′26″W	Three-arch road bridge of 1817	3494	Upload another image See more images
Gilnockie Bridge	Hollows, Canonbie, over the River Esk		55°05′39″N 2°57′50″W	Two-arch stone bridge built 1793	3504	Upload another image See more images
Byreburnfoot Bridge and Embankment	Hollows, Canonbie, over the Byre Burn		55°05′33″N 2°57′25″W	Single-span stone bridge of 1850	3520	Upload Photo
Hollows or Gilnockie Tower	Hollows, Canonbie		55°05′51″N 2°58′10″W	16th-century tower house, restored in 1980; unusual beacon tower	3527	Upload another image See more images
Cruck-framed building	Priorslynn, Canonbie		55°04′24″N 2°57′04″W	Later 18th-century clay-walled and cruck-framed agricultural building	3531	Upload Photo
Riddings Junction Viaduct	Rowanburn, over Liddel Water		55°04′18″N 2°55′27″W	Nine-arch railway viaduct built 1864, now disused (Note: Also in England, listed at grade II*, Historic England. "Riddings Junction Viaduct (1268307)". National Heritage List for England.)	3533	Upload another image See more images
Tarrasfoot Tile Works	Tarrasfoot, Canonbie		55°07′09″N 2°58′22″W	19th- and early-20th-century tile works, now disused	3535	Upload Photo
Hoddom Castle	Brydekirk		55°02′38″N 3°19′20″W	16th-century tower house with 17th- and 19th-century additions	3558	Upload another image See more images
Repentance Tower	Hoddom Castle, Brydekirk		55°02′15″N 3°19′26″W	16th-century tower house	3570	Upload another image See more images
Kinmount House	Cummertrees		55°00′19″N 3°20′45″W	Country house of 1820, by Robert Smirke	3582	Upload another image See more images
Grennan Mill	St John's Town of Dalry		55°05′55″N 4°07′40″W	18th- and 19th-century water mill with intact machinery	3625	Upload Photo
Crossmichael Parish Church	Crossmichael		54°58′52″N 3°59′11″W	Church of 1751 with 16th- or 17th-century tower	3698	Upload another image See more images
Crossmichael Church, Gordon Memorial	Crossmichael		54°58′52″N 3°59′10″W	18th-century classical burial enclosure	3699	Upload another image
Glenlochar Bridge	Glenlochar		54°57′33″N 3°58′54″W	Five-arch stone bridge circa 1797	3706	Upload Photo
Greenlaw House	Castle Douglas		54°57′31″N 3°56′50″W	18th-century classical villa, gutted by fire in the 1980s	3708	Upload Photo
Southwick Home Farm	Caulkerbush, Southerness		54°53′45″N 3°39′34″W	Large, well-preserved 19th-century steading and water mill	3723	Upload another image
Stapleton Tower	Dornock		55°00′31″N 3°11′53″W	16th-century tower house	3782	Upload another image See more images
Dornock House, old farmhouse and steading	Dornock		54°58′57″N 3°12′08″W	18th-century farmstead complex	3792	Upload Photo
Caerlaverock Castle	Caerlaverock		54°58′33″N 3°31′27″W	Substantial remains of late-13th-century moated castle	3799	Upload another image See more images
Ladyfield West (formerly Hannayfield)	Dumfries		55°03′13″N 3°36′05″W	Villa of 1830 by Walter Newall	3829	Upload Photo
Crichton Royal Hospital, Crichton Hall	The Crichton, Dumfries		55°03′13″N 3°35′48″W	Hospital building by William Burn, opened 1839 with later additions	3839	Upload Photo
Durisdeer Parish Church and Queensberry Mausoleum	Durisdeer		55°18′56″N 3°44′39″W	Church of 1720 by James Smith, adjacent mausoleum to Duke of Queensberry with sculpture by John Van Nost	3856	Upload another image See more images
Drumlanrig Castle	Carronbridge, Thornhill		55°16′25″N 3°48′31″W	Courtyard castle remodelled 1689, probably to design of Robert Mylne	3886	Upload another image See more images
Wallacehall Assessment Centre (former Academy and Schoolhouse)	Closeburn		55°12′49″N 3°43′35″W	18th-century school house	3953	Upload Photo
Auldgirth Bridge	Auldgirth		55°09′34″N 3°42′35″W	Three-arch road bridge of 1782 by David Henderson	3966	Upload another image See more images
Dalgonar Bridge	Dunscore, over Cairn Water		55°08′17″N 3°47′22″W	Single-arch stone bridge dated 1818	4227	Upload Photo
Dunscore Parish Church	Dunscore		55°08′25″N 3°46′47″W	Gothic church of 1824 by James Thomson of Dumfries	4230	Upload another image See more images
Ellisland Farm	Auldgirth		55°08′15″N 3°40′49″W	1788 farm built for the poet Robert Burns, now a museum	4232	Upload another image See more images
Crichton Farm	The Crichton, Dumfries		55°02′53″N 3°35′34″W	Extensive industrial farm complex, built 1893	6693	Upload Photo
Crichton Memorial Church	The Crichton, Dumfries		55°03′03″N 3°35′39″W	Large Gothic church of 1897, by Sydney Mitchell and Wilson	6695	Upload another image See more images
Hills Tower	Cargenbridge		55°02′12″N 3°42′13″W	16th-century tower house and 18th-century house	9715	Upload another image See more images
Duchess Bridge	Langholm Lodge, over the River Esk, Langholm		55°09′26″N 3°00′44″W	Cast-iron bridge built 1813, probably the earliest existing iron bridge in Scotland	9734	Upload another image See more images
Knocknalling Barn	Knocknalling, St John's Town of Dalry		55°08′17″N 4°12′12″W	Mid-19th-century stone barn with triangular vents	9746	Upload Photo
Milnholm Farmhouse and Steading	Langholm		55°10′32″N 3°00′50″W	Later 19th-century farm and steading	9763	Upload Photo
Skipper's Bridge (A7 Over River Esk)	Langholm, carrying the A7 over the River Esk		55°08′27″N 2°59′20″W	Three-arch road bridge of circa 1700	9764	Upload another image See more images
Mossknowe House	Kirkpatrick Fleming		55°01′02″N 3°07′33″W	Palladian mansion of unusual composition, dated 1767	9799	Upload Photo
Springkell House	Eaglesfield		55°03′56″N 3°10′05″W	Palladian mansion dated 1734	9805	Upload Photo
Wyseby, former stables with dovecot	Kirtlebridge		55°02′28″N 3°11′21″W	Mid-18th-century stables and early 19th century dovecot	9808	Upload Photo
Graham of Mossknowe burial enclosure	Kirkpatrick Fleming Parish Churchyard, Kirkpatrick Fleming		55°01′12″N 3°08′00″W	Later 17th-century Renaissance burial enclosure	9813	Upload Photo
Douglas Mausoleum, near to Kelton Parish Church	Kelton		54°55′20″N 3°56′18″W	Pyramidal mausoleum, built circa 1820 for James Douglas	9835	Upload another image
Gelston Castle	Gelston, Castle Douglas		54°54′17″N 3°54′31″W	Country house in Adam castellated style, 1805, attributed to Richard Crichton, now derelict	9836	Upload another image See more images
Old Bridge of Dee	Bridge of Dee, Castle Douglas, over the River Dee		54°55′06″N 3°58′34″W	18th-century four-arch bridge	9838	Upload another image See more images
Craigielands House	Beattock		55°17′58″N 3°27′22″W	Greek-revival villa by William Burn, 1817	9842	Upload Photo
Cally Palace Hotel, formerly Cally House	Gatehouse of Fleet		54°52′11″N 4°11′00″W	Classically detailed country house, built 1765 by Robert Mylne	9854	Upload another image See more images
Girthon Old Kirk churchyard	Girthon, Gatehouse of Fleet		54°51′21″N 4°10′26″W	17th-century churchyard	9859	Upload another image
Raehills House	St Ann's, Johnstonebridge		55°14′04″N 3°28′26″W	18th-century mansion by Alexander Stevens, remodelled in 1834 by William Burn	9898	Upload another image
The Old Brig Inn	Beattock		55°18′39″N 3°27′18″W	Coaching inn of 1821 by Thomas Telford	9908	Upload another image See more images
Hutton and Corrie Parish Church	Boreland		55°12′17″N 3°18′18″W	Early-18th-century church	9911	Upload another image See more images
Corsewall Lighthouse	Corsewall Point, Stranraer		55°00′25″N 5°09′33″W	Lighthouse and keeper's house 1815 by Robert Stevenson, 1889 additions by David Alan Stevenson	9923	Upload another image See more images
Kinnel Bridge	Lochmaben, B7020 over Kinnel Water		55°09′04″N 3°25′50″W	18th-century three-arch road bridge, widened in the 19th century	9950	Upload another image
Spedlins Tower	Millhousebridge		55°10′26″N 3°25′06″W	15th-century tower house, remodelled circa 1605, and restored in the 1980s	9965	Upload another image See more images
Elshieshields Tower	Elshieshields, Lochmaben		55°09′03″N 3°27′45″W	16th-century L-plan tower house and early-18th-century house	9970	Upload Photo
Halleaths Former Stables	Halleaths, Lochmaben		55°07′37″N 3°25′02″W	Large stable court dated 1843, in the style of Walter Newall	9971	Upload Photo
Hoddom Bridge	Hoddom, Brydekirk, over River Annan		55°02′31″N 3°18′37″W	18th-century three-arch stone bridge	10026	Upload another image
Shortrig Windmill Tower, Horsemill and Steading	Shortrigg, Ecclefechan		55°03′24″N 3°18′51″W	18th-century windmill, early-19th-century horse-mill, and 18th-19th-century courtyard steading	10041	Upload Photo
Arched House including Carlyle's Birthplace	Ecclefechan High Street		55°03′33″N 3°15′51″W	18th-century pair of houses, including the birthplace of writer Thomas Carlyle	10065	Upload another image See more images
Kirkcowan Parish Church	Kirkcowan		54°54′55″N 4°36′40″W	Gothic church built 1834	10066	Upload another image See more images
Craichlaw House	Craighlaw, Kirkcowan		54°54′57″N 4°38′38″W	16th-century tower house and adjoining 19th-century Baronial mansion by Wardrop and Brown	10076	Upload Photo
Barholm Castle	Barholm, Gatehouse of Fleet		54°50′58″N 4°18′20″W	17th-century L-plan tower house, restored in the early 21st century	10093	Upload another image See more images
Carsluith Castle	Carsluith, Gatehouse of Fleet		54°51′34″N 4°20′48″W	Late-15th-century tower house with later additions	10104	Upload another image See more images
Baldoon Castle Gatepiers	Bladnoch, Wigtown		54°51′09″N 4°27′13″W	Mid-17th-century Renaissance gatepiers	10109	Upload another image See more images
Old Place of Monreith, or Dowies	Monreith, Glasserton		54°45′21″N 4°31′02″W	Early-17th-century tower house of unusual plan, restored in the 19th century and in the 1980s	10123	Upload another image See more images
Ravenstone Castle	Drumjin, Whithorn		54°46′02″N 4°28′27″W	16th-century L-plan tower house with later additions, now derelict	10133	Upload another image See more images
Glasserton Parish Church	Glasserton		54°42′47″N 4°27′08″W	18th-century church, with 19th-century tower and session house	10137	Upload another image See more images
Craigcaffie Tower	Craigcaffie, Stranraer		54°56′06″N 4°59′06″W	16th-century tower house, restored in 1983	10164	Upload another image See more images
Lochryan House	Cairnryan		54°58′33″N 5°01′36″W	Early-18th-century mansion with 19th-century alterations	10168	Upload another image
Lochinch Castle	Lochinch Estate, Castle Kennedy		54°54′53″N 4°57′22″W	Baronial mansion by Brown and Wardrop, 1868	10179	Upload another image See more images
Castle Kennedy	Lochinch Estate, Castle Kennedy		54°54′26″N 4°56′56″W	Remains of early-17th-century tower house, burned down 1716	10181	Upload another image See more images
Old Bridge of Urr Mill	Old Bridge of Urr, Kirkpatrick Durham		54°59′20″N 3°54′49″W	Water mill with rare surviving timber-framed water wheel	10191	Upload another image
Fourmerkland Tower	Fourmerkland, Dumfries		55°06′33″N 3°42′45″W	Late-16th-century tower house	10204	Upload another image See more images
West Gallaberry Farm Steading and Horsemill	Kirkton, Locharbriggs		55°07′38″N 3°37′34″W	Early-19th-century steading courtyard	10218	Upload Photo
Blackwood House Former Stables	Auldgirth		55°09′55″N 3°43′03″W	18th-century stable courtyard with dovecot tower	10244	Upload Photo
Capenoch House	Penpont		55°13′30″N 3°49′11″W	Baronial mansion completed in 1868 by David Bryce	10247	Upload Photo
Kilneiss House	Moniaive		55°11′53″N 3°55′41″W	Arts and Crafts cottage by John James Burnet for the artist James Paterson	10298	Upload Photo
Carnsalloch House	Kirkton, Locharbriggs		55°06′23″N 3°36′52″W	Palladian mansion house dated 1759	10300	Upload Photo
Carnsalloch Chapel at The Mount	Kirkton, Locharbriggs		55°06′44″N 3°36′32″W	Small Gothic chapel by Edward Buckton Lamb circa 1850	10301	Upload Photo
Carnsalloch Former Stables	Kirkton, Locharbriggs		55°06′26″N 3°36′40″W	18th-century classical stable courtyard	10303	Upload Photo
Glenluiart House	Moniaive		55°11′48″N 3°56′34″W	Arts and Crafts mansion of 1900 by William West Neve	10307	Upload another image
Glencairn Parish Church	Kirkland, Moniaive		55°11′39″N 3°52′21″W	Gothic church built 1836	10312	Upload another image See more images
Craigdarroch House	Moniaive		55°11′47″N 3°58′44″W	Classical mansion, dated 1729, by William Adam	10340	Upload another image See more images
Ross Mains	Templand		55°11′00″N 3°28′02″W	Early classical house, dated 1728, possibly by James Smith	10353	Upload another image
John Paul Jones' Cottage	Arbigland, Kirkbean		54°53′56″N 3°34′49″W	18th-century cottage, birthplace in 1747 of Admiral John Paul Jones	10397	Upload another image See more images
Arbigland House	Arbigland, Kirkbean		54°54′05″N 3°34′37″W	Mid-18th-century Classical mansion house, built for and probably by William Craik of Arbigland	10398	Upload Photo
Southerness Lighthouse	Southerness		54°52′22″N 3°35′42″W	Built in 1748 as a navigational marker, lighthouse built circa 1811, rebuilt by Walter Newall 1842-3	10415	Upload another image See more images
Shennanton House	Shennanton, Kirkcowan		54°56′45″N 4°35′35″W	English vernacular country house of 1908 by Henry Edward Clifford	13106	Upload Photo
Kirkdale Bridge	On the A75 between Gatehouse of Fleet and Creetown		54°51′02″N 4°18′40″W	1787 bridge designed by Robert Adam	13137	Upload another image See more images
Kirkdale House and Sundial	Kirkdale, Gatehouse of Fleet		54°51′08″N 4°18′54″W	1787 country house by Robert Adam, now flats	13138	Upload another image
Kirkdale Kirk and Kirkdale Mausoleum	Kirkdale, Gatehouse of Fleet		54°51′33″N 4°19′10″W	Ruins of 18th-century Old Kirk of Kirkdale and classical mausoleum dated 1787, probably by Robert Adam	13139	Upload another image
Kirkdale Steadings and Slaughterhouse	Kirkdale, Gatehouse of Fleet		54°51′18″N 4°19′05″W	1787 steading, probably by Robert Adam	13140	Upload Photo
Lochnaw Castle	Leswalt, Stranraer		54°55′11″N 5°08′09″W	16th-century tower house and 17th-century L-plan range	13498	Upload another image See more images
Lochnaw, Walled Garden	Leswalt, Stranraer		54°55′18″N 5°08′25″W	Early-19th-century polygonal walled garden	13505	Upload Photo
Logan House	Logan, Rhins of Galloway		54°44′39″N 4°57′32″W	Classical mansion of 1702, remodelled 1952	13564	Upload another image
Logan Windmill	Logan, Rhins of Galloway		54°45′13″N 4°55′50″W	Tower of 17th-century windmill	13570	Upload another image See more images
Mull of Galloway Lighthouse	Mull of Galloway		54°38′06″N 4°51′26″W	Lighthouse and keeper's house by Robert Stevenson, 1828	13578	Upload another image See more images
Old Parish Church of Kirkmaiden	Kirkmaiden, Rhins of Galloway		54°41′32″N 4°54′42″W	17th-century T-plan church	13581	Upload another image See more images
Kirkmadrine Church	Sandhead, Rhins of Galloway		54°47′37″N 4°59′16″W	Late-19th-century mausoleum chapel	16739	Upload another image See more images
Portpatrick Old Parish Church	Portpatrick		54°50′34″N 5°07′00″W	Remains of 17th-century church with earlier round tower, possibly a lighthouse	16743	Upload another image See more images
Isle Castle	Isle of Whithorn		54°42′05″N 4°21′57″W	Small, 17th-century L-plan tower house	16751	Upload another image See more images
Castle of Park	Glenluce		54°52′34″N 4°49′32″W	Late-16th-century L-plan tower house	16761	Upload another image See more images
Haugh Bridge	Haugh of Urr, over Urr Water		54°58′27″N 3°52′04″W	Two-arch stone bridge built 1763 as part of military road	16807	Upload Photo
Archbank Farm, tall barn with waterwheel	Moffat		55°20′48″N 3°26′06″W	Late-18th-century agricultural buildings	16847	Upload Photo
Granton House	Moffat		55°22′28″N 3°27′43″W	Small Greek Revival villa, circa 1830 by Walter Newall	16858	Upload Photo
Heatheryhaugh	Moffat		55°20′31″N 3°25′57″W	Early-19th-century Gothic Revival villa	16861	Upload Photo
Cruggleton Church	Garlieston		54°45′26″N 4°22′00″W	Remains of 12th-century church, rebuilt c. 1890 by 3rd Marquis of Bute	16875	Upload another image See more images
Galloway House	Garlieston		54°46′45″N 4°22′02″W	18th-century house by John Douglas, additions by William Burn and Robert Lorimer	16876	Upload another image See more images
Castlemilk	Kettleholm, Lockerbie		55°05′04″N 3°20′03″W	Scots Baronial mansion, 1865 by David Bryce	16888	Upload Photo
Castlemilk, Driveway Bridge	Kettleholm, Lockerbie		55°04′57″N 3°19′56″W	Scots Baronial bridge, 1865 by David Bryce	16890	Upload Photo
Westerkirk Old Churchyard, Johnstone Mausoleum	Bentpath, Eskdale		55°12′09″N 3°04′52″W	Classical mausoleum by Robert Adam, circa 1790.	16921	Upload another image
Bentpath Bridge	Bentpath, over River Esk, Eskdale		55°12′06″N 3°04′59″W	Three-arch road bridge built circa 1736	16939	Upload another image
Barwhinnock House	Twynholm		54°52′18″N 4°05′41″W	Early-19th-century Classical house	16989	Upload Photo
Cumstoun House	Tongland		54°51′26″N 4°03′10″W	Tudor Gothic house built 1829 by Thomas Hamilton	16993	Upload another image
Cumloden House	Minnigaff, Newton Stewart		54°58′43″N 4°28′28″W	Gothic cottage house, circa 1820	17052	Upload another image
Garlies Castle	Minnigaff, Newton Stewart		54°59′31″N 4°28′04″W	Remains of late-15th- or early-16th-century castle	17057	Upload another image See more images
Dundrennan Abbey	Dundrennan		54°48′24″N 3°56′50″W	Ruins of 12th-century Cistercian abbey	17072	Upload another image See more images
Corsock House, Gates and Gatepiers	Corsock		55°03′23″N 3°56′41″W	Large, mid-19th-century ornamental Gothic cast-iron gates	17094	Upload another image
Argrennan House	Bridge of Dee, Castle Douglas		54°54′03″N 4°00′22″W	18th-century house, added to in the 19th century by James Gillespie Graham	17114	Upload another image
Old Tongland Bridge	Tongland, over River Dee		54°51′38″N 4°01′54″W	Tongland, over River Dee	17123	Upload Photo
Tongland Bridge	Tongland, over River Dee		54°51′28″N 4°02′21″W	Single-arch stone bridge built 1808 by Thomas Telford and Alexander Nasmyth	17125	Upload another image See more images
Tongland Hydro-Electric Power Station	Tongland		54°51′35″N 4°02′04″W	Power station built 1934	17126	Upload another image See more images
Torthorwald Cruck Cottage	Torthorwald		55°05′29″N 3°31′02″W	19th-century cruck-framed and thatched cottage	17157	Upload another image
Wanlockhead Village Library	Wanlockhead		55°23′52″N 3°46′47″W	Small village library, dated 1850	17192	Upload another image
Goldielea Viaduct	Goldielea, Cargenbridge		55°02′44″N 3°40′31″W	18-arch former railway bridge opened 1859 as part of Castle Douglas to Dumfries railway	17201	Upload another image See more images
Kirkconnel House	Kirkconnel		54°59′47″N 3°35′46″W	16th-century house with later additions	17204	Upload Photo
Terregles Estate Former Stables	Terregles		55°04′54″N 3°40′31″W	Stable block probably by Sir Robert Smirke, circa 1831	17208	Upload Photo
Tynron Parish Church	Tynron		55°13′01″N 3°52′42″W	Gothic church by William Burn, built 1837	17222	Upload another image See more images
Amisfield Tower	Amisfield		55°08′18″N 3°34′58″W	16th-century tower house	17233	Upload another image See more images
Tinwald House	Tinwald		55°06′26″N 3°32′31″W	Classical mansion house by William Adam, dated 1740	17238	Upload another image
Tinwald House Cottages	Tinwald		55°06′24″N 3°32′30″W	Service quarters probably by William Adam, circa 1740	17239	Upload Photo
Tinwald House Farm Steading	Tinwald		55°06′27″N 3°32′34″W	Steading probably by William Adam, circa 1740	17240	Upload Photo
Comlongon Castle	Clarencefield, Ruthwell	4 November 1971	55°00′24″N 3°26′27″W	15th-century tower house and 1902 mansion house by James Barbour and J.M. Bowie	17245	Upload another image See more images
Ruthwell Museum	Ruthwell		54°59′35″N 3°24′19″W	Built circa 1760, former Henry Duncan Savings Bank opened 1810 as Scotland's first savings bank	17249	Upload another image
Nith Bridge	Thornhill, over River Nith		55°14′26″N 3°46′39″W	Later 18th-century two-arch stone road bridge	17286	Upload another image See more images
Drumlanrig Low Gardens House (Gardeners House)	Drumlanrig Estate		55°15′53″N 3°47′57″W	Picturesque cottage by William Burn, circa 1831	17297	Upload Photo
Sweetheart Abbey	New Abbey		54°58′49″N 3°37′07″W	Remains of Cistercian abbey founded in 1273	17304	Upload another image See more images
New Abbey Mill (Monksmill)	New Abbey		54°58′48″N 3°37′23″W	Mid to late-18th-century water-mill, in working order	17323	Upload another image See more images
Thornhill Cross	Thornhill		55°14′27″N 3°45′54″W	Mercat cross erected 1714, possibly by James Smith	17337	Upload another image
The Old House	New Abbey		54°58′47″N 3°37′25″W	17th-century house	17346	Upload another image
Monument to Henry Duncan	Mount Kedar, Mouswald		55°01′47″N 3°27′13″W	Monument by James Raeburn, erected 1846 to the Rev. Henry Duncan (1774–1846)	17388	Upload Photo
Sorbie Tower	Sorbie		54°47′39″N 4°24′40″W	Late-16th-century tower house	19181	Upload another image See more images
All Saints Episcopal Church	Challoch, Newton Stewart		54°58′33″N 4°31′29″W	Gothic Revival church by William Habershon and Alfred Pite, built 1872	19190	Upload another image See more images
Tonderghie House	Isle of Whithorn		54°41′31″N 4°25′02″W	Mid-18th-century country house	19248	Upload another image
Tonderghie Steadings	Isle of Whithorn		54°41′22″N 4°25′07″W	19th-century steading with an almost complete horse-powered threshing machine	19249	Upload Photo
Heron Monument	Monigaff Parish Churchyard, Minnigaff		54°58′06″N 4°29′08″W	Classical monument of the Heron family, dated 1761	19313	Upload Photo
Monreith House	Port William		54°45′13″N 4°33′23″W	Classical mansion house by Alexander Stevens, built 1791	19561	Upload another image See more images
Old Place of Mochrum	Culshabbin, Mochrum		54°51′09″N 4°38′13″W	Two 16th-century towers linked and restored in the later 19th-century	19570	Upload another image See more images
Annan Bridge	Annan, carrying the A75 over the River Annan		54°59′14″N 3°15′57″W	Three-arch road bridge by Robert Stevenson, 1826	21061	Upload another image See more images
27, 29 Bank Street	Annan		54°59′10″N 3°15′44″W	Former British Linen Bank in the style of Walter Newall, circa 1840	21066	Upload Photo
5, 7, 9 High Street (Old Academy)	Annan		54°59′13″N 3°15′53″W	Mid-18th-century town house, formerly the burgh academy	21086	Upload another image
Annan Old Parish Church	Annan, High Street		54°59′15″N 3°15′30″W	Parish church with classical details, dated 1789	21106	Upload another image See more images
Castle Douglas Cattle Mart	Castle Douglas		54°56′33″N 3°55′28″W	Octagonal cattle market built 1900	22976	Upload another image See more images
Lincluden Collegiate Church	Lincluden, Dumfries		55°05′05″N 3°37′15″W	Ruins of 14th- or 15th-century church	26075	Upload another image See more images
5, 7, 9, 11 Bank Street	Dumfries		55°04′04″N 3°36′45″W	Mid-18th-century town house, former home of Robert Burns	26083	Upload Photo
Former Methodist Church	Dumfries, Buccleuch Street		55°04′13″N 3°36′48″W	Classical church by Thomas Hunt, 1817	26102	Upload another image See more images
Robert Burns' House	Dumfries, Burns Street		55°03′58″N 3°36′29″W	18th-century house in which Robert Burns lived from 1793 until his death in 1796	26115	Upload another image See more images
25–37 Castle Street (odd numbers)	Dumfries		55°04′13″N 3°36′49″W	Terrace of seven houses built circa 1830 to design by Robert Burn	26118	Upload Photo
41, 43, 45, 47 Castle Street	Dumfries		55°04′17″N 3°36′53″W	Terrace built in the 1820s to design by Robert Burn	26120	Upload Photo
14-24 Castle Street (even numbers)	Dumfries		55°04′14″N 3°36′47″W	Terrace built between 1806 and 1819 to design by Robert Burn	26122	Upload Photo
26, 28, 30 Castle Street	Dumfries		55°04′17″N 3°36′51″W	Terrace built between 1806 and 1819 to design by Robert Burn	26123	Upload Photo
Greyfriars Church	Dumfries		55°04′14″N 3°36′45″W	Decorated Gothic style church by John Starforth, 1868	26126	Upload another image See more images
Dumfries Museum Observatory	Dumfries		55°03′55″N 3°36′52″W	Late-18th-century windmill, remodelled by Walter Newall in 1836 as an observatory	26135	Upload another image See more images
Queensberry Column	Dumfries, English Street		55°04′09″N 3°36′39″W	Memorial column to 3rd Duke of Queensberry by Robert Adam, 1780	26173	Upload another image See more images
Midsteeple	Dumfries, High Street		55°04′09″N 3°36′39″W	Town house and clock tower built 1707	26215	Upload another image See more images
The Globe Inn	Dumfries, High Street		55°04′03″N 3°36′35″W	Mid-18th-century inn	26230	Upload another image
Former Trades Hall	Dumfries, Queensberry Square		55°04′08″N 3°36′38″W	Classical hall by Thomas Boyd, 1804	26234	Upload another image
29 Irish Street and 92 Whitesands	Dumfries		55°03′59″N 3°36′39″W	Earlier 18th-century town house	26240	Upload another image
24 Nith Place	Dumfries		55°04′00″N 3°36′34″W	Earlier 18th-century Baroque town house	26305	Upload Photo
St Michael's Church	Dumfries, St Michael's Street		55°03′54″N 3°36′21″W	Mid-18th-century church	26335	Upload another image See more images
St Michael's Churchyard	Dumfries, St Michael Street		55°03′55″N 3°36′21″W	18th- and 19th-century monuments including Baroque Sharp of Hoddom monument	26336	Upload another image
St Michael's Churchyard, Burns' Mausoleum	Dumfries, St Michael Street		55°03′54″N 3°36′18″W	Octagonal mausoleum of Robert Burns, by Thomas Hunt, 1815	26337	Upload another image See more images
Devorgilla Bridge	Dumfries, over River Nith		55°04′06″N 3°36′58″W	Medieval bridge, rebuilt many times	26354	Upload another image See more images
Blair House	Kirkcudbright, High Street		54°50′13″N 4°03′16″W	Early-19th-century town house	36529	Upload another image
Broughton House	Kirkcudbright, High Street		54°50′13″N 4°03′16″W	Mid-18th-century classical detached house	36530	Upload another image See more images
Kirkcudbright Tolbooth and Market Cross	Kirkcudbright, High Street		54°50′08″N 4°03′21″W	16th-century tolbooth and 17th-century mercat cross	36542	Upload another image See more images
66, 68, 70 High Street	Kirkcudbright		54°50′07″N 4°03′20″W	17th-century terraced houses	36545	Upload Photo
74 High Street and Cannon's Close	Kirkcudbright		54°50′07″N 4°03′19″W	17th-century terraced houses	36546	Upload Photo
Langholm Parish Church	Langholm		55°09′01″N 3°00′12″W	Large Gothic church by William Burn and David Bryce, 1843	37137	Upload another image See more images
Lochmaben Parish Church	Lochmaben		55°07′35″N 3°26′19″W	Gothic church built 1820, in the style of Walter Newall	37539	Upload another image See more images
Lochmaben Tolbooth	Lochmaben		55°07′44″N 3°26′30″W	18th-century tolbooth with 19th-century additions by David Bryce	37541	Upload another image See more images
Lockerbie Town Hall	Lockerbie		55°07′18″N 3°21′17″W	Scots Baronial town hall by David Bryce, built from 1884	37579	Upload another image See more images
St Andrew's Parish Church	Moffat		55°19′54″N 3°26′41″W	Gothic church by John Starforth, 1887	37881	Upload another image See more images
Moffat House Hotel	Moffat		55°20′02″N 3°26′46″W	Substantial house by John Adam for the Earl of Hopetoun, 1762	37928	Upload another image
Sidmount Cottage	Moffat		55°20′08″N 3°26′12″W	Villa dated 1836	37935	Upload Photo
Penninghame Parish Church	Newton Stewart		54°57′28″N 4°29′07″W	Gothic church by William Burn, 1838	38663	Upload another image See more images
Cree Bridge	Newton Stewart, over River Cree		54°57′36″N 4°28′57″W	Five-arch stone bridge, built 1813 by John Rennie	38667	Upload another image
Douglas House, former Douglas School	Newton Stewart, King Street		54°58′00″N 4°29′15″W	Former school of 1834, by John Henderson	38672	Upload Photo
Sanquhar Tolbooth	Sanquhar		55°22′05″N 3°55′30″W	Baroque tolbooth by William Adam, 1735	40540	Upload another image See more images
Stranraer Museum, formerly Old Town Hall	Stranraer, George Street		54°54′16″N 5°01′42″W	18th-century town hall with 19th-century extension	41745	Upload another image See more images
Stranraer Castle	Stranraer		54°54′16″N 5°01′34″W	Early-16th-century L-plan tower house, remodelled in the 1980s	41765	Upload another image See more images
53 George Street and entrance to Whithorn Priory	Whithorn		54°43′59″N 4°24′57″W	Later 18th-century house with arched pend	42195	Upload another image
55–57 (odd nos) George Street	Whithorn		54°43′59″N 4°24′57″W	18th-century houses	42196	Upload another image
18 and 20 King Street	Stranraer		54°54′18″N 5°01′49″W	Early-19th-century bakery and shop	45230	Upload Photo

== See also ==
- Scheduled monuments in Dumfries and Galloway
