= Corsewall Lighthouse =

Lighthouse in Scotland

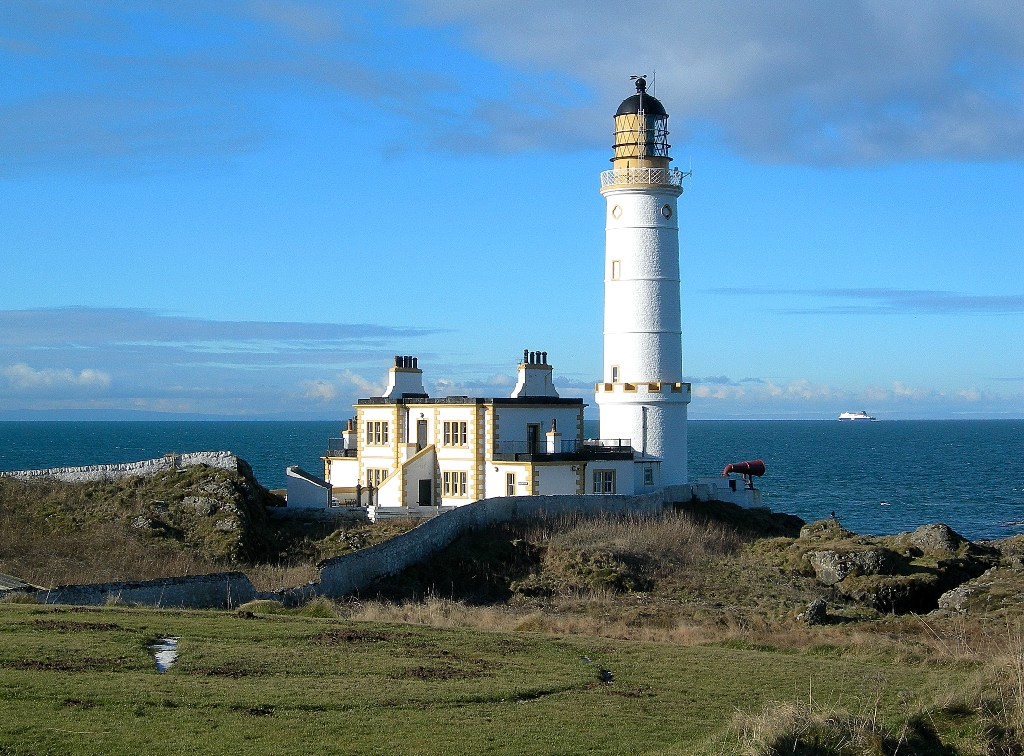
- Corsewall Lighthouse and Hotel
- Location: Corsewall Point, Dumfries and Galloway, Kirkcolm, United Kingdom
- OS grid: NW9807572614
- Coordinates: 55°00′25″N 5°09′33″W

Tower
- Constructed: 1816
- Built by: Robert Stevenson
- Construction: masonry (tower)
- Automated: 1994
- Height: 34 m (112 ft)
- Shape: cylinder
- Markings: white (tower), black (lantern), ochre (trim)
- Power source: mains electricity
- Operator: Northern Lighthouse Board
- Heritage: category A listed building

Light
- First lit: 1817
- Focal height: 34 m (112 ft)
- Range: 22 nmi (41 km; 25 mi)
- Characteristic: Fl(5) W 30s

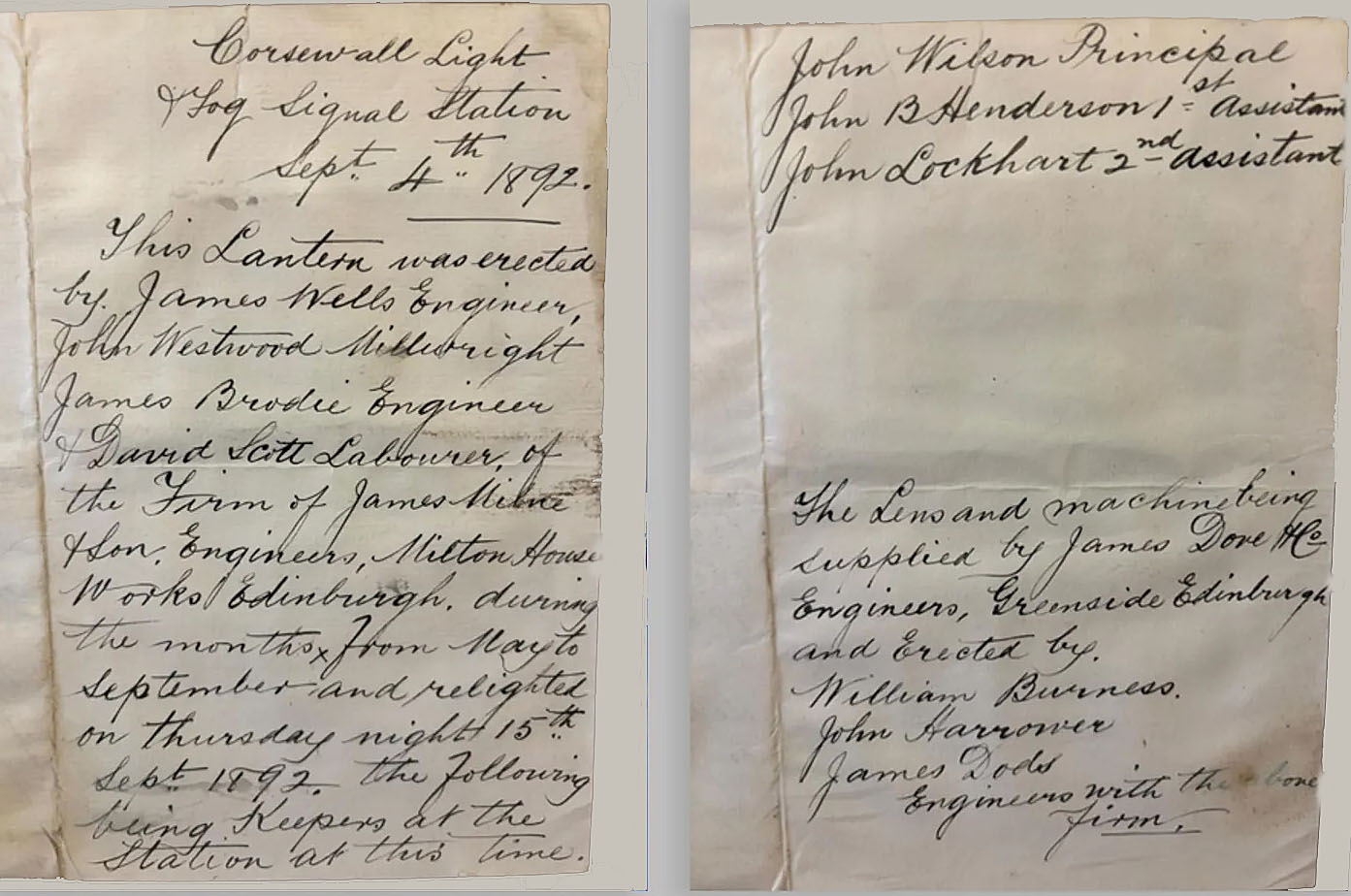
This 1892 quill-and-ink commemoration of Scottish lighthouse engineers was discovered in 2024.

Corsewall Lighthouse is a lighthouse at Corsewall Point, Kirkcolm near Stranraer in the region of Dumfries and Galloway in Scotland. First lit in 1817, it overlooks the North Channel of the Irish Sea.

Corsewall is defined as the place or well of the Cross.

== History ==
In 1814, a Mr Kirkman Finley applied to the Trade of Clyde for a lighthouse on Corsewall Point. The Northern Lighthouse Board investigated the site and in 1815 decided that a lighthouse should be built at the entrance of Loch Ryan, Galloway. When the engineer and lighthouse designer Robert Stevenson undertook an inspection voyage in December 1815, he observed that the lighthouse tower, at 30 feet (9.1 m), and house were under construction.

Corsewall Lighthouse was first lit in 1817. That same year, the Principal Keeper was reported for incompetence after falling asleep while on duty. For a period of time the revolving apparatus of the light had stopped. The Keeper was suspended and demoted becoming an assistant at Bell Rock Lighthouse. He never again chiefly monitored a lighthouse.

In November 1970, Concorde reportedly flew over the lighthouse on a trial flight and shattered panes of glass on the lighthouse. Later flights did not affect it.

In 1994, the light was automated and monitored from the Northern Lighthouse Board in Edinburgh. The lighthouse keepers accommodation has been converted into the Corsewall Lighthouse Hotel.

In 1892, three engineers who were installing a new light hid a message in a bottle at the lighthouse. The bottle and message were discovered in 2024 while the lighthouse was undergoing refurbishment.

== See also ==
- List of lighthouses in Scotland
- List of Northern Lighthouse Board lighthouses
- List of Category A listed buildings in Dumfries and Galloway
