= Crossmichael Parish Church =

Church in Dumfries and Galloway, Scotland

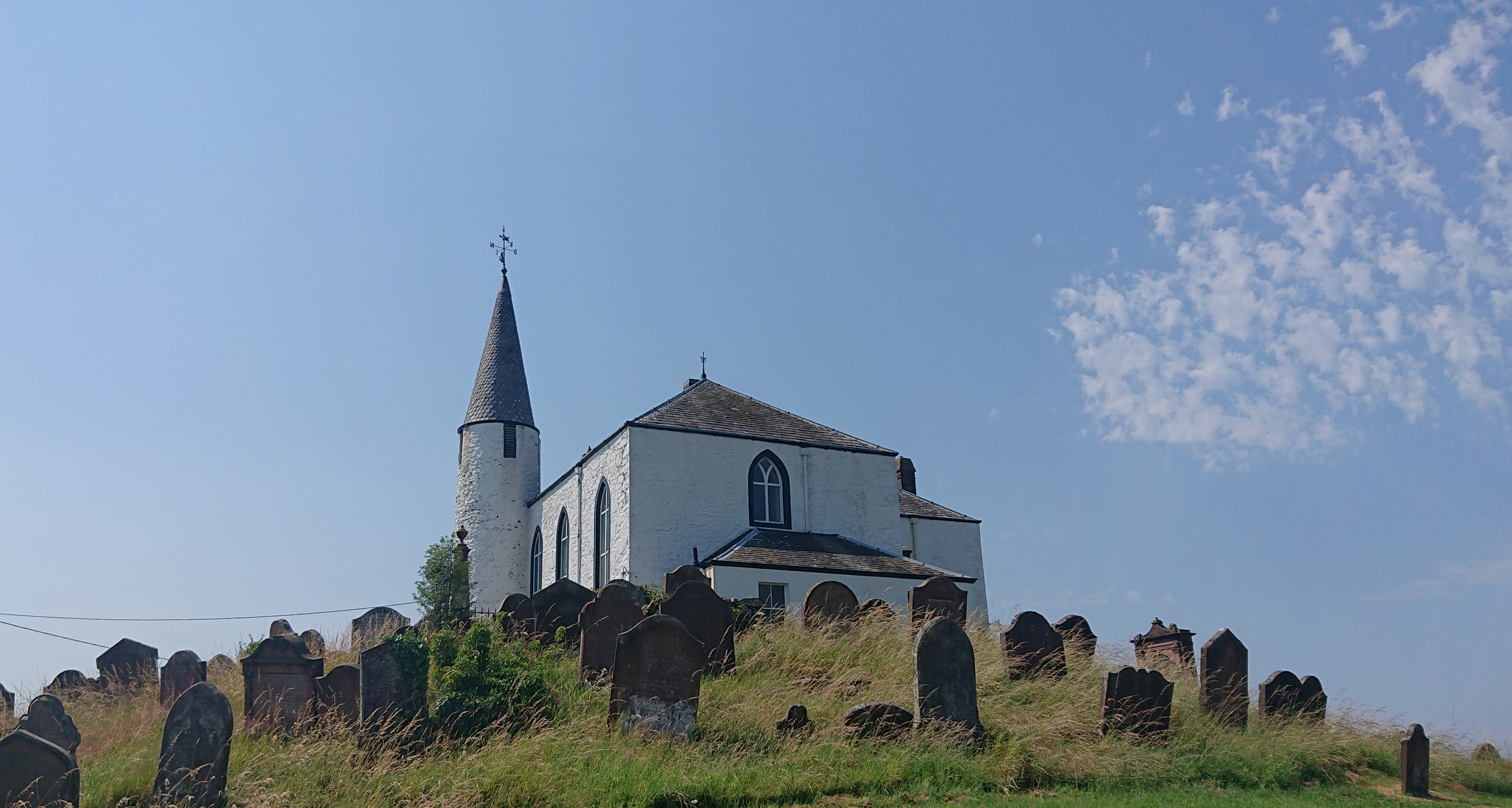
- Crossmichael Parish Church and burial ground
- Crossmichael Parish Church
- 54°58′52″N 3°59′11″W
- Location: Crossmichael
- Country: Scotland
- Denomination: Church of Scotland

History
- Founded: 1751, with 16th- or 17th-century tower

Architecture
- Functional status: In use
- Heritage designation: Category A listed building
- Designated: 1971

Crossmichael Parish Church is an ecclesiastical building in Crossmichael, Dumfries and Galloway, Scotland. It lies on a knoll, which was probably an ancient site of worship, at the north end of the village. Its tower may date from 1611, but the main block was built in 1749–1751, and there were additions and alterations in the nineteenth century. Its interior is an unusually complete example of Georgian church design. It was designated a Category A listed building in 1971.

The church's burial grounds contain tombstones from the seventeenth to the nineteenth centuries. One of its burial enclosures has on its east face an ornately carved memorial for William Gordon of Greenlaw, which is itself independently listed at Category A.

As of 2022 the church is still in regular use as a place of worship, and its former hearse house is owned by a community group and used as an information centre.

== Description ==
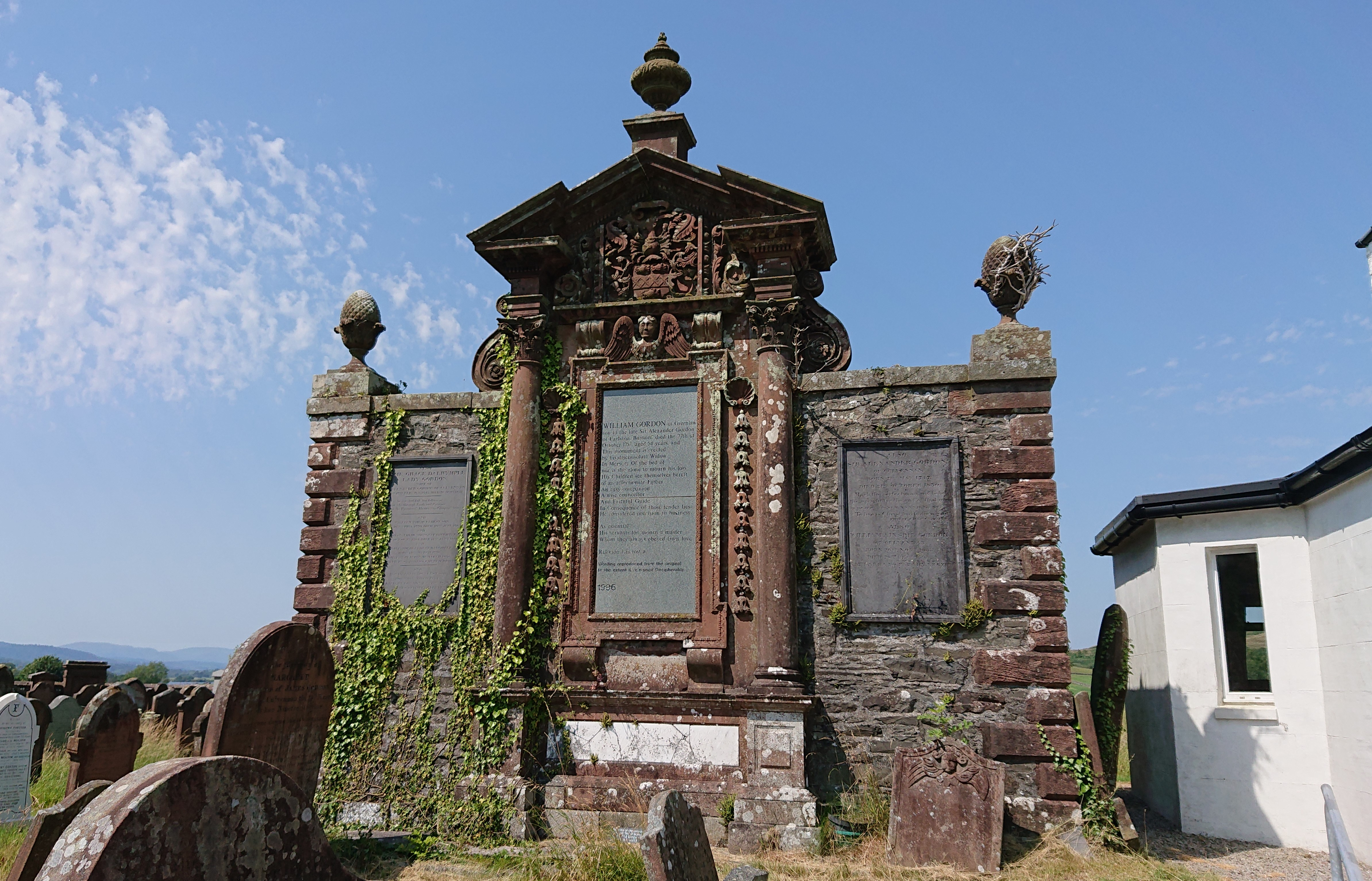
The memorial to William Gordon of Greenlaw

Crossmichael Parish Church and its burial ground lie on a knoll at the north end of Crossmichael's Main Street. Built of painted whinstone rubble, it has a piend-roofed main block, with an extension (also piend-roofed) in the middle of the north wall, resulting in a T-plan. In the middle of the south wall is a slender circular tower, with a conical slate roof. It has tall lancet windows.

The church retains an unusually complete Georgian interior dating from the eighteenth and early nineteenth centuries. There are raised galleries on Tuscan columns, and box pews, some named for important local heritors including the Gordons of Kenmure and the Copelands of Danevale. Two of the windows have stained glass: the west window, by Heaton, Butler and Bayne, is of 1898 and depicts the Risen Lord; the east window, entitled Our Lord stilling the Storm, is of circa 1920.

The church is surrounded by a burial ground, containing tombstones from the seventeenth to the nineteenth centuries. To the west of church is a burial enclosure for the Gordons of Culvennan. On its east wall is an ornately carved memorial to William Gordon of Greenlaw (died 1757), erected by 'his disconsolate widow'. The memorial is believed to have been carved by self-taught sculptor S. Rae.

The church's hearse house, at the bottom of the knoll on its west side on the level of the street, has been converted into a local history centre.

== History ==
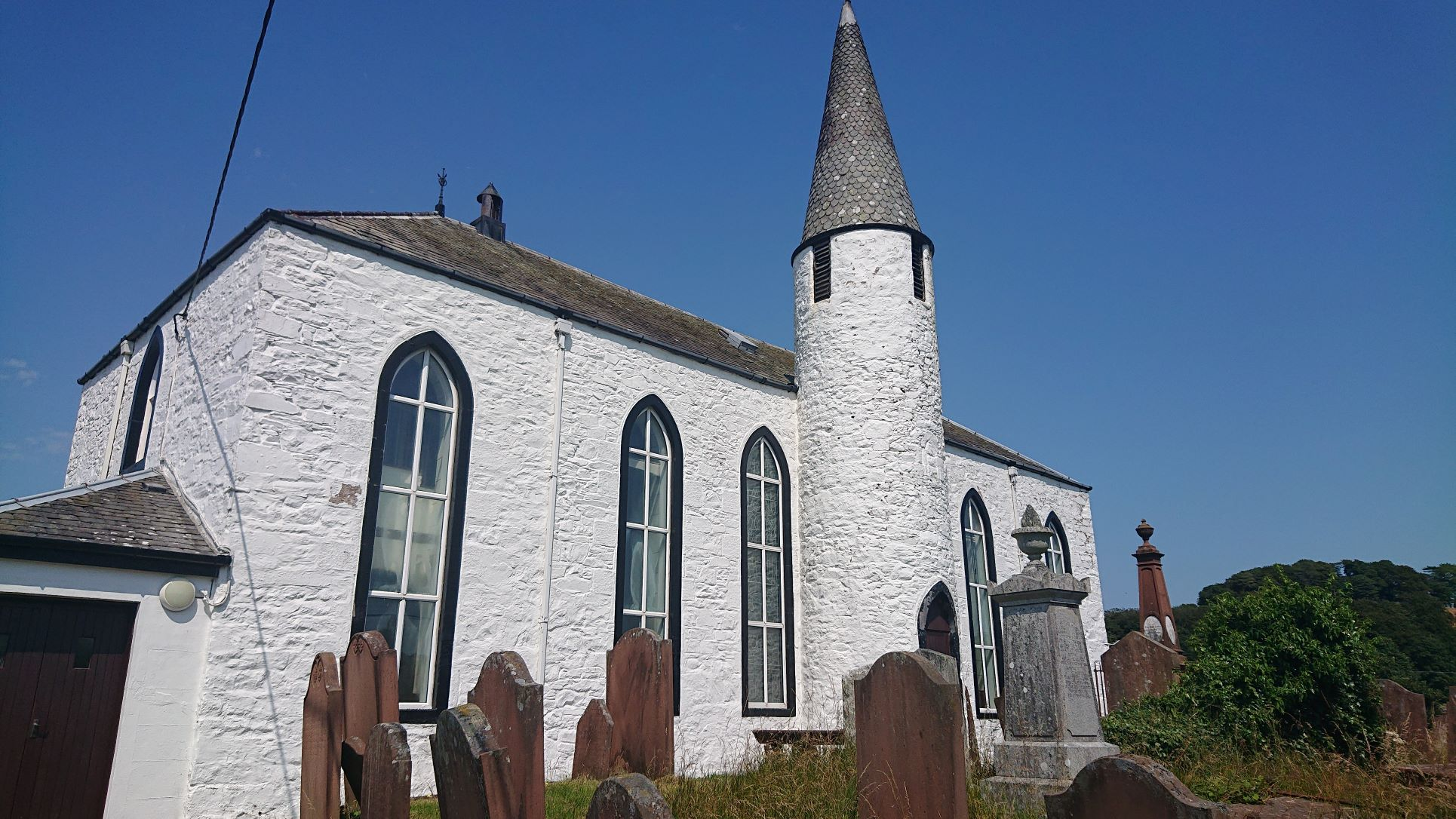
The church viewed from the south

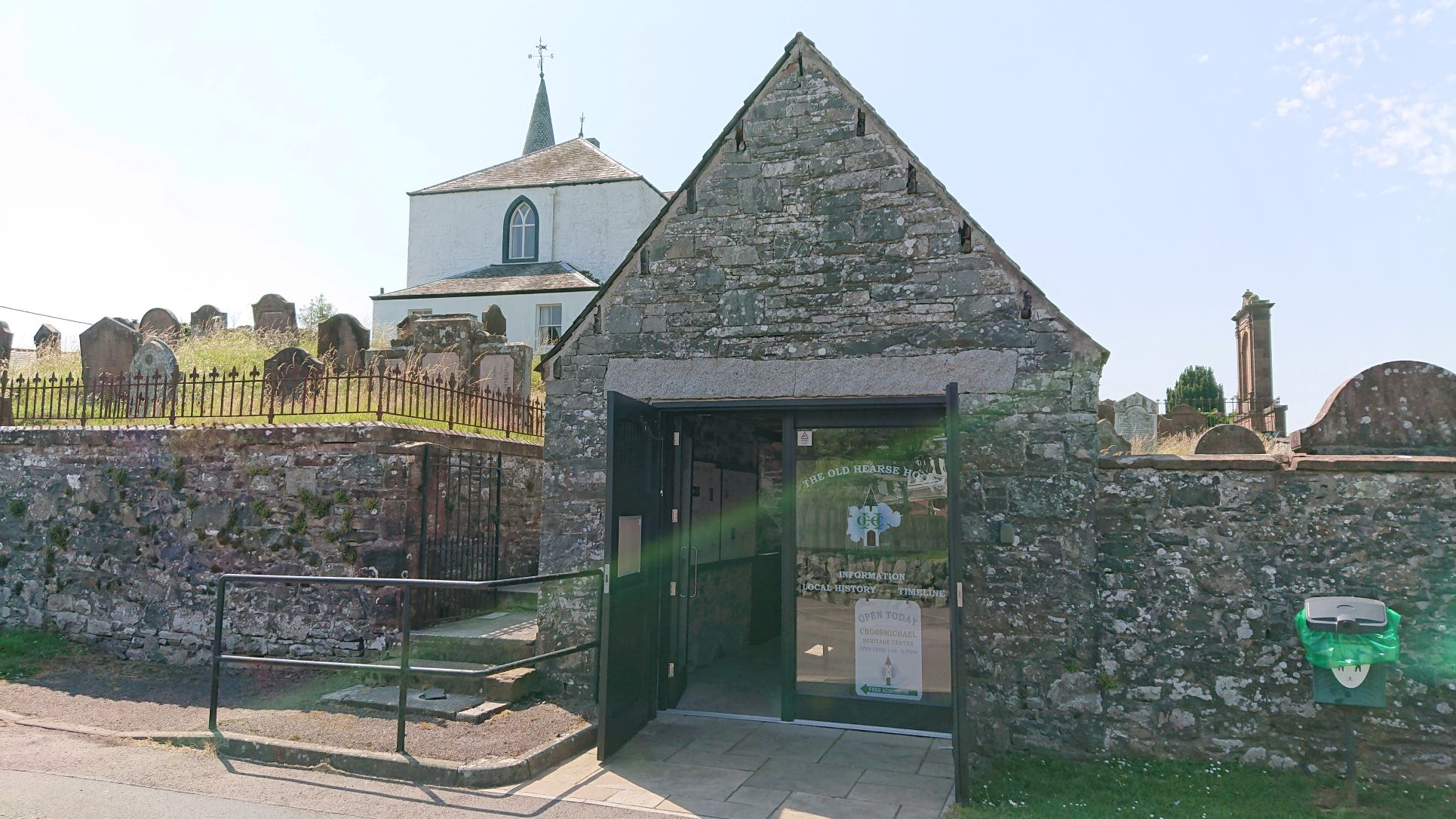
The Old Hearse House information centre

The knoll on which the church stands is probably the site of an ancient place of worship. The oldest part of the current building is the tower, which is seventeenth-century, possibly as old as the 1611 bell (made by John Burgerhuys) that hangs in it. The church's main block was built in 1749–1751, on the site of an older building. In 1822–1823, David McLellan designed and built the north extension; in 1824–1825, John Graham and William Laurie heightened the tower; the tower's present conical roof was most probably added while alterations were being made in 1880–81 by John Starforth.

In 1971, the church was designated a Category A listed building. In 1990, the Gordon memorial was given its own separate designation at Category A.

In 2018, Dumfries and Galloway Council sold the church's hearse house to the Crossmichael Community Trust for a nominal fee, so that it would be turned into an exhibition space. In September 2019, the building was opened by historians Ted Cowan and Lizanne Henderson.

As of 2022, the church remains in use as an active place of worship.

== Sources ==
- "Community Led 'Crossmichael Heritage Centre & Living History Project' Launches". Dumfries and Galloway! What's Going On?. 17 September 2019.
- "Crossmichael Church". Scotland's Churches Trust. 24 September 2017.
- "Crossmichael Church and Gordon Memorial". Places of Worship in Scotland. Scottish Church Heritage Research Ltd.
- Gifford, John (1996). The Buildings of Scotland:Dumfries and Galloway. London: Penguin. ISBN 0140-71067-1.
- Gillespie, Stuart (20 February 2018). "Crossmichael's old hearse house to be turned into community exhibition space". The Daily Record.
- Historic Environment Scotland. "Crossmichael Parish Church and Churchyard (Church of Scotland) (Category A Listed Building LB3698)".
- Historic Environment Scotland. "Crossmichael Church Gordon Memorial (Category A Listed Building LB3699)".
- Hume, John R (2000). Dumfries and Galloway: An Illustrated Architectural Guide. The Rutland Press. ISBN 1-873-190-344.
- Hume, John R. (2005). Scotland's Best Churches. Edinburgh: Edinburgh University Press. ISBN 0748621792.
