= Duchess Bridge =

19th-century cast-iron footbridge in Dumfries and Galloway, Scotland

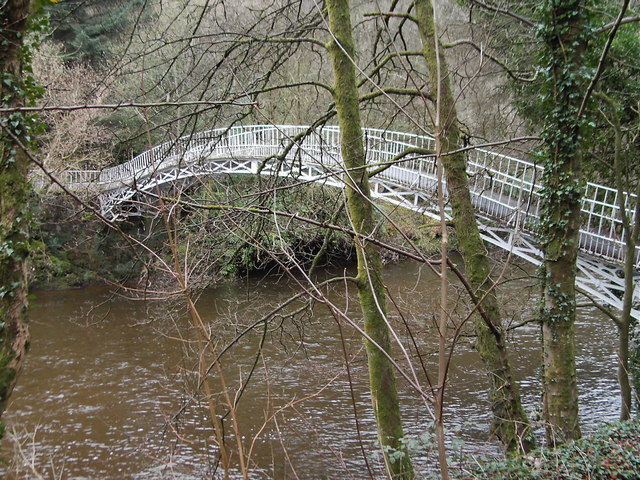
- Duchess Bridge
- Coordinates: 55.15727°N 3.01234°W
- OS grid reference: NY 35593 85239
- Carries: Footpath
- Crosses: River Esk, Dumfries and Galloway
- Locale: Dumfries and Galloway

Characteristics
- Design: Arch
- Material: Cast iron
- Total length: 101 feet (31 m)
- Width: 6 feet (1.8 m)
- No. of spans: 1

History
- Designer: William Keir, Junior
- Built: 1813

Listed Building – Category A
- Official name: Langholm Lodge, Duchess Bridge (over River Esk)
- Designated: 2 August 1971
- Reference no.: LB9734

Location
- Interactive map of Duchess Bridge

The Duchess Bridge is a cast iron footbridge over the River Esk in Dumfries and Galloway, Scotland. It was built for Charles Montagu-Scott, 4th Duke of Buccleuch by William Keir Junior of Millholm to replace a dilapidated wooden bridge in the grounds of his mansion Langholm Lodge, which has since been demolished. The bridge, which is probably the oldest surviving iron bridge in Scotland, is still in use as part of a public walkway through the grounds of the estate, and has been designated a Category A listed building.

== History ==
Although iron had long been in use in China as a material for building bridges, it was not until 1778 that the first iron bridge in the Western world was constructed at Coalbrookdale in England. The first iron bridge in Scotland is thought to have been built on Islay, and was said to have already been standing for a number of years by 1811, but the Duchess Bridge is probably the oldest surviving Scottish example.

Langholm Lodge was a mansion built by James Playfair for Henry Scott, the 3rd Duke of Buccleuch between 1786 and 1787. William Keir of Millholm was employed by the duke in the 1770s to manage and improve the estate the house was to be built upon, and his son William Keir Junior was also employed there in later years. Scott died in 1812, but was survived by his wife, Elizabeth Scott who lived until in 1827, and was succeeded as duke by their son Charles Montagu-Scott. In May 1813, the younger Keir reported that the wooden bridge that was named for the dowager duchess, that spanned the Esk, was in a poor condition. He estimated the cost of repairing the existing structure would be around £160, but that if he were to retain the existing roadway and railings but have new ribs cast in iron, the cost would be reduced to £140. The new duke gave him the go ahead to make preparations for this work, but having entered into correspondence with an iron foundry in Workington, Keir became convinced that it would be better to build a new bridge entirely of iron. He wrote to the duke's secretary in July, writing:

If the bridge was altogether made of Iron, the expense would be from £210 to £220 and I think it is a pity not to do it, it will look so remarkably light & neat, & His Grace I am convinced would not regret it afterwards, but I doubt much if He will be satisfied with the appearance of the structure, if the wooden railing is put on, it will I fear have a heavy appearance on the light Iron Ribs.

The Duke was convinced, and in August 1813 gave the go ahead for the work to be carried out, requesting that it should all be completed by September. The bridge was duly built at the foundry to designs drawn up by Keir, and transported by boat from Workington to the mouth of the Solway Firth, and as far up the Esk as possible, before being installed on the abutments of the previous bridge.

Langholm Lodge was demolished in 1953, but its ornamental grounds survive, and the bridge is still in use as part of a public walkway through them. It was designated a Category B listed building in 1971, and upgraded to Category A in 1988.

== Description ==
The Duchess Bridge's segmental arch is constructed of latticed girders which morph into long spandrels. The girders rest on two ashlar abutments. The balusters of the parapet widen out at either end, and are tied to the projecting deck of the bridge by iron scrolls. The arch has a span of approximately 101 feet (31 m), rises 8 feet (2.4 m), and has a walkway 6 feet (1.8 m) wide.

John R. Hume, the former chief inspector of historic buildings for Historic Scotland, described the bridge in 2000 as "early, fine and remarkably slender".

== See also ==
- List of bridges in Scotland

== Sources ==
- Historic Environment Scotland. "Langholm Lodge, Duchess Bridge (over River Esk) (Category A Listed Building LB9734)".
- Gifford, John (1996). The Buildings of Scotland:Dumfries and Galloway. London: Penguin. ISBN 0140-71067-1.
- Hume, John R (2000). Dumfries and Galloway: An Illustrated Architectural Guide. The Rutland Press. ISBN 1-873-190-344.
- MacKechnie, Aonghus (2014). "Duchess Bridge, Langholm: An Early Scottish Cast-Iron Footbridge — Made in England" (PDF). Transactions of the Dumfriesshire and Galloway Natural History and Antiquarian Society. 88. Archived from the original on 3 June 2021.
- Cokayne, G. E.; Gibbs, Vicary; Doubleday, H. A.; White, Geoffrey H.; Warrand, Duncan; de Walden, Howard (2000). The Complete Peerage of England, Scotland, Ireland, Great Britain and the United Kingdom, Extant, Extinct or Dormant, new ed., Scotland 1910–1959; reprint in 6 volumes; volume II. Gloucester, U.K.: Alan Sutton Publishing.
