= Ardwall House =

Mansion in Scotland

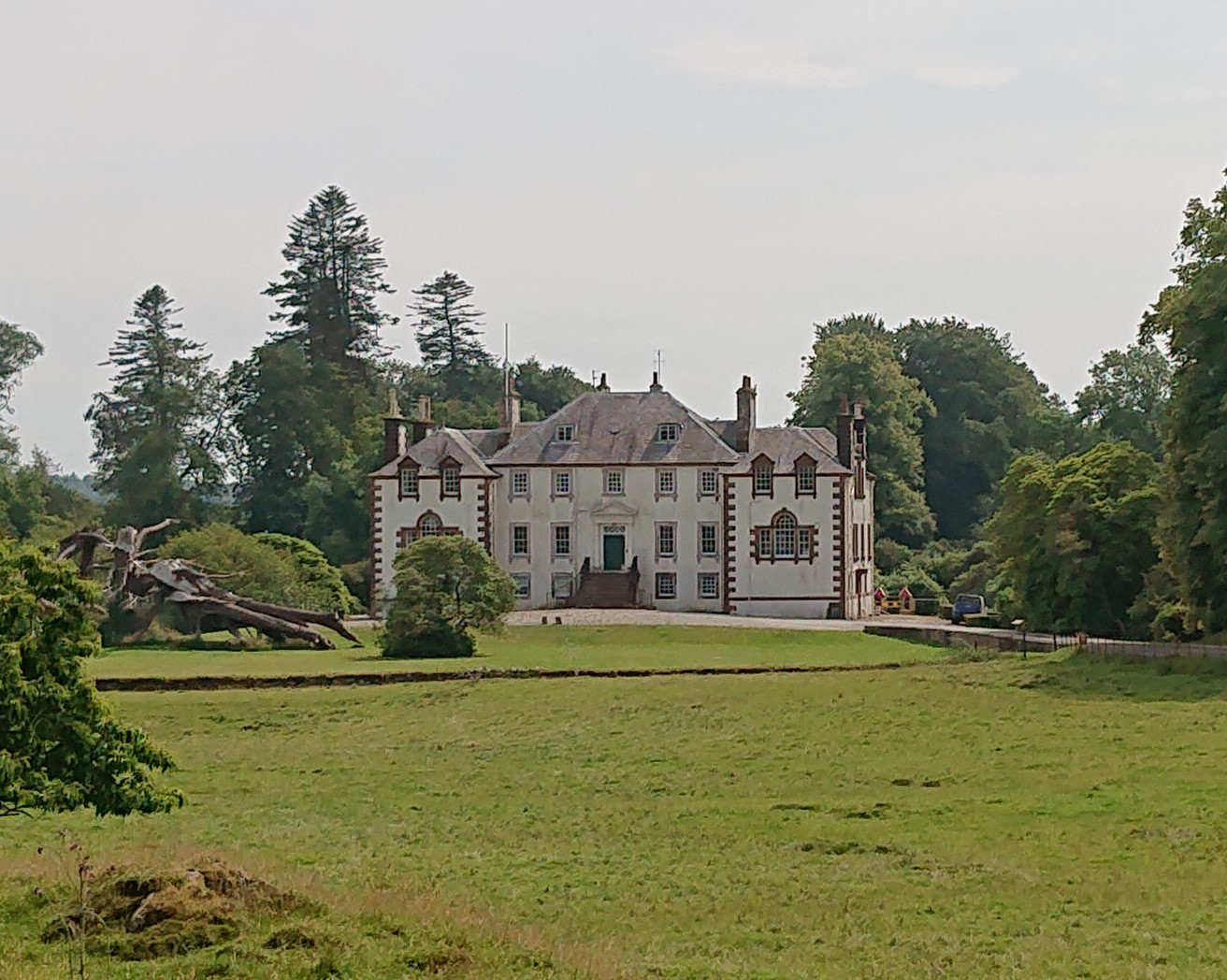

- Location of the house within Dumfries and Galloway
- 54°52′02″N 4°12′44″W
- Type: Mansion
- Location: Borgue, Dumfries and Galloway

Listed Building – Category A
- Official name: Ardwall House
- Designated: 4 November 1971
- Reference no.: LB3302

Ardwall House is an eighteenth-century mansion near Gatehouse of Fleet in Dumfries and Galloway, Scotland. Built in 1762 for the McCullochs of Ardwall, it was extended in 1895 with the addition of pavilion wings to either side of the house. It was designated a Category A listed building in 1971. It is still in use, and remains in the hands of the McCulloch family.

In the garden of the house is a Pictish stone slab with a carved Celtic cross, which was discovered on nearby Ardwall Isle.

== Description ==
Ardwall House is a classical mansion, with a five-bay central block, to which has been added a pair of pavilion wings giving the overall structure an H-plan. The central block has two storeys above an exposed basement level. Its walls are harled, with red sandstone detailing. In the centre of the north facade is the main entrance, reached via a curved stone stairway, and surrounded by a Roman Doric aedicule, with carvings depicting alternating rosettes and bucrania.

The south face of the building, opening onto the garden, is also of five bays, and has a central round-arched door with a projecting keystone reached by a balustraded flight of stone stairs. A stone plaque in the wall records that the building was founded on 6 April 1762.

The pavilion wings have identical elevations to front and rear, each with a Venetian window in the centre at the level of the piano nobile. The aesthetic qualities of these windows have been criticised: John R. Hume wrote that they "rather over-egg the pudding", and John Gifford observed that "[t]he result is rather less tactful than was intended". The interior of the building retains much of the building's original eighteenth-century fittings, including cornicing, arched stairways, panelling and fireplaces.

In the garden to the south-east of the house is a Pictish stone slab, dating from the early mediaeval period, with a Celtic cross carved into one of its faces, which was found on nearby Ardwall Isle and taken to serve as a garden ornament.

== History ==
The house was built in 1762, to serve as the main residence of the McCullochs of Ardwall. In the late nineteenth century, Edinburgh architects Thomas Greenshields Leadbetter and James McLellan Fairley added a pair of flanking pavilions to the original house, and performed minor alterations to the original block including the addition of the stairway to the entrance on the south side, and the lengthening of some of the ground floor windows.

In 1945, one of the pavilion wings was badly damaged by fire, necessitating the replacement of the roof.

In 1971, the house was designated a Category A listed building. It is still in use, and remains in the hands of the McCulloch family.

== Sources ==
- "Ardwall House". Canmore. Historic Environment Scotland.
- "Ardwall House and Cross". Places of Worship in Scotland. Scottish Church Heritage Research Ltd.
- Gifford, John (1996). The Buildings of Scotland:Dumfries and Galloway. London: Penguin. ISBN 0140-71067-1.
- Historic Environment Scotland. "Ardwall House (Category A Listed Building LB3302)".
- Hume, John R (2000). Dumfries and Galloway: An Illustrated Architectural Guide. Edinburgh: The Rutland Press. ISBN 1-873-190-344.
