= Kirkdale Bridge =

18th-century stone bridge in Dumfries and Galloway, Scotland

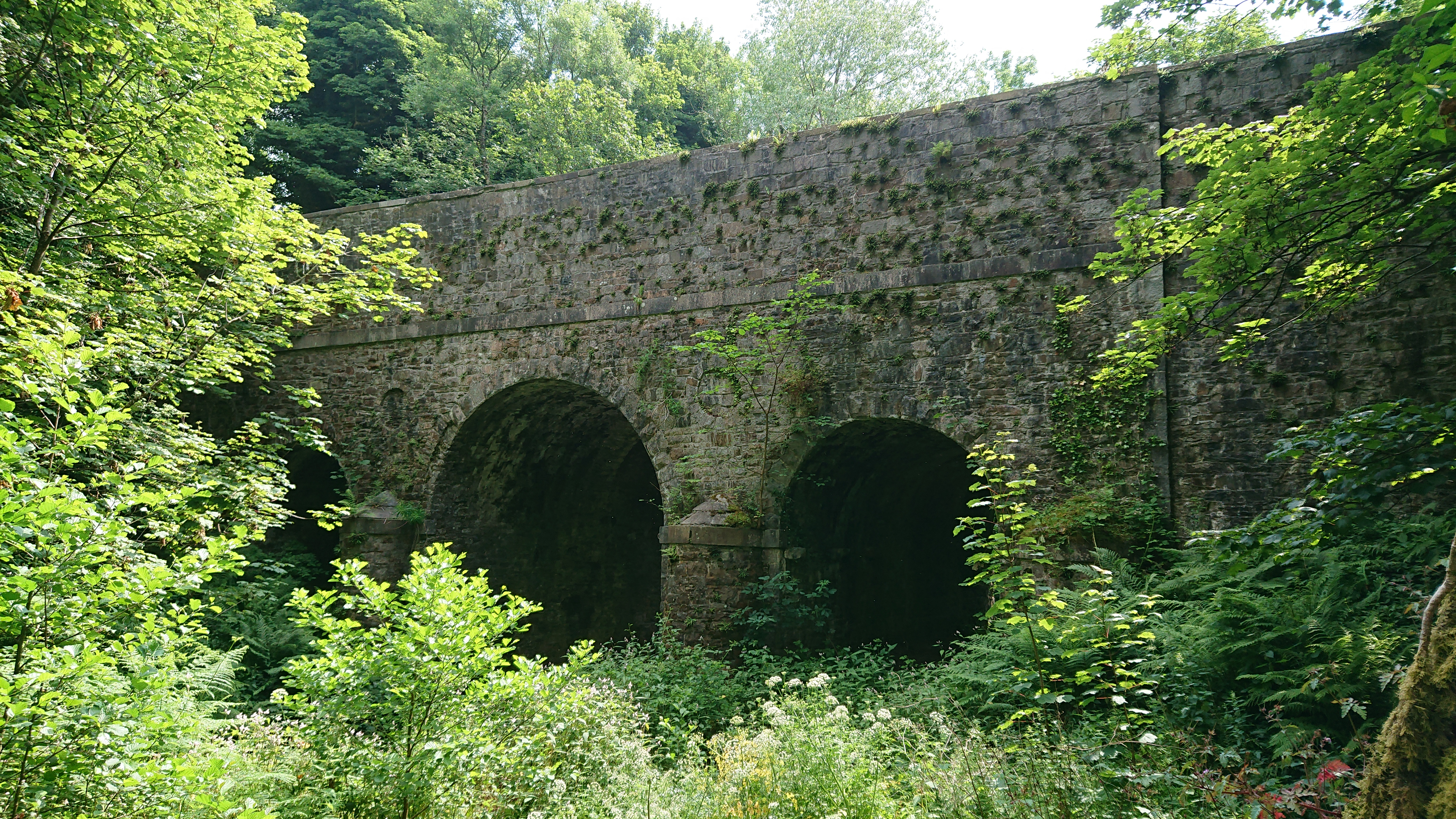
- The north elevation of the bridge
- Coordinates: 54.8506°N 4.3110°W
- Carries: Footpath, formerly road bridge
- Crosses: Kirkdale Burn
- Locale: Dumfries and Galloway

Characteristics
- Design: Arch
- Material: Stone
- No. of spans: 3

History
- Designer: Robert Adam
- Construction end: 1787

Listed Building – Category A
- Official name: Kirkdale Bridge
- Designated: 4 November 1971
- Reference no.: LB13137

Location
- Interactive map of Kirkdale Bridge

Kirkdale Bridge is a bridge over the Kirkdale Burn in the parish of Kirkmabreck, between Gatehouse of Fleet and Creetown in Dumfries and Galloway, Scotland. It was built for Sir Samuel Hannay, based on designs drawn up by Robert Adam, but the execution was much simpler than Adam had originally envisaged, probably to reduce the construction costs.

The bridge was designated a Category A listed building in 1971. Several other buildings on the estate, also designed by Adam, are also listed as Category A, in separate designations.

== History ==
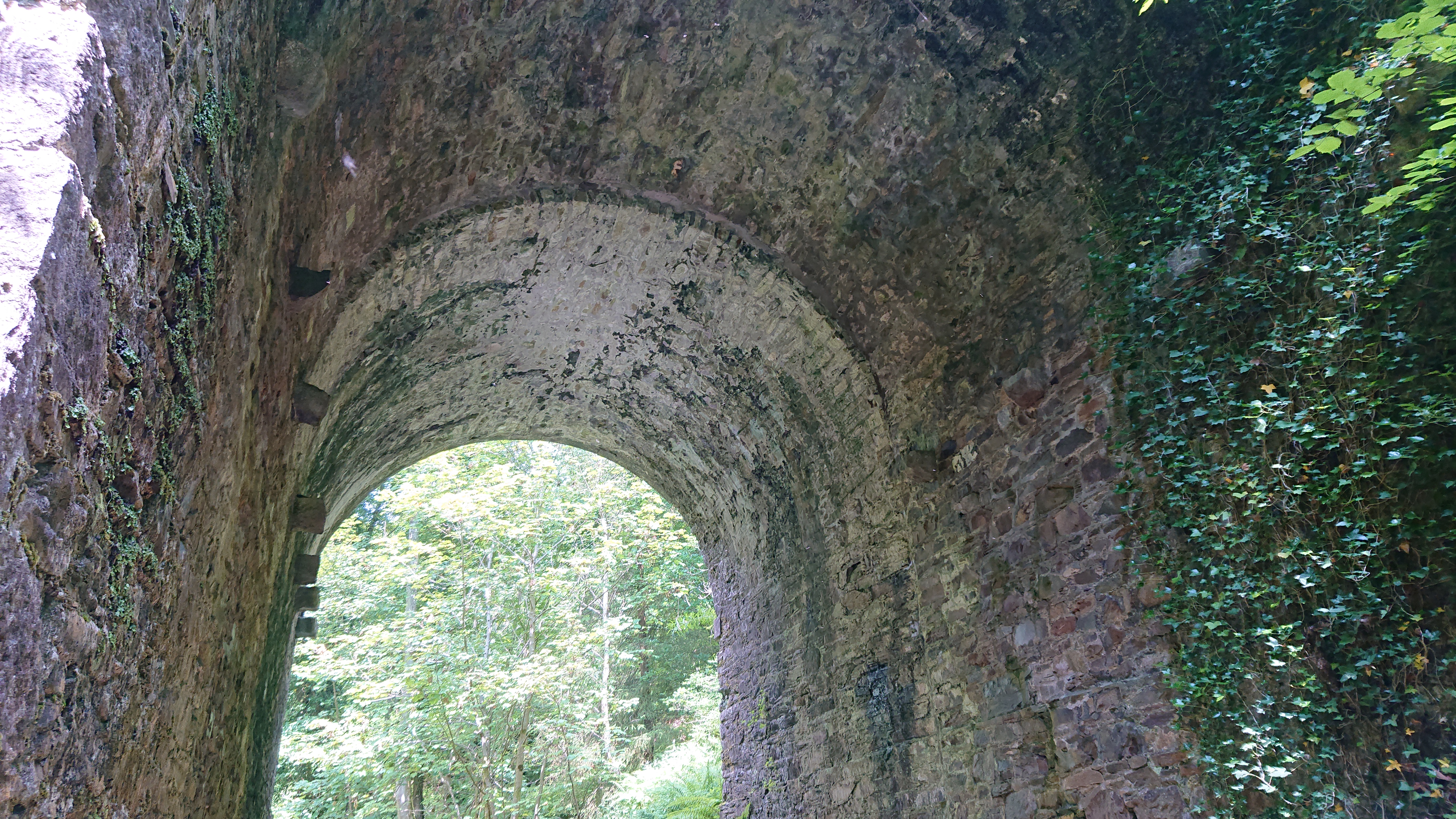
A step in the masonry of the arches shows the join where McGowan's southern extension meets the original bridge

Sir Samuel Hannay, a laird from Wigtonshire who had made a substantial fortune as a merchant in London, engaged Robert Adam to design Kirkdale House, and a series of other buildings on his estate at Kirkdale in the 1780s. Amongst these was a bridge to carry a road over the steep ravine of the Kirkdale Burn. Adam drew up plans for an elaborate three-span bridge, featuring swags and sphinxes, to be executed in ashlar masonry. The plans are now held by the Sir John Soane's Museum in London; the bridge as it was actually built however, around 1787, was a substantially simplified version of Adam's design, built largely of rubble and with many of the finer features missing, presumably to save money.

The bridge was originally 6.1 metres (20 ft) wide, but was widened in 1857 by William McGowan to accommodate a wider roadway by extending the structure to the south to give a width of 12.8 metres (42 ft). McGowan rebuilt the south elevation in the same manner as the original eighteenth-century bridge.

The bridge is no longer open to road traffic, but it is still in use as a footbridge. It was designated a Category A listed building in 1971; Kirkdale House, and several other buildings on the estate thought to have been designed by Adams, were separately listed.

== Description ==
The bridge is mostly built of rubble, but has a band course of granite ashlar. There are three spans, with round arches; the outer two arches, each spanning a footpath running along the ravine, are approximately 3.8 metres (12 ft) wide, and the central arch over the burn itself spans 6 metres (20 ft). The arches have rubble voussoirs and, in the spandrels between them, rubble oculi.

John R. Hume, the former chief inspector of historic buildings for Historic Scotland, describes the bridge as "distinctly plain and workmanlike, though handsomely proportioned".

== See also ==
- List of bridges in Scotland

== Sources ==
- Historic Environment Scotland. "Kirkdale Bridge (Category A Listed Building LB13137)".
- Historic Environment Scotland. "Kirkdale House and Sundial (Category A Listed Building LB13138)".
- Historic Environment Scotland. "Kirkdale Mausoleum and Kirkdale Kirk and Graveyard Walls (Category A Listed Building LB13139)".
- Historic Environment Scotland. "Kirkdale Steadings and Slaughterhouse (Category A Listed Building LB13140)".
- Gifford, John (1996). The Buildings of Scotland:Dumfries and Galloway. London: Penguin. ISBN 0140-71067-1.
- Hume, John R (2000). Dumfries and Galloway: An Illustrated Architectural Guide. The Rutland Press. ISBN 1-873-190-344.
