= List of listed buildings in Crossmichael, Dumfries and Galloway =

This is a list of listed buildings in the parish of Crossmichael in Dumfries and Galloway, Scotland.

== List ==
Name	Location	Date listed	Grid ref. (Note: Sometimes known as OSGB36, the grid reference (where provided) is based on the British national grid reference system used by the Ordnance Survey. • "Guide to National Grid". Ordnance Survey. • "Get-a-map". Ordnance Survey.)	Geo-coordinates	Notes	LB number (Note: Historic Environment Scotland assign a unique alphanumeric identifier to each designated site in Scotland, for listed buildings this always begins with "LB", for example "LB12345".)	Image
Gerranton				54°57′56″N 3°54′41″W	Category B	3705	Upload Photo
Auchendolly House And Steadings				54°59′34″N 3°55′34″W	Category B	3695	Upload Photo
Crossmichael Church Gordon Memorial				54°58′52″N 3°59′10″W	Category A	3699	Upload Photo
Culgruff House Hotel				54°58′45″N 3°58′24″W	Category B	3703	Upload Photo
Clarebrand, Burnbrae Including Ancillary Building And Boundary Wall				54°58′15″N 3°56′45″W	Category C(S)	51614	Upload Photo
Claycroft				54°57′08″N 3°56′56″W	Category B	3697	Upload Photo
Crossmichael Parish Church And Churchyard (Church Of Scotland)				54°58′52″N 3°59′11″W	Category A	3698	Upload another image
Urr Valley Hotel (Formerly Ernespie House) Ancillary Structures Comprising Dovecot, Water Tower, Walled Garden And Garden Terraces				54°57′02″N 3°54′51″W	Category B	49593	Upload Photo
Glenlochar Bridge				54°57′33″N 3°58′54″W	Category A	3706	Upload Photo
Greenlaw House				54°57′31″N 3°56′50″W	Category A	3708	Upload Photo
Blackpark Farmhouse				54°56′42″N 3°56′54″W	Category B	3696	Upload Photo
Danevale Park Stables				54°58′02″N 3°58′38″W	Category B	3704	Upload Photo
Glenlochar, And Gatepiers				54°57′43″N 3°58′41″W	Category B	3707	Upload Photo

== Key ==
The scheme for classifying buildings in Scotland is:

- Category A: "buildings of national or international importance, either architectural or historic; or fine, little-altered examples of some particular period, style or building type."
- Category B: "buildings of regional or more than local importance; or major examples of some particular period, style or building type, which may have been altered."
- Category C: "buildings of local importance; lesser examples of any period, style, or building type, as originally constructed or moderately altered; and simple traditional buildings which group well with other listed buildings."

In March 2016 there were 47,288 listed buildings in Scotland. Of these, 8% were Category A, and 50% were Category B, with the remaining 42% being Category C.
