= Girthon Old Parish Church =

Ruined church in Dumfries and Galloway, Scotland

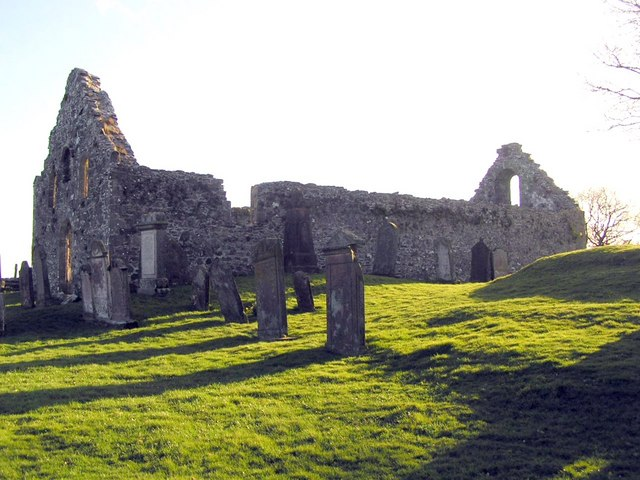
- The church viewed from the north
- Girthon Old Parish Church
- 54°51′21″N 4°10′26″W
- Location: Girthon, near Gatehouse of Fleet
- Country: Scotland
- Denomination: Church of Scotland

History
- Founded: Around 1620

Architecture
- Functional status: Unused since 1818
- Heritage designation: Category A listed building (burial grounds), Scheduled monument (remains of church)
- Designated: 1971, 1999

Girthon Old Parish Church is a ruined ecclesiastical building in Girthon, near Gatehouse of Fleet in Dumfries and Galloway. Built around 1620 on the foundations of a mediaeval church, and incorporating some of the fabric of the older building in its eastern and southern walls, it served as the parish church for Girthon until 1818 when a new church was built for the parish in Gatehouse of Fleet, after which it was abandoned and allowed to fall into disrepair. The church itself has been designated a scheduled monument, and the churchyard a Category A listed building.

== History ==
Girthon Old Parish Church was most probably built around 1620, on the foundations of an older mediaeval church, and it retains some of the fabric of the original building in the gable of its east end, and in some of the stonework in the south wall. It remained in use as the parish church for Girthon until a new church for the parish (which is still in use as of 2021) was built in Gatehouse of Fleet in 1818, after which it was allowed to fall into disrepair.

The church and its churchyard were designated a Category A listed building in 1971. In 1999, the church building itself separately designated a scheduled monument; the church was excluded from the listed building designation in 2015.

== Description ==
The now-roofless church is rectangular in plan, measuring 21.9 metres (72 ft) by 7 metres (23 ft) wide. It has round-arched doors and windows, and high in its north wall is a doorway that would have given access to a raised gallery, traces of which survive at the eastern end of the building. Also surviving in the eastern end of the south wall is a late mediaeval ogee-curved piscina.

The building stands in a churchyard, with memorial stones from the seventeenth, eighteenth and nineteenth centuries. The nearby house, Girthon Kirk, is recorded as having been built as a manse by Patrick Blain and Samuel Kennan between 1738 and 1739, but John R. Hume contends that its original construction date must be earlier than this, and that the thickness of its walls and the arrangement of its narrow windows suggest that it is a seventeenth-century building that was renovated in the eighteenth century.

== Sources ==
- Historic Environment Scotland. "Girthon Old Parish Church (Scheduled Monument SM7868)".
- Historic Environment Scotland. "Girthon Old Kirk Churchyard, excluding Scheduled Monument No 7868 'Girthon Old Parish Church', Girthon (Category A Listed Building LB9859)".
- Gifford, John (1996). The Buildings of Scotland:Dumfries and Galloway. London: Penguin. ISBN 0140-71067-1.
- Hume, John R (2000). Dumfries and Galloway: An Illustrated Architectural Guide. The Rutland Press. ISBN 1-873-190-344.
