= John Starforth =

Architect

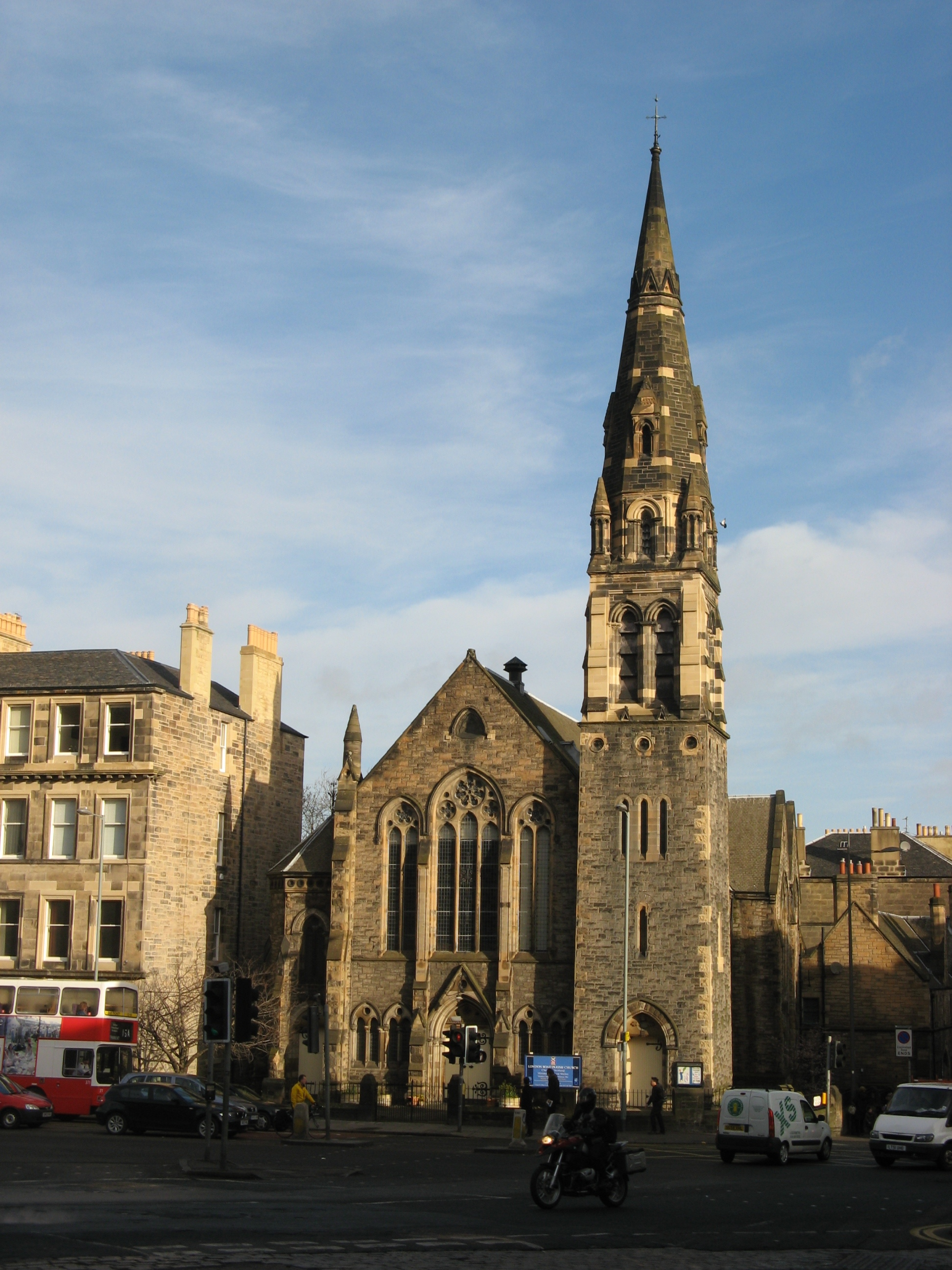
London Road Parish Church, Edinburgh

John Starforth (1822–1898) was an English-born architect and architectural author associated almost solely with work in Scotland, mainly working in Lothian, Dumfries & Galloway, and the Scottish Borders.

== Life ==
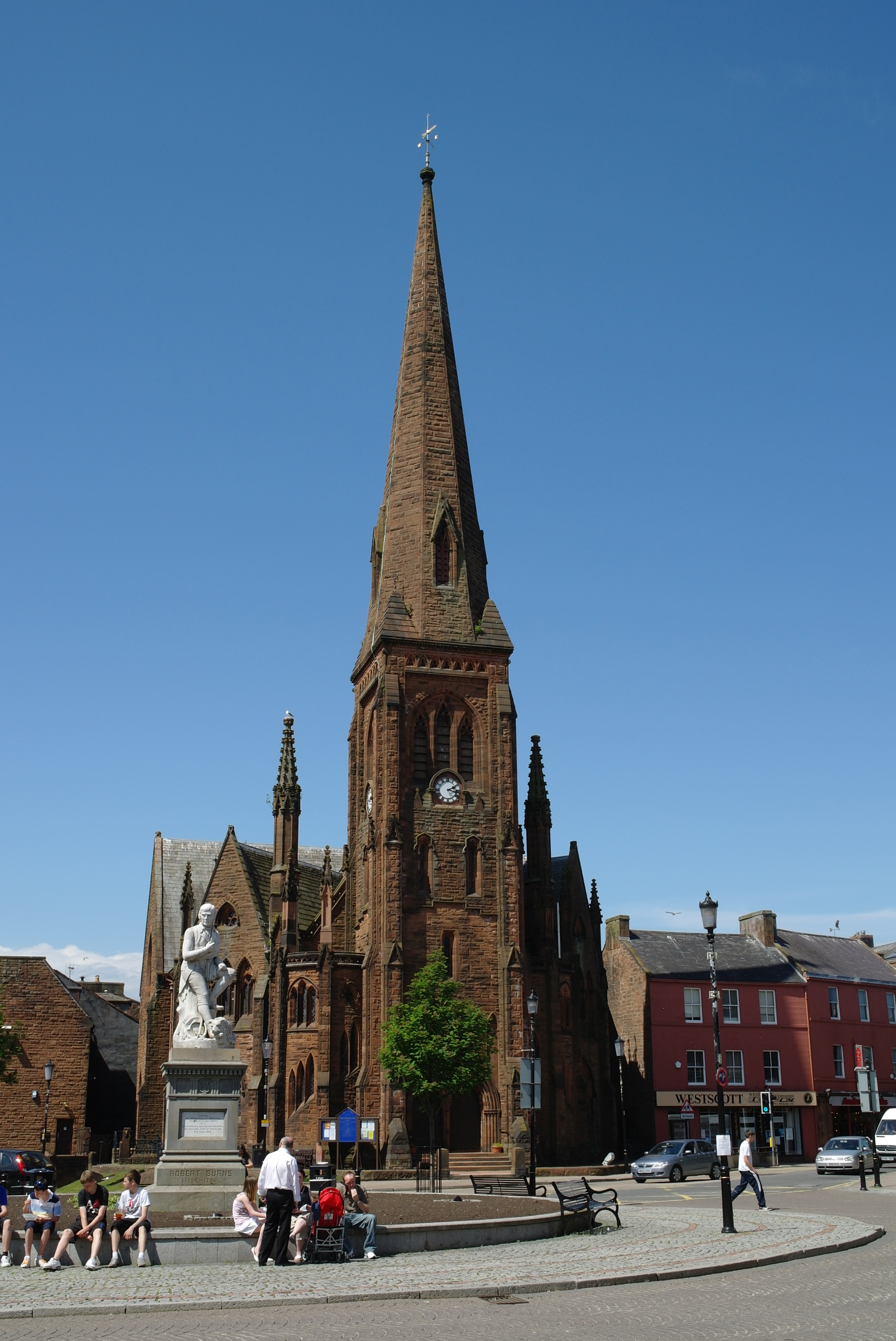
Greyfriars Church in Dumfries

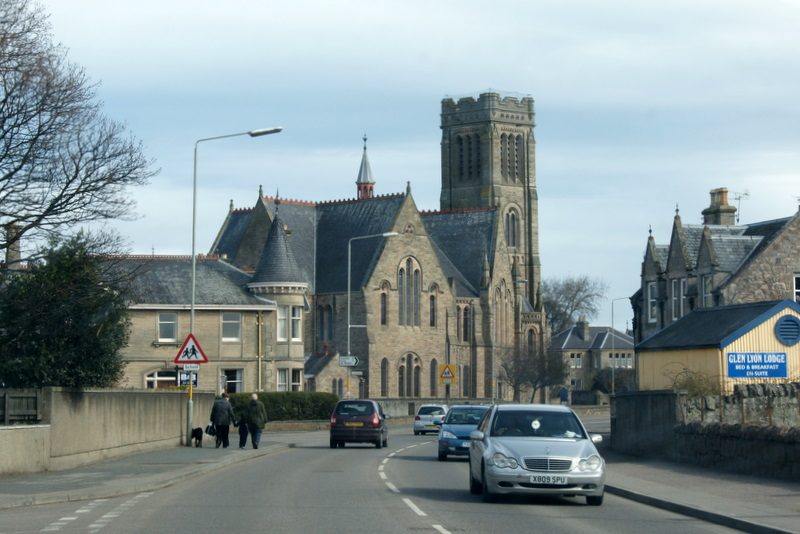
Old Parish Church, Nairn

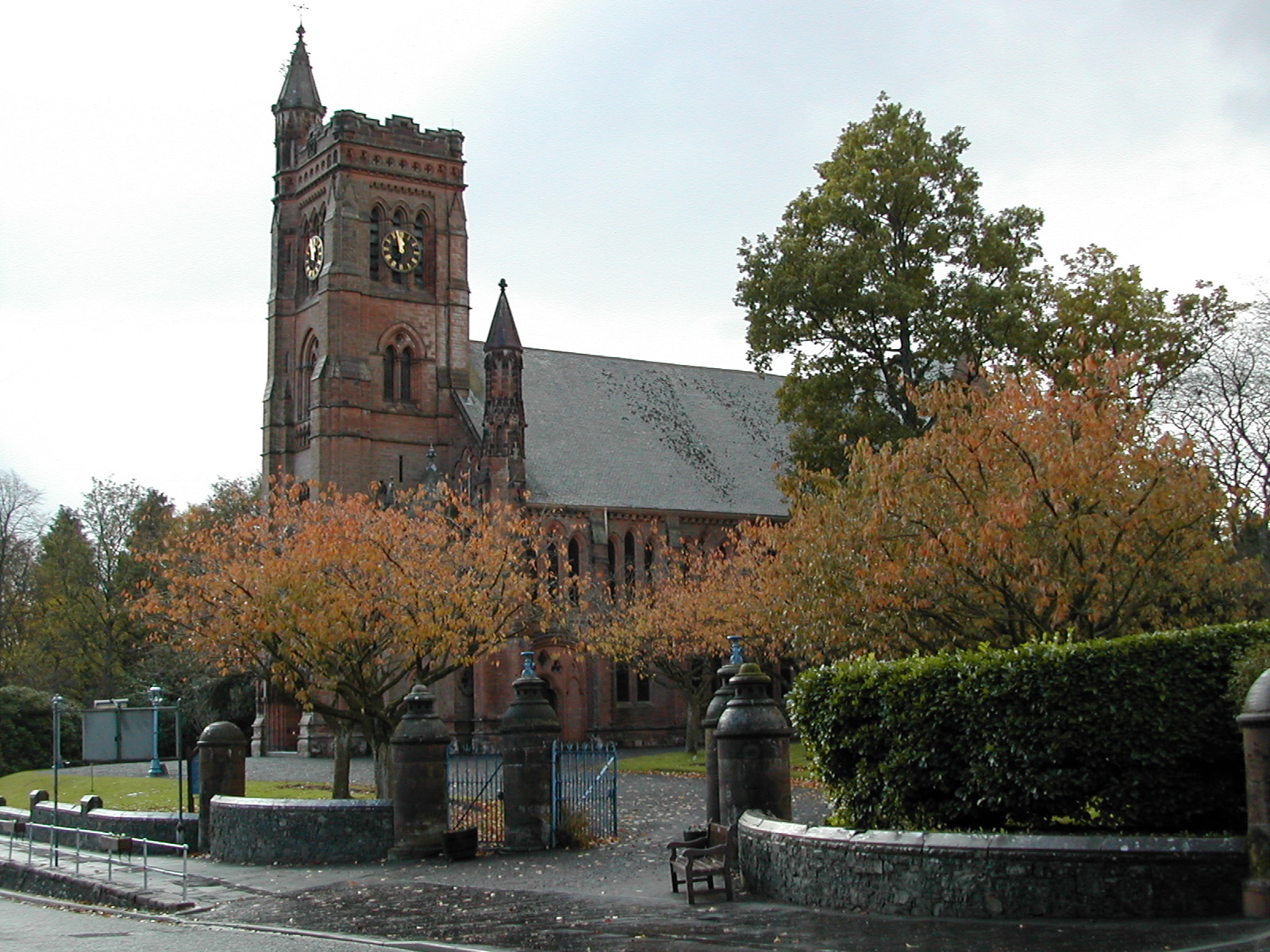
Moffat church

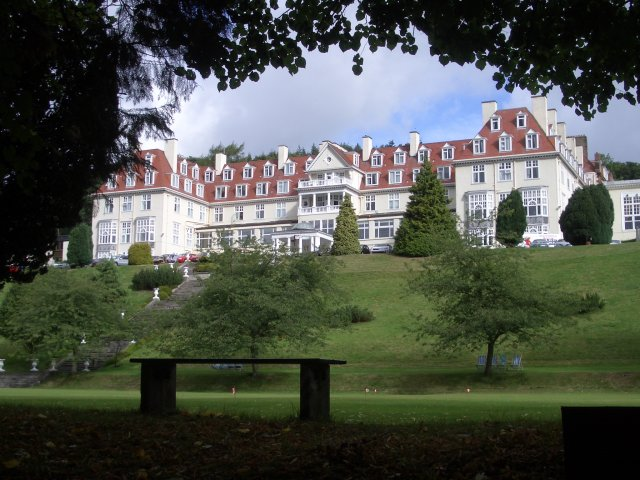
Peebles Hydro

He was born in the town of Auckland near Durham in northern England, in July 1822 the son of John Henry Starforth or Starford, and his wife Elizabeth Moor. He was apprenticed as an architect under Thomas Hamilton in the 1830s, based in Edinburgh (probably aged 14). Around 1840 he moved to the firm of Burn & Bryce, staying with David Bryce when William Burn left to set up in London in 1844.

He set up an independent practice around 1850, specialising in churches and country villas and farmsteads. In 1864 he entered the competition for the Scottish National Albert Memorial (now in Charlotte Square). Although unsuccessful his drawings were displayed in the 1886 Edinburgh Exhibition on The Meadows.

He died of a heart attack whilst walking on Princes Street, to his home at 37 York Place in Edinburgh's New Town, on 18 May 1898.

== Family ==
He was married to Helen Henderson (d.1916). They had two daughters and three sons, including Robert H. Starforth, who continued his father's architectural practice but was of lesser note. Helen moved to Ayr following her husband's death.

== Works of Note ==
See

- Patriothall, Stockbridge, Edinburgh (1859)
- Greyfriars Church, Dumfries (1865)
- Coltbridge School, Edinburgh (1868)
- Dumfries and Galloway Royal Infirmary (1869)
- Trinity UP Church, Greenock (1869)
- Peebles Free Church (1871)
- Design for Villa Residences (1866)
- London Road Church, Edinburgh (1874)
- Remodelling of Cummertrees Parish Church (1875)
- Greenock Poorhouse and Asylum (1875)
- Tranent school (1876)
- Knox Academy (1877)
- Peebles Hydro (1878)
- UP Church, Summerside Street, Edinburgh (1878) (demolished 1977)
- UP Church, Eyre Place, Edinburgh (1879) (demolished)
- Alterations at Crossmichael Parish Church (1880–1881)
- Moffat Church, plus hall and manse (1882–5)
- UP Church and Hall, Kelso, Scottish Borders (1885)
- Chapel at Craigdarroch House (1889)
- Old Parish Church, Nairn (1893) final completion (1897) overseen by Honeyman and Keppie.
- Berwick Infirmary Northumberland (1872-4)

== Publications ==
- The Architecture of the Farm (1853)
- Villa Residences and Farm Architecture (1865)
- Designs for Villa Residences (1866)
- The Architecture of the Park (1890)
