= Millhousebridge =

Coordinates: 55.156°N 3.406°W

Millhousebridge: Scottish Gaelic: Drochaid a' Mhuilinn
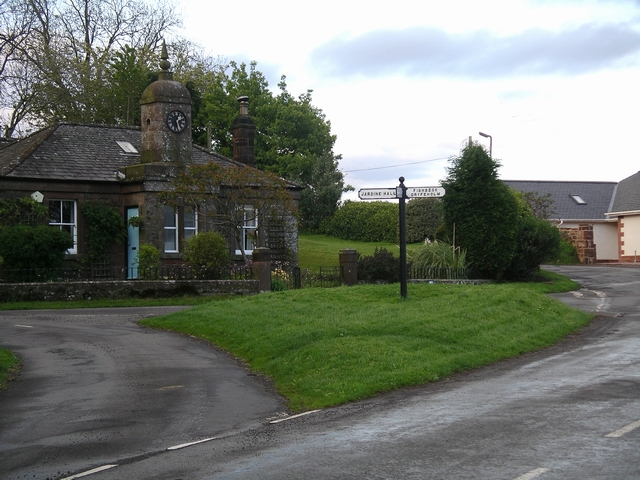
- A cottage with clock tower in Millhousebridge, perhaps the former school

- Location within Dumfries and Galloway
- OS grid reference: NY105855
- Council area: Dumfries and Galloway
- Lieutenancy area: Dumfries
- Country: Scotland
- Sovereign state: United Kingdom
- Post town: LOCKERBIE
- Postcode district: DG11
- Police: Scotland
- Fire: Scottish
- Ambulance: Scottish
- UK Parliament: Dumfriesshire, Clydesdale and Tweeddale
- Scottish Parliament: Dumfriesshire

Millhousebridge (Scottish Gaelic: Drochaid a' Mhuilinn) is a village in Dumfries and Galloway, Scotland. Millhousebridge is centrally located between Lochmaben and Lockerbie in Dumfries and Galloway. Generally, both towns are within a 3 to 5-mile radius of the hamlet, making it a short drive or cycle from either.
