= Auldgirth Bridge =

18th-century bridge in Dumfries and Galloway, Scotland

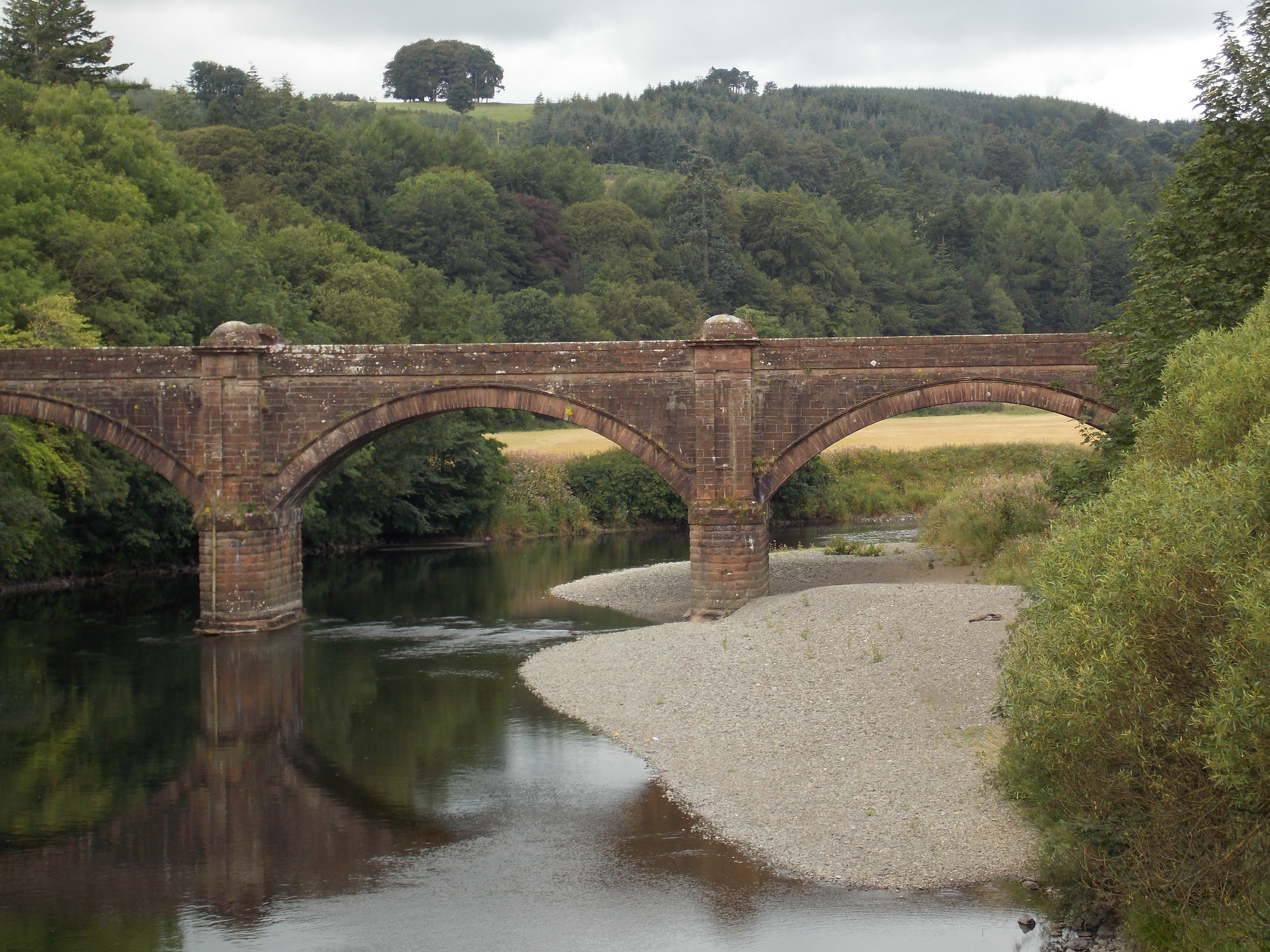
- The bridge, spanning the River Nith
- Coordinates: 55.15949°N 3.70974°W
- OS grid reference: NX 91165 86353
- Carries: Footpath (formerly A76 , bypassed in 1979)
- Crosses: River Nith
- Locale: Dumfries and Galloway
- Preceded by: Nith Bridge
- Followed by: Auldgirth New Bridge

Characteristics
- Design: Arch
- Material: Stone
- Total length: 200 feet (61 m)
- Width: 25.7 feet (7.8 m)
- No. of spans: 3

History
- Designer: David Henderson
- Construction end: 1782

Listed Building – Category A
- Official name: Auldgirth Bridge
- Designated: 2 August 1971
- Reference no.: LB3966

Location
- Interactive map of Auldgirth Bridge

Auldgirth Bridge is a bridge over the River Nith just outside Auldgirth in Dumfries and Galloway, Scotland. Designed by David Henderson of Edinburgh in 1781, it was built by William Stewart, and completed in 1782; Thomas Carlyle's father worked on its construction. The bridge is made of red sandstone ashlar, with three segmental arched spans, and carried road traffic and pedestrians; refuges are built into the parapets, supported by pilasters on the piers, allowing pedestrians using the bridge to move out of the path of heavier traffic. Its total length is 200 feet (61 m). Each of its three spans is 56 feet (17 m) wide, and its roadway, which is level, measures 25.7 feet (7.8 m) from one parapet to the other.

The bridge was built to carry the main road from Auldgirth (which became the A76) south over the river. It was designated a Category A listed building in 1971. In 1979, a new road bridge was completed a short distance away and the course of the road was altered, bypassing Auldgirth Bridge. It remains in use as a footbridge.

== See also ==
- List of bridges in Scotland
