= Brydekirk =

Brydekirk Eaglais Bhride Bridechapel, Brydekyrk
- Village and civil parish
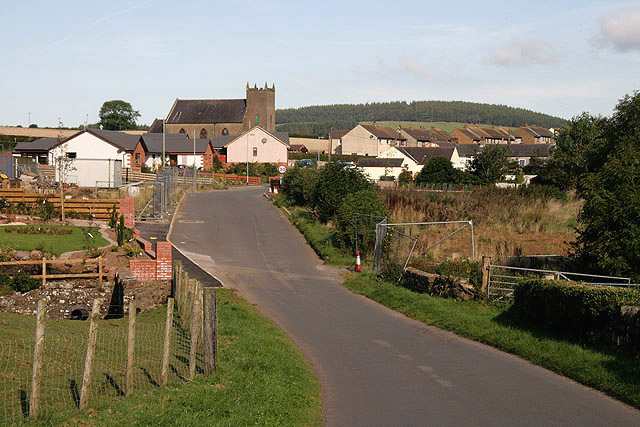
- Approaching Brydekirk from the southeast
- Nickname: The White Wash City
- Location within Scotland Location within the United Kingdom
- Coordinates: 55.022°N 3.277°W
- Sovereign state: United Kingdom
- Country: Scotland
- County: Dumfries and Galloway
- Shire: Dumfriesshire
- District: UK Parliament
- Constituency: Dumfriesshire, Clydesdale, and Tweeddale
- Scottish Parliament: Dumfriesshire
- Time zone: UTC±0 (Greenwich Mean Time)
  - Summer (DST): UTC+1 (British Summer Time)
- Postcode district: DG12
- Post town: Annan
- Dialling code: 01461
- Police Fire Ambulance: Scotland; Scottish; Scottish
- OS grid reference • London: NY184705; 440 km (270 mi) S
- Language: English

Brydekirk (Scottish Gaelic: Eaglais Bhride) is a village in Annandale in Dumfries and Galloway, Scotland located approximately 4 km north of Annan.

The village was a planned the concept dating to 1800 from the Paisley-Dirom family of Mount Annan, set around a bridge over the River Annan.

== History ==
The original village was called Bridechapel and was north west of what is now Mains Farm. The name has changed over time, from Bridechapel in 1507, Brydekyrk in 1517, and finally Brydekirk in 1660. It had its own water from St Brydes well, whose spring is still there.

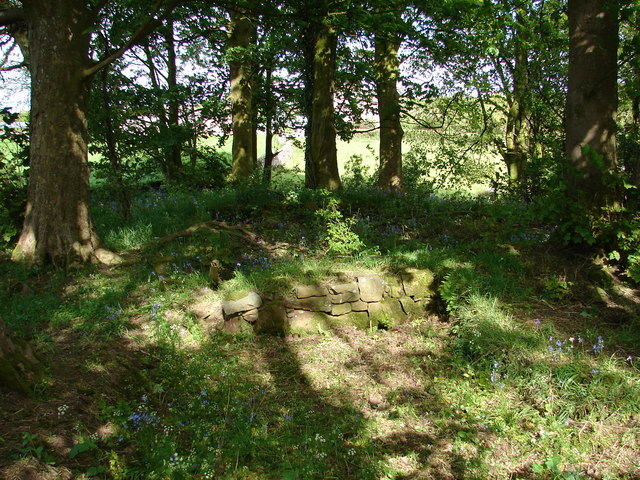
St Bryde's Kirk ruins.

The overgrown pond was the village pond at Brydekirk Mains Farm. You may see signs of the old village. The chapel had a rough stone wall surrounding it in 1100. Before Dirom's time, the village north west of Brydekirk called Brydechaple was built round a small chapel dedicated to Saint Bryde. In 1983, it was excavated by archaeologists who found coins dating back to 1496, now in the Dumfries Museum. (Note: Based on 'Our Village Brydekirk' by the children of Brydekirk School in 2014)

=== Mains Farm ===
The Bell family have lived at Mains Farm since at least the early 1800s. St Brides Tower is about 15 m high. The people lived above, and the animals lived underneath to help keep the people warm. The beams that held the floor are still visible to this day. A pond in front of the farm where water was dammed, so it could power the waterwheel. Brydekirk Mains Farm had their own corn mill, which the Bell family has worked in since at least the 1940s. The quarry, where the boys from school probably went to work, is nearly all filled in. It is about a field away from the school park. That field is known locally as "The American" because of its size.

=== Lieutenant General Alexander Dirom ===
A landowner, Lieutenant General Alexander Dirom, wanted to build an industrial village by the River Annan to increase the value of his land. Dirom made many plans for Brydekirk.

Born in 1757 at Banff, Aberdeenshire, Dirom came to Annan when he married Magdalene Paisley, the heiress of the Mount Annan estate. They lived at Mount Annan for many years with seven sons and five daughters.

To begin the industrialisation, Dirom had roads and a bridge constructed between 1799 and 1800. A stone bridge with three arches went over the river Annan. Dirom also built a mile long road from Mount Annan to Brydekirk, with a gate and a porters' lodge at each end. Dirom used the river to power Brydekirk's industries, including a corn mill, woollen mill, and a bleach field to bleach the cloth by the sun. Dirom was also interested in quarrying his land's fine sandstone from Corsehill and a lime from a quarry at Brownmoor. In 1791, he unsuccessfully tried to bore for coal. The houses were to be built by the people themselves, and then a set rent was paid to Dirom. He wanted hard-working people to live in the village. The first six houses were built by Dirom. The houses were all built to his plan, each with a slated roof and built with limestone from quarries at Brownmoor. Each house was to be white washed in the spring of every year, the cottages were said to glisten in the sun and Brydekirk was nicknamed "The White Wash City". The village was thriving, but Dirom never completed his elaborate plan. Dirom died at Mount Annan in October 1830, aged 74. He and his family were buried in the churchyard at Annan old parish church.

=== 1835 to present day ===
In 1835, Brydekirk Parish Church was constructed and the interior was recast in 1900.

In 1837, the list of people in the village were:

- 1 clergy
- 2 Clogmakers
- 1 cooper
- 3 grocers and spirit dealer
- 4 mason builders
- 1 miller
- 1 tailor
- 1 vintner
- 1 flax dresser
- 2 blacksmiths.

== Community facilities ==
There is a community village hall in Brydekirk.
