= Corsewall Point =

Headland in Dumfries and Galloway, Scotland

- Headland
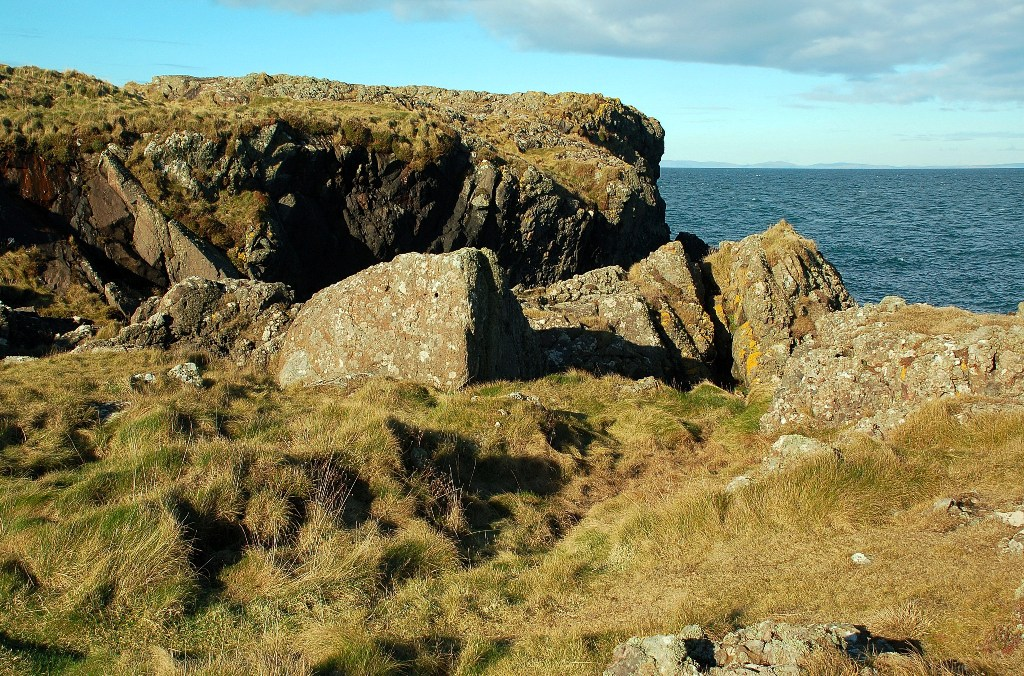
- Ancient Fort at Corsewall Point

- Coordinates: 55°00′31″N 05°09′26″W
- Grid position: NW 98211 72799
- Location: Rhins of Galloway, Dumfries and Galloway

Corsewall Point, or Corsill Point, is the headland at the northwestern end of the Rhins of Galloway, in Dumfries and Galloway, west of Scotland.

Corsewall Point is the southeasterly boundary point between the Firth of Clyde and the North Channel, with the southerly tip of the Kintyre Peninsula the northwest point. The North Channel is customarily considered as part of the Irish Sea.

== Lighthouse ==
A lighthouse, Corsewall Lighthouse, was built on the headland in 1816, to assist vessels passing the headland in the area of the Firth of Clyde and North Channel boundary.

== Sources ==
- William Smith, a 19th-century British Classicist identifies the point with the Novantarum Promontorium (Ancient Greek: Νοουαντῶν ἄκρον) mentioned by Ptolemy in his Geography as the most northerly point of the peninsula of the Novantae in Britannia Barbara.
