= Dalton, Dumfries and Galloway =

Coordinates: 55°03′11″N 3°23′16″W

Dalton
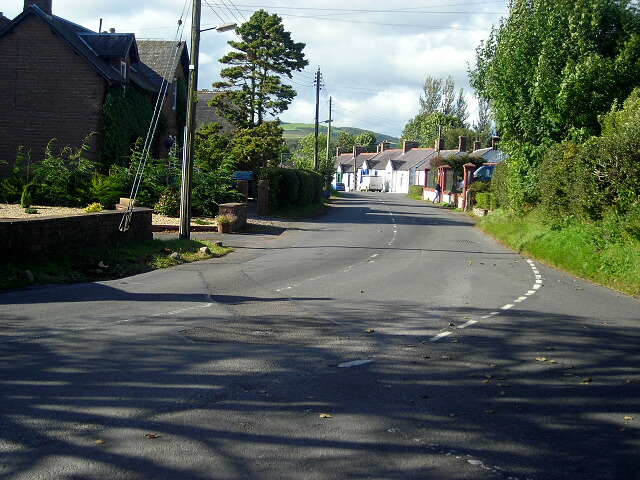
- Dalton Village

- Location within Dumfries and Galloway
- OS grid reference: NY114739
- Council area: Dumfries and Galloway
- Lieutenancy area: Dumfriesshire
- Country: Scotland
- Sovereign state: United Kingdom
- Post town: LOCKERBIE
- Postcode district: DG11
- Police: Scotland
- Fire: Scottish
- Ambulance: Scottish
- UK Parliament: Dumfriesshire, Clydesdale and Tweeddale
- Scottish Parliament: Dumfriesshire

The village of Dalton is a small settlement about 10 miles (16 km) southeast of Dumfries and 4 miles (6.4 km) south of Lockerbie, in Dumfries and Galloway, Scotland.

The village has an 18th-century church, one of its past ministers being The Rev. John W. Morris MA, who is buried near the southern boundary of the church. Several families have lived here for more than 150 years, including the: Byers, Bells (Almagill), Shuttleworths (Almagill), Carruthers (Dormont), Murrays (Murraythwaite), and Steels (Kirkwood). Dalton has a Thai restaurant and pub, and a well used village hall.

About 1 mile (1.6 km) west of Dalton on the Carrutherstown road is Dalton Pottery. On the farms around Dalton, there are several self-catering, stone-built, holiday cottages at Kirkwood - offering tourist accommodation and walking, as well as fishing on the River Annan.
