= Crossmichael =

Coordinates: 54°58′47″N 3°59′03″W

Crossmichael: Scottish Gaelic: Crois Mhìcheil
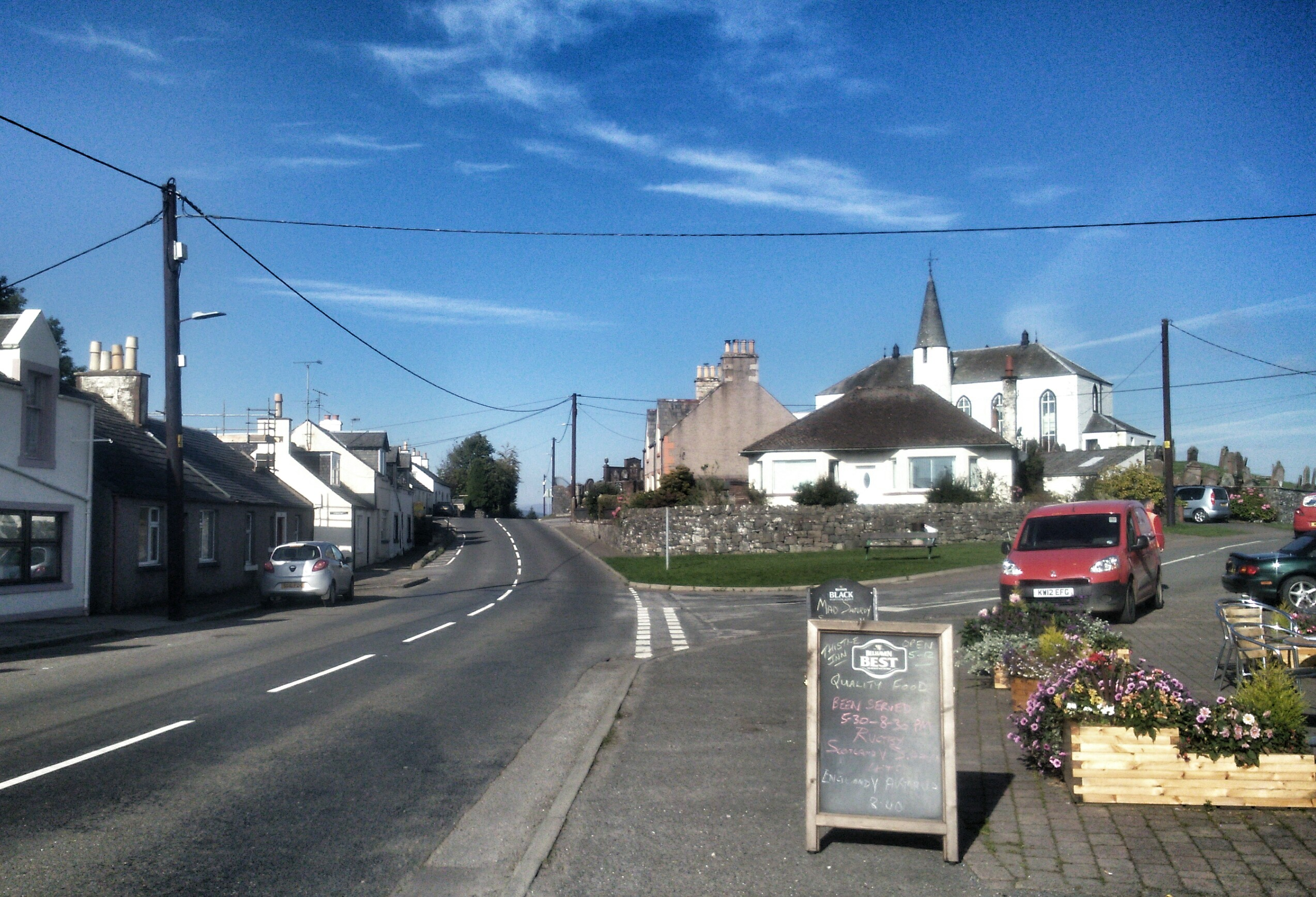
- Crossmichael

- Location within Dumfries and Galloway
- OS grid reference: NX730670
- Council area: Dumfries and Galloway
- Lieutenancy area: Kirkcudbrightshire
- Country: Scotland
- Sovereign state: United Kingdom
- Post town: CASTLE DOUGLAS
- Postcode district: DG7
- Police: Scotland
- Fire: Scottish
- Ambulance: Scottish
- UK Parliament: Dumfries and Galloway
- Scottish Parliament: Galloway and West Dumfries

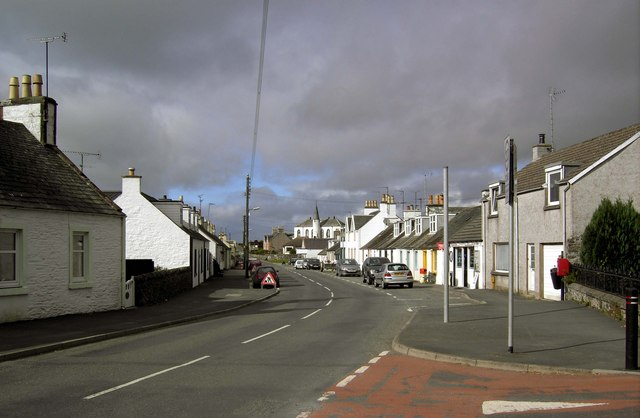
Crossmichael Main Street.

Crossmichael (Scottish Gaelic: Crois Mhìcheil) is a small village in Scotland. It is located on the east side of Loch Ken in the historical county of Kirkcudbrightshire, about 4 miles (6.4 km) north of Castle Douglas.

Crossmichael is also the name of the civil parish in Kirkcudbrightshire, in the district council region of Dumfries and Galloway.

== History ==
Crossmichael was first recorded in 1164 when Galloway was an independent land.

Townhead of Greenlaw is 1 mile (1.6 km) to its south. The site of Greenlaw, Crossmichael, National Grid Reference (NGR): NX 74800 64500, is said to be a Roman burial ground, and occupies rising ground.

A Roman fort once existed to the south near Glenlochar barrage at Abbey Yard.

Sixteen other forts, mottes, stone circles and cairns all lie within 3 miles (5 km) of Crossmichael.

== Facilities ==
Crossmichael has a pub, shop, a marina, and a church with a distinctive steeple.

== Transport ==
The A713 road runs through Crossmichael. It is on the 520 bus route.

== The Church ==
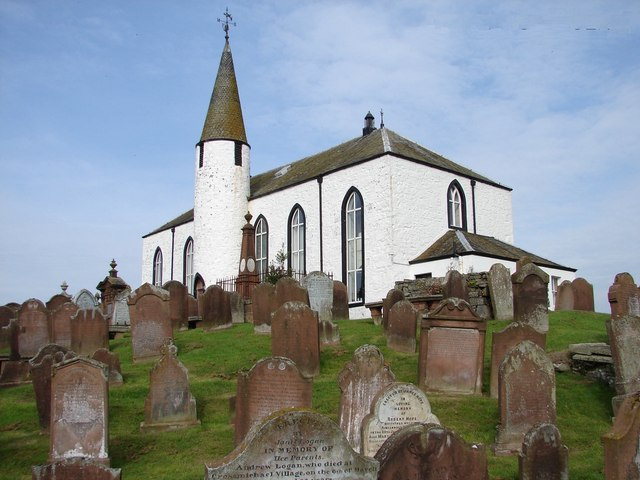
Crossmichael Church and graveyard

The village name comes from the Cross of St. Michael patron saint of the original church.

The Parish of Crossmichael is recorded as far back as the 12th century. A building was believed to be present prior to AD1547 as the earliest tombstone in the churchyard bears that date. The present church building dates from 1751, but includes the distinctive round tower of earlier date. Some evidence suggests that the round tower was built around 1611 by Sir Robert Gordon of Greenlaw, Crossmichael Parish. The date on the bell (1611) in the round tower tends to confirm this. The main block of the present building was built in 1749–1751, and additions and alterations were made several times in the nineteenth century, including work in 1880–1881 by the architect John Starforth. The church interior contains the Lairds' Lofts of the local families from Danevale Park, Culgruff and Mollance House.

The Churchyard has Covenanters graves dating from the ‘ Killing Times ‘ of the 1680, a fine enriched Gordon monument (1757), a table stone with an acrostic epitaph to Rev Andrew Dick, and three war graves.

== Estates ==
- Culgruff House, Baronial style mansion of 1889, designed by architect Charles William Stephens, later the architect of Harrods Department Store in London, built in red sandstone, 2 storeys with attics and tall square tower. Above entrance door the inscription "God's Providence is Mine Inheritance" and date of 1889. Built by Robert Stewart of Southwick who married Georgina Eleanor Maxwell daughter of Sir William Maxwell 3rd baronet of Cardoness. From 1947 to 2015 in use as an hotel. Is listed as Category B.
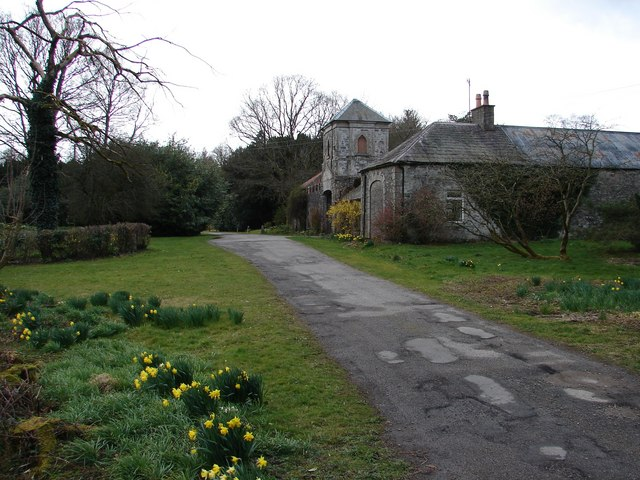
  Danevale Park, the Stables
- Danevale Park Estate. Was a late Georgian country house of 1795, altered in 1883 by architect David Robertson. Demolished 1950s with new house on site.
- Mollance House, mid to late 19th century large country house probably incorporating an earlier house of 1736. Destroyed by fire c.1928, parts of shell remain.
- Greenlaw House, dating from 1740. Built by the Gordons of Kenmure Castle. Destroyed by fire in the 80s and rebuilt in the 2000s.
- Hillowton, a small 19th-century country house.
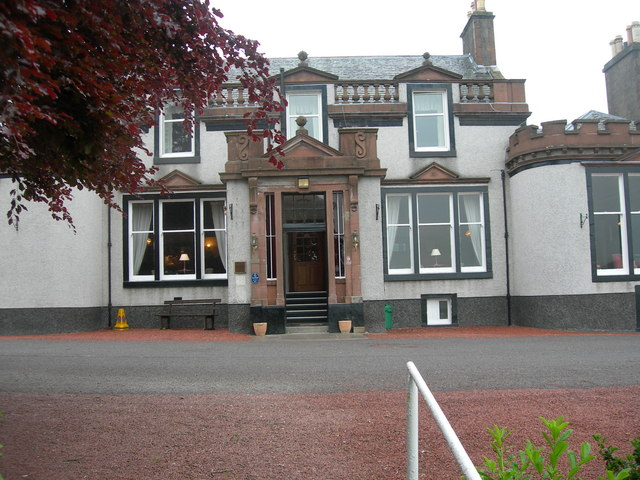
  Ernespie House
- Ernespie House, mid c18 with c19 additions, on site of an earlier house. Long in use as a hotel.

== Notable people ==
- Robert Gordon of Lochinvar (c.1565 – 1628). On 12 July 1626 he was appointed a member of the Council of war for Scotland and a Commissioner for the Middle Shires, residing at Greenlaw, Crossmichael Parish, Kirkcudbrightshire (near Culvennan. He donated the bell that is in the Crossmichael Church Tower. Sir Robert Gordon was one of the first to embark in the scheme for the establishment of colonies in North America, having on 8 November 1621 obtained a charter of what was called the barony of Galloway in Nova Scotia, and in 1625 he published a tract on the subject. "Encouragements for such as shall have intention to bee Vndertakers in the new plantation...By mee Lochinvar...Edinburgh, 1625" His 2nd son, Robert Gordon of Gelston joined with his father in (The Plantation of America) in the grant of the barony of Galloway in Nova Scotia in 1621. On 1 July 1629, 70 Scots under the leadership of James Stewart, 4th Lord Ochiltree of Killeith, landed at Baleine, Cape Breton Island, probably encouraged by Sir Robert Gordon of Lochinvar (who resided at Greenlaw, Crossmichael Parish).
- William Neill, (1922–2010) poet in both Gaelic and English. In 1969 he won the bardic crown at the National Mod at Aviemore.
- Jim Greenwood, (1928–2010) was a Scottish rugby union player and coach. He won twenty caps for Scotland and four for the British Lions as a number eight and flanker. He published three books – Improve Your Rugby (1967), Total Rugby (1978) and Think Rugby (1986). Total Rugby and Think Rugby are considered seminal books on rugby coaching, and have been updated and reprinted numerous times due to demand, as recently as 2015.

== See also ==
- List of listed buildings in Crossmichael, Dumfries and Galloway
