= Tinwald, Dumfries and Galloway =

Village in Dumfries and Galloway, Scotland

Coordinates: 55°07′06″N 3°33′47″W

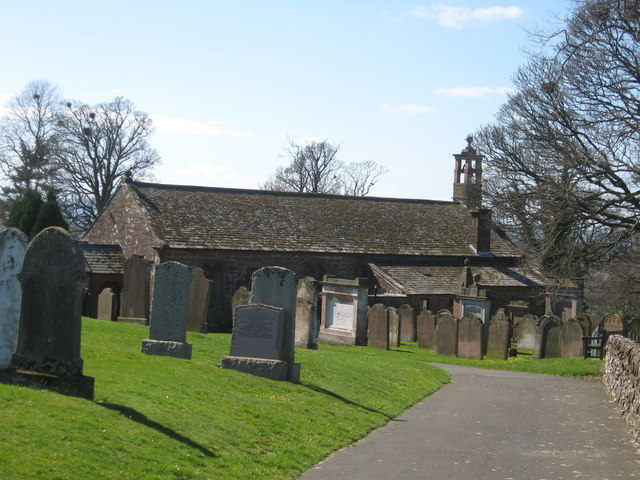
Tinwald Church, built on the site of an earlier church standing opposite a motte

Tinwald is a village in Dumfries and Galloway, south-west Scotland, lying a little north of Locharbriggs outside Dumfries. Tinwald is also the name of a civil parish in the county of Dumfriesshire. The village is near the former RAF Tinwald Downs which is now the Dumfries Aviation Museum.

== Tinwald Church ==
The church, built in 1769 on the foundations of an earlier church, is on the side of Tinwald Hill and visible from the A701 road. The barony and rectory of Tinwald, before and after the Reformation, belonged to the Maxwell family, who appointed the vicars and later the ministers. In 1504 Willelmus Blak was vicar of Tynwald. On 13 July 1619 Robert Maxwell was served heir to his father, John Maxwell of "terris de Tynwald" in "baroniam de Tynwald".

== Tinwald Mote ==
In the 15th century the Tinwald Mote was still the caput or "legal head of the barony, where sasine [possession] of the lands was given by the ceremony of handing to the grantee, before witnesses, a handful of earth and stone from the 'head messuage called the Mote near the church of Tynwald'".

== Notable people ==
- William Paterson (1658–1719), banker, born at Tinwald
- John Charteris (1877–1946), British Army brigadier-general, buried in Tinwald Church churchyard
