= John R. Hume =

Architectural historian

Professor John R. Hume OBE is an architectural and business historian, author and photographer. He spent 20 years at the University of Strathclyde, researching and lecturing on Economic and Industrial History, before being employed as the principal inspector of ancient monuments, and then of historic buildings, for Historic Scotland. He was chief inspector of historic buildings until retirement in 1999; whereupon he became chairman of the Royal Commission on the Ancient and Historical Monuments of Scotland to 2015. Today it is known as Historic Environment Scotland.

He holds honorary professorships at both the University of Glasgow and the University of St Andrews, and he continues to serve as a patron of the Glasgow City Heritage Trust, and as a member of the panel of judges for the Scottish Engineering Hall of Fame.

The book Visions of Scotland's past: Looking to the future. Essays in honour of John R. Hume was published in 2000, to mark his retirement.

Hume donated to RCAHMS over 40,000 photographs of a wide range of industrial, business and transport subjects taken by him over decades, and are accessible through Canmore. His photographic record of the decline of Scotland's industrial landscapes in the twentieth century is the subject of a book by Daniel Gray, published in August 2021.

== Publications ==
- Industrial Archaeology of Glasgow (1971), ISBN 978-0216898332
- Steam Entertainment (1974), ISBN 978-0715366455
- The Industrial Archaeology of Scotland 1: The Lowlands and Borders (1977), ISBN 9780713432343
- The Industrial Archaeology of Scotland 2: The Highlands and Islands (1977), ISBN 9780713408096
- Beardmore: History of a Scottish Industrial Giant (1979) - with Michael S. Moss.
- Shipbuilders to the World: 125 Years of Harland & Wolff, Belfast, 1861-1986 (1986) - with Michael S. Moss.
- Scotland's Industrial Past: An Introduction to Scotland's Industrial History with a Catalogue of Preserved Material (1990), ISBN 978-0948636226
- Industry and Transport in Scottish Museums (1997), ISBN 978-0114952563
- Dumfries and Galloway: An Illustrated Architectural Guide (2000), ISBN 1-873-190-344
- The Making of Scotch Whisky: A History Of The Scottish Whisky Distilling Industry (2000), ISBN 978-1841950105 - with Michael S. Moss.
- Vernacular Building in Ayrshire (2004), ISBN 978-0954225322
- Scotland's Best Churches (2005), ISBN 978-0748621798
- Wigtownshire Vernacular Buildings (2009), ISBN 978-1-906737-01-6
- Church Buildings in Wigtownshire (2016), ISBN 978-1-906737-11-5
- 1000 years of Scottish Churches. Late nineteenth century and early twentieth century churches, 1878 to the First World War (2018), ISBN 9781840338157
- Colouring Glasgow (2017)
