= George Washington =

Founding Father, U.S. president from 1789 to 1797

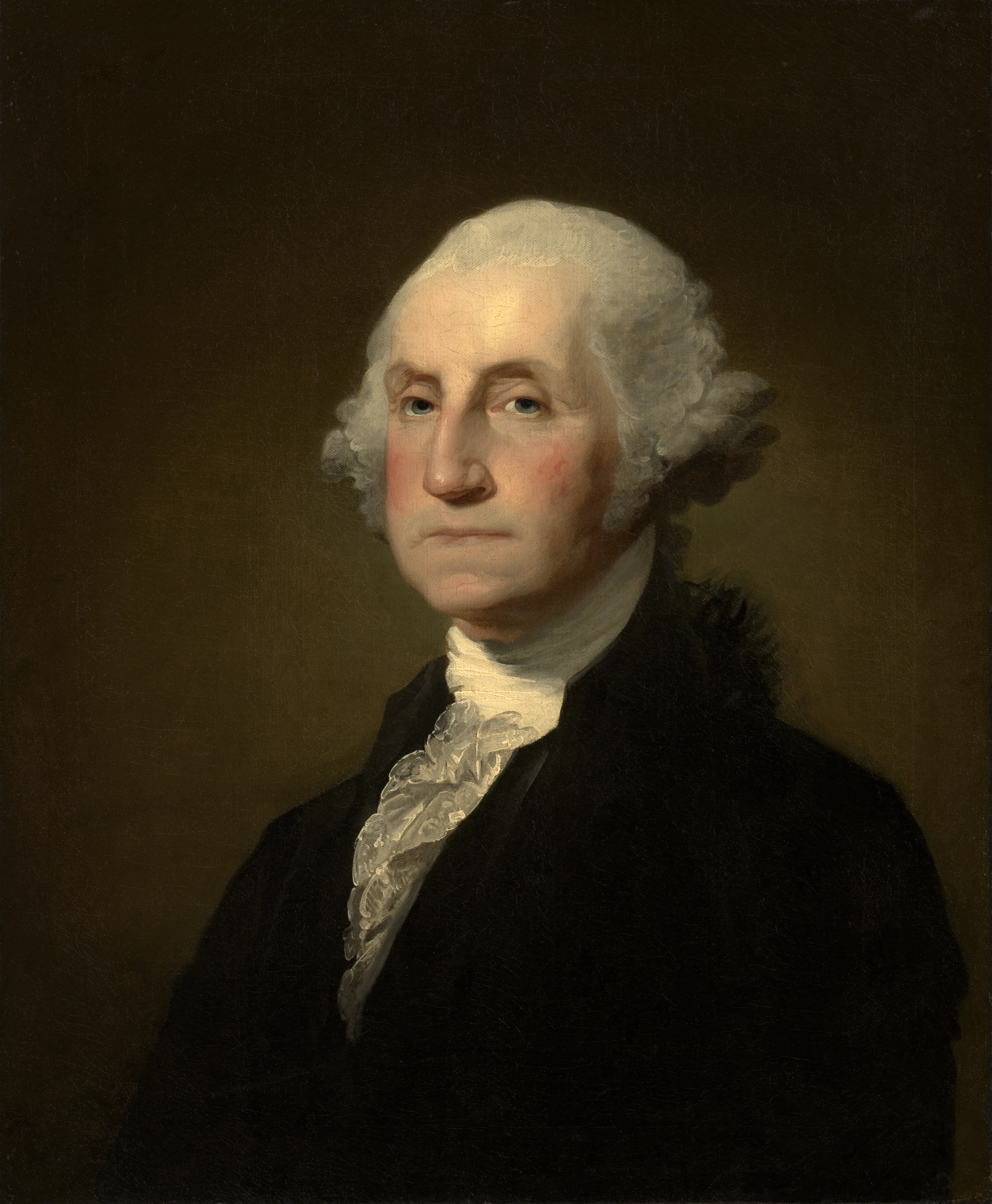
- Portrait, c. 1803

1st President of the United States
- In office April 30, 1789 – March 4, 1797
- Vice President: John Adams
- Preceded by: Office established
- Succeeded by: John Adams

Commander-in-Chief of the Continental Army
- In office June 19, 1775 – December 23, 1783
- Appointed by: Continental Congress
- Preceded by: Office established
- Succeeded by: Henry Knox (as Senior Officer)
Other positions
Delegate from Virginia to the Continental Congress
In office September 5, 1774 – June 16, 1775
| Preceded by | Office established |
| Succeeded by | Thomas Jefferson |
Member of the Virginia House of Burgesses
In office July 24, 1758 – June 24, 1775
| Preceded by | Hugh West |
| Succeeded by | Office abolished |
| Constituency | Frederick County (1758–1765); Fairfax County (1765–1775) |
14th Chancellor of the College of William & Mary
In office April 30, 1788 – December 14, 1799
| Preceded by | Richard Terrick |
| Succeeded by | John Tyler |

Personal details
- Born: February 22, 1732 (Note: Contemporaneous records used the Old Style Julian calendar and the Annunciation Style of enumerating years, recording his birth as February 11, 1731. The British Calendar (New Style) Act 1750 implemented in 1752 altered the official British dating method to the Gregorian calendar with the start of the year on January 1 (it had been March 25). These changes resulted in dates being moved forward 11 days and an advance of one year for those between January 1 and March 25. For a further explanation, see Old Style and New Style dates.) Popes Creek, Virginia, British America
- Died: December 14, 1799 (aged 67) Mount Vernon, Virginia, U.S.
- Resting place: Mount Vernon
- Party: Independent
- Spouse: Martha Dandridge (m. 1759)
- Relatives: Washington family
- Occupation: Military officer; politician; surveyor; planter
- Awards: Congressional Gold Medal; Thanks of Congress

Military service
- Branch/service: Virginia Militia; Continental Army; United States Army
- Years of service: 1752–1758 (Virginia Militia); 1775–1783 (Continental Army); 1798–1799 (U.S. Army)
- Rank: Colonel (1st Virginia Regiment); Colonel (Virginia Militia); General and Commander-in-chief (Continental Army); Lieutenant General (U.S. Army); General of the Armies (appointed posthumously)
- Commands: Virginia Regiment; Continental Army; United States Army
- Battles/wars: See list: French and Indian War; Battle of Jumonville Glen; Battle of Fort Necessity; Braddock Expedition; Battle of the Monongahela; Forbes Expedition; American Revolutionary War; Boston campaign; New York and New Jersey campaign; Philadelphia campaign; Yorktown campaign; American Indian Wars; Northwest Indian War; Whiskey Rebellion

George Washington (February 22, 1732 [O.S. February 11, 1731] – December 14, 1799) was a Founding Father and the first president of the United States, serving from 1789 to 1797. As commander of the Continental Army, Washington led Patriot forces to victory in the American Revolutionary War against the British Empire. He is commonly known as the Father of His Country for his role in bringing about American independence.

Born in the Colony of Virginia, Washington became the commander of the Virginia Regiment during the French and Indian War from 1754 to 1763. He was later elected to the Virginia House of Burgesses, and opposed the oppression of the American colonists by the British Crown. When the American Revolutionary War against the British began in 1775, Washington was appointed commander-in-chief of the Continental Army. He directed a poorly organized and equipped force against disciplined British troops.

Washington and his army achieved an early victory at the siege of Boston in March 1776 but were forced to retreat from New York City in November. Washington crossed the Delaware River and won the battles of Trenton in late 1776 and of Princeton in early 1777, then lost the battles of Brandywine and Germantown later that year. He faced criticism of his command, low troop morale, and a lack of provisions for his forces as the war continued. Ultimately Washington led a combined French and American force to a decisive victory over the British at Yorktown in 1781. In the resulting Treaty of Paris in 1783, the British acknowledged the sovereign independence of the United States. Washington then served as president of the Constitutional Convention in 1787, which drafted the current Constitution of the United States.

Washington was unanimously elected the first U.S. president by the Electoral College in 1789 and 1792. He established a strong, well-financed national government while remaining impartial in the fierce rivalry that emerged within his cabinet between Thomas Jefferson and Alexander Hamilton. During the French Revolution, he adopted a policy of neutrality while supporting the Jay Treaty with Britain. Washington set enduring precedents for the office of president, including republicanism, a peaceful transfer of power, the use of the title "Mr. President", and the two-term tradition. His 1796 farewell address became a preeminent statement on republicanism: Washington wrote about the importance of national unity and the dangers that regionalism, partisanship, and foreign influence pose to it. As a planter of tobacco and wheat at Mount Vernon, Washington owned many slaves. He began opposing slavery near the end of his life, and provided in his will for the eventual manumission of his slaves.

Washington's image is an icon of American culture and he has been extensively memorialized. His namesakes include the national capital and the State of Washington. In both popular and scholarly polls, he is consistently considered one of the greatest presidents in American history.

== Early life (1732–1752) ==
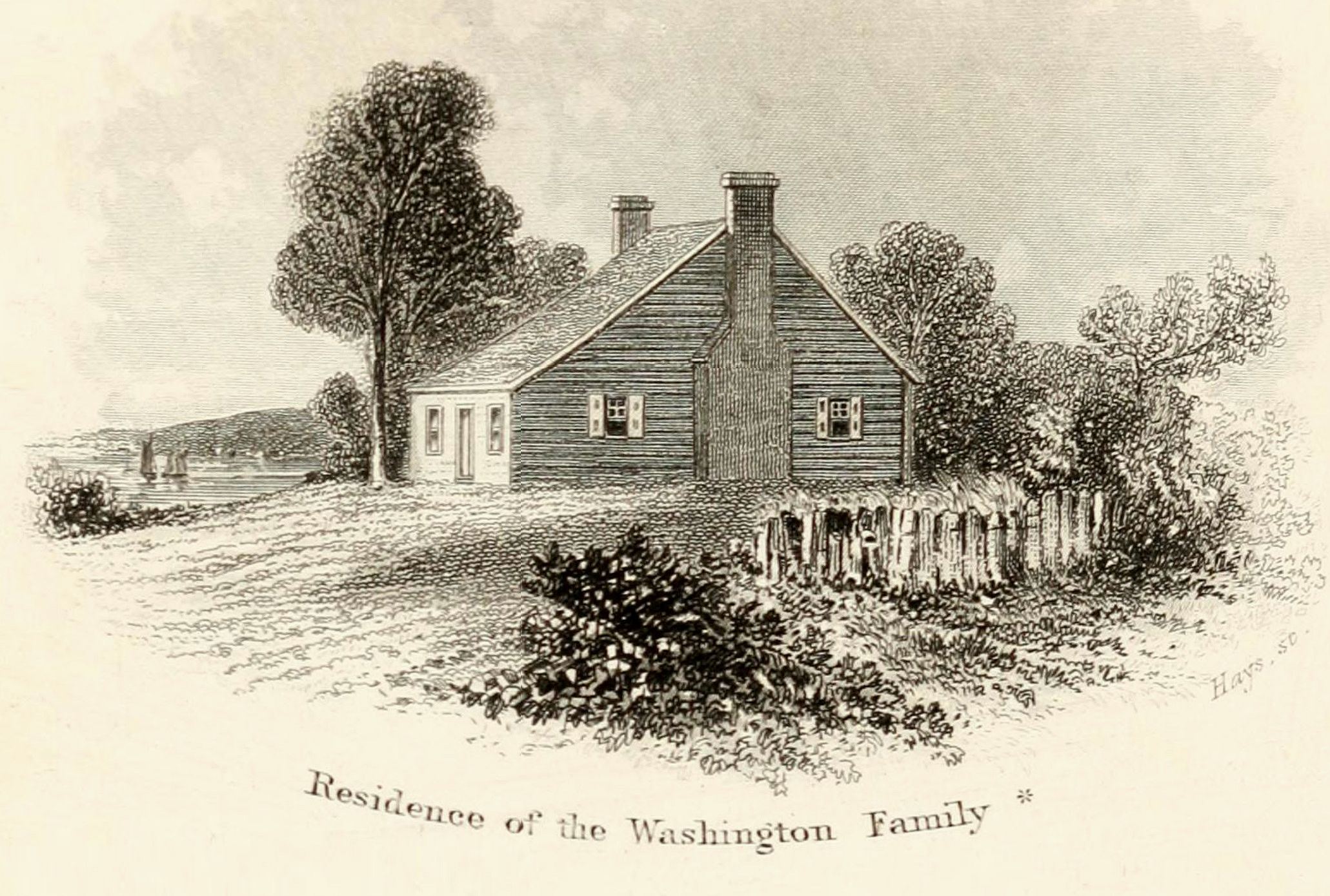
Ferry Farm, the Washington family residence on the Rappahannock River in Stafford County, Virginia, where Washington spent much of his youth

George Washington was born on February 22, 1732, at Popes Creek in Westmoreland County, Virginia. He was the first of six children of Augustine and Mary Ball Washington. His father was a justice of the peace and a prominent public figure who had four additional children from his first marriage to Jane Butler. Washington was not close to his father and rarely mentioned him in later years; he had a fractious relationship with his mother. Among his siblings, he was particularly close to his older half-brother Lawrence.

The family moved to a plantation on Little Hunting Creek in 1735 before settling at Ferry Farm near Fredericksburg, Virginia, in 1738. When Augustine died in 1743, Washington inherited Ferry Farm and ten slaves; Lawrence inherited Little Hunting Creek and renamed it Mount Vernon. Because of his father's death, Washington did not have the formal education his elder half-brothers had received at Appleby Grammar School in England; he instead attended the Lower Church School in Hartfield. He learned mathematics and land surveying, and became a talented draftsman and mapmaker. By early adulthood, he was writing with what his biographer Ron Chernow described as "considerable force" and "precision". As a teenager, Washington compiled over a hundred rules for social interaction styled The Rules of Civility, copied from an English translation of a French guidebook.

Washington often visited Belvoir, the plantation of William Fairfax, Lawrence's father-in-law, and Mount Vernon. Fairfax became Washington's patron and surrogate father. In 1748, Washington spent a month with a team surveying Fairfax's Shenandoah Valley property. The following year, he received a surveyor's license from the College of William & Mary. (Note: The charter of the College of William & Mary gave it the authority to appoint Virginia county surveyors. There is no evidence that Washington actually attended classes there.) Even though Washington had not served the customary apprenticeship, Thomas Fairfax (William's cousin) appointed him surveyor of Culpeper County, Virginia. Washington took his oath of office on July 20, 1749, and resigned in 1750. By 1752, he had bought almost 1,500 acres (600 ha) in the Shenandoah Valley and owned 2,315 acres (937 ha).

In 1751, Washington left mainland North America for the first and only time, when he accompanied Lawrence to Barbados, hoping the climate would cure his brother's tuberculosis. Washington contracted smallpox during the trip, which left his face slightly scarred and provided immunity against future infection. Lawrence died in 1752, and Washington leased Mount Vernon from his widow, Ann; he inherited it outright after her death in 1761. The Barbados journey exposed Washington to the wider British Atlantic world and to aspects of plantation society and imperial administration beyond Virginia.

== Colonial military career (1752–1758) ==
Lawrence Washington's service as adjutant general of the Virginia militia inspired George to seek a militia commission. Virginia's lieutenant governor, Robert Dinwiddie, appointed Washington as a major and commander of one of the four militia districts. The British and French were competing for control of the Ohio River Valley: the British were constructing forts along the river, and the French between the river and Lake Erie.

In October 1753, Dinwiddie appointed Washington as a special envoy to demand the French forces vacate land that was claimed by the British. Washington was also directed to make peace with the Haudenosaunee (Iroquois) Confederacy and to gather intelligence about the French forces. Washington met with Haudenosaunee leader Tanacharison at Logstown. Washington said that at this meeting Tanacharison named him Conotocaurius. This name, meaning "devourer of villages", had previously been given to his great-grandfather John Washington in the late 17th century by the Susquehannock.

Washington's party reached the Ohio River in November 1753 and was intercepted by a French patrol. The party was escorted to Fort Le Boeuf, where Washington was received in a friendly manner. He delivered the British demand to vacate to the French commander Jacques Legardeur de Saint-Pierre, but the French refused to leave. Saint-Pierre gave Washington his official answer after a few days' delay, as well as food and winter clothing for his party's journey back to Virginia. Washington completed the precarious mission in difficult winter conditions, achieving a measure of distinction when his report was published in Virginia and London.

=== French and Indian War ===
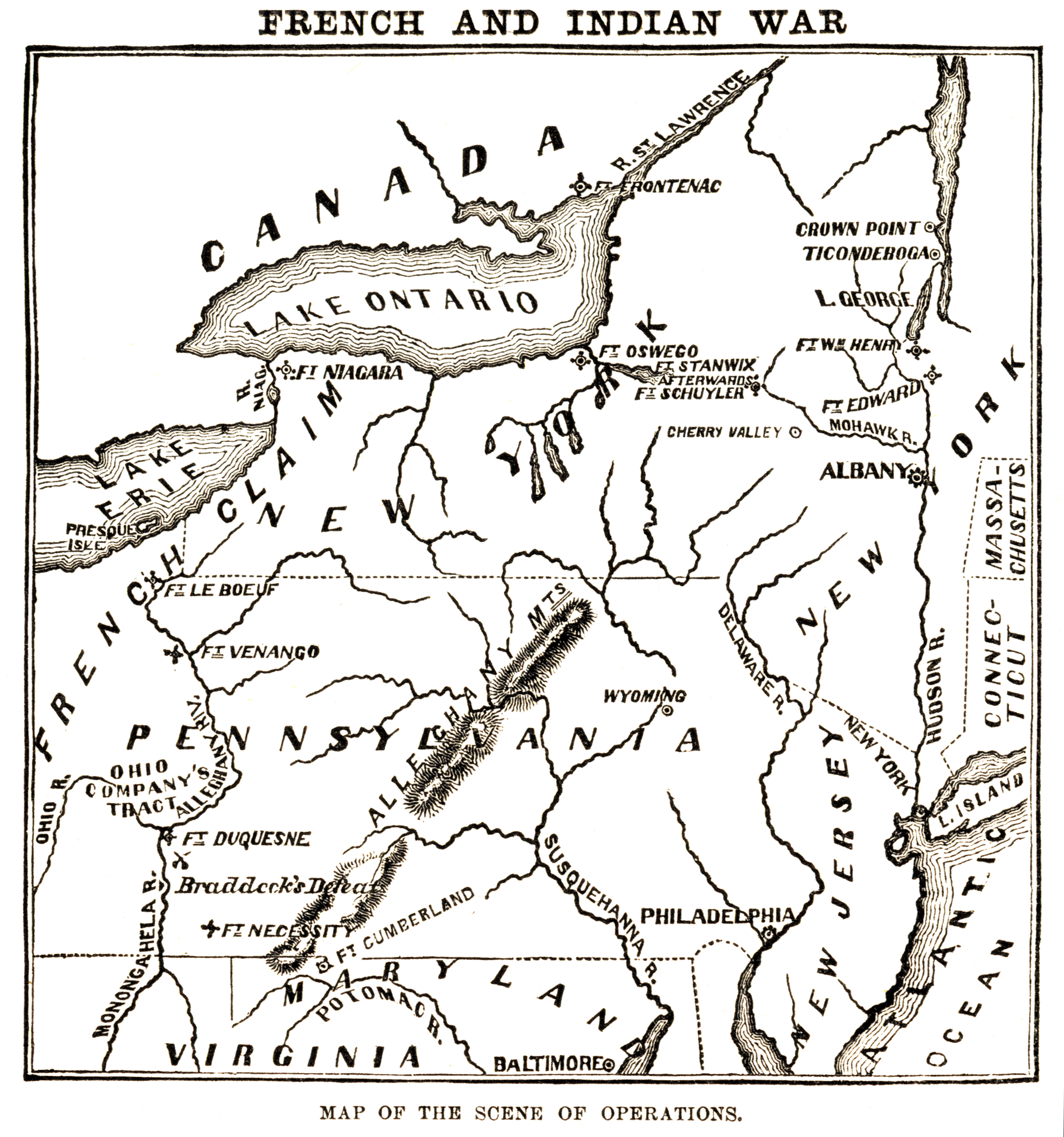
Map showing key locations in the French and Indian War

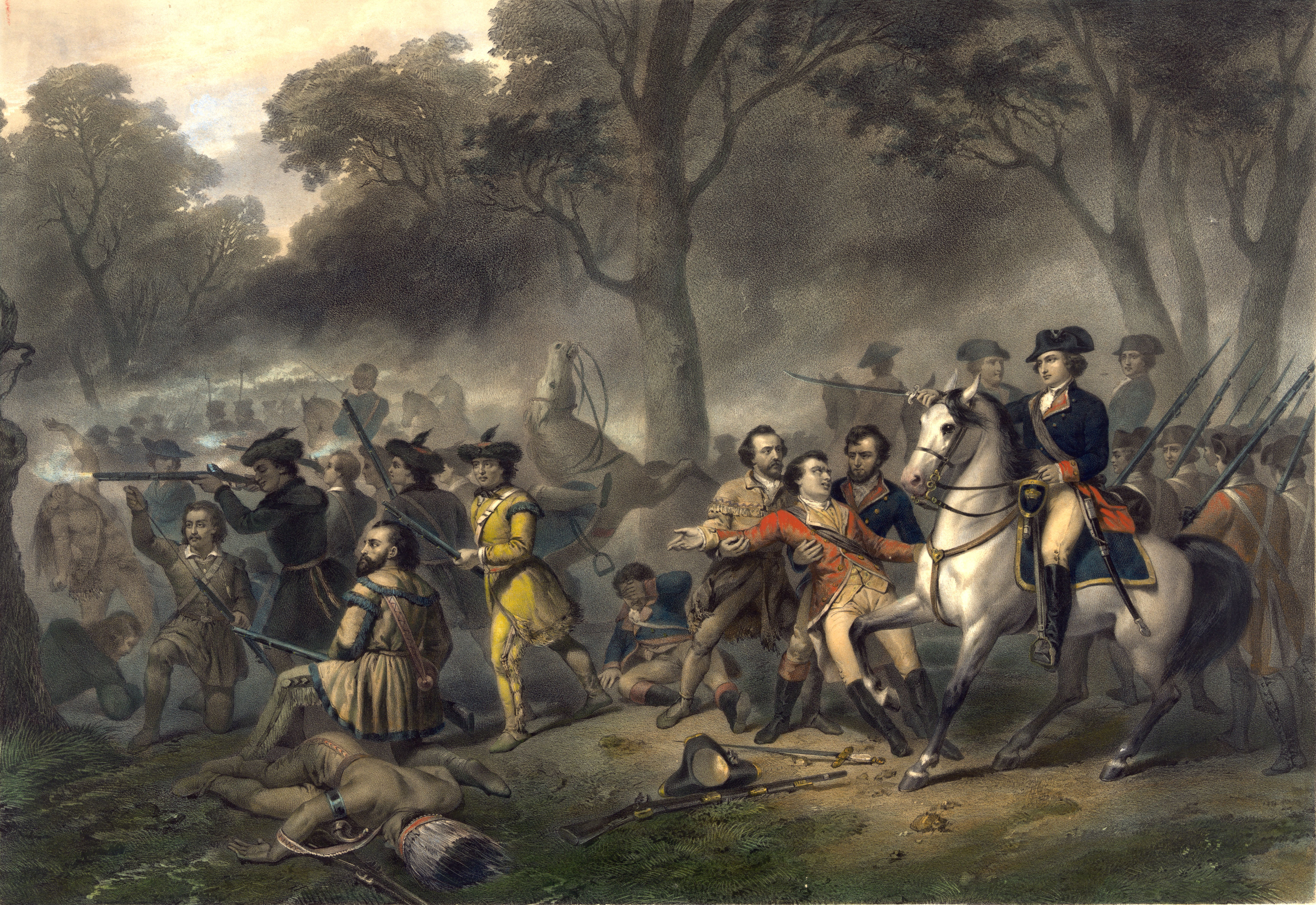
Washington the Soldier, an 1834 portrait of Washington on horseback during the Battle of the Monongahela

In February 1754, Dinwiddie promoted Washington to lieutenant colonel and second-in-command of the 300-strong Virginia Regiment, with orders to confront the French at the Forks of the Ohio. Washington set out with half the regiment in April and was soon aware that a French force of 1,000 had begun construction of Fort Duquesne there. In May, having established a defensive position at Great Meadows, Washington learned that the French had made camp seven miles (11 km) away; he decided to take the offensive. The French detachment proved to be only about 50 men, so on May 28 Washington commanded an ambush. His small force of Virginians and Indian allies (Note: The word "Indian" was used at the time to describe the Indigenous peoples of the Americas.) killed the French, including their commander Joseph Coulon de Jumonville, who had been carrying a diplomatic message for the British. The French later found their countrymen dead and scalped, blaming Washington, who had retreated to Fort Necessity.

The rest of the Virginia Regiment joined Washington the following month with news that he had been promoted to the rank of colonel and given command of the full regiment. They were reinforced by an independent company of a hundred South Carolinians led by Captain James Mackay; his royal commission outranked Washington's and a conflict of command ensued. On July 3, 900 French soldiers attacked Fort Necessity, and the ensuing battle ended in Washington's surrender. Washington did not speak French, but signed a surrender document in which he unwittingly took responsibility for "assassinating" Jumonville, later blaming the translator for not properly translating it. The Virginia Regiment was divided and Washington was offered a captaincy in one of the newly formed regiments. He refused, as it would have been a demotion—the British had ordered that "colonials" could not be ranked any higher than captain—and instead resigned his commission. The Jumonville affair became the incident which ignited the French and Indian War.

In 1755, Washington volunteered as an aide to General Edward Braddock, who led a British expedition to expel the French from Fort Duquesne and the Ohio Country. On Washington's recommendation, Braddock split the army into one main column and a smaller "flying column". Washington was suffering from severe dysentery so did not initially travel with the expedition forces. When he rejoined Braddock at Monongahela, still very ill, the French and their Indian allies ambushed the divided army. Two-thirds of the British force became casualties in the ensuing Battle of the Monongahela, and Braddock was killed. Under the command of Lieutenant Colonel Thomas Gage, Washington rallied the survivors and formed a rear guard, allowing the remnants of the force to retreat. During the engagement, Washington had two horses shot out from under him, and his hat and coat were pierced by bullets. His conduct redeemed his reputation among critics of his command in the Battle of Fort Necessity, but he was not included by the succeeding commander (Colonel Thomas Dunbar) in planning subsequent operations.

The Virginia Regiment was reconstituted in August 1755, and Dinwiddie appointed Washington its commander, again with the rank of colonel. Washington clashed over seniority almost immediately, this time with Captain John Dagworthy, who commanded a detachment of Marylanders at the regiment's headquarters in Fort Cumberland. Washington, impatient for an offensive against Fort Duquesne, was convinced Braddock would have granted him a royal commission and pressed his case in February 1756 with Braddock's successor as Commander-in-Chief, William Shirley, and again in January 1757 with Shirley's successor, Lord Loudoun. Loudoun humiliated Washington, refused him a royal commission, and agreed only to relieve him of the responsibility of manning Fort Cumberland.

In 1758, the Virginia Regiment was assigned to the British Forbes Expedition to capture Fort Duquesne. General John Forbes took Washington's advice on some aspects of the expedition but rejected his opinion on the best route to the fort. Forbes nevertheless made Washington a brevet brigadier general and gave him command of one of the three brigades that was assigned to assault the fort. The French had abandoned the fort and the valley before the assault, however, and Washington only saw a friendly fire incident, which left 14 dead and 26 injured. Frustrated, he resigned his commission soon afterwards and returned to Mount Vernon.

Under Washington, the Virginia Regiment had defended 300 miles (480 km) of frontier against 20 Indian attacks in 10 months. He increased the professionalism of the regiment as it grew from 300 to 1,000 men. Though he failed to realize a royal commission, which made him hostile towards the British, he gained self-confidence, leadership skills, and knowledge of British military tactics. The destructive competition Washington witnessed among colonial politicians fostered his later support of a strong central government.

== Marriage, civilian and political life (1759–1775) ==
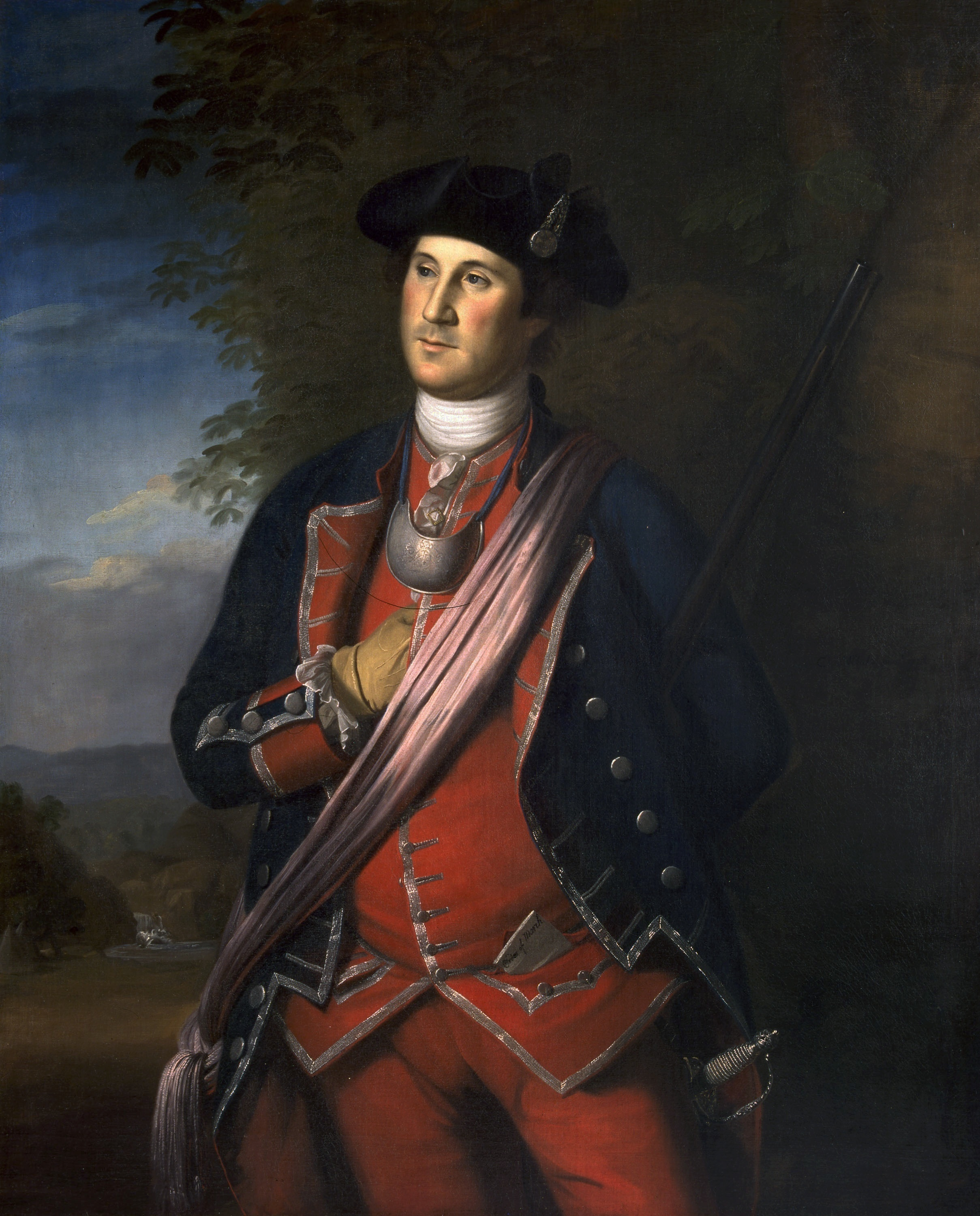
Colonel George Washington, a 1772 portrait of Washington by Charles Willson Peale

Martha Dandridge Custis, a 1757 portrait of Martha Washington by John Wollaston

On January 6, 1759, Washington, at age 26, married Martha Dandridge Custis, the 27-year-old widow of wealthy plantation owner Daniel Parke Custis. Martha was intelligent, gracious, and experienced in managing a planter's estate, and the couple had a happy marriage. They lived at Mount Vernon, where Washington cultivated tobacco and wheat. The marriage gave Washington control over Martha's one-third dower interest in the 18,000-acre (7,300 ha) Custis estate, and he managed the remaining two-thirds for Martha's children. As a result, he became one of the wealthiest men in Virginia, which increased his social standing.

At Washington's urging, Governor Lord Botetourt fulfilled Dinwiddie's 1754 promise to grant land bounties to those who served with volunteer militias during the French and Indian War. In late 1770, Washington inspected the lands in the Ohio and Great Kanawha regions, and he engaged surveyor William Crawford to subdivide it. Crawford allotted 23,200 acres (9,400 ha) to Washington, who told the veterans that their land was unsuitable for farming and agreed to purchase 20,147 acres (8,153 ha), leaving some feeling that they had been duped. He also doubled the size of Mount Vernon to 6,500 acres (2,600 ha) and, by 1775, had more than doubled its slave population to over one hundred.

As a respected military hero and large landowner, Washington held local offices and was elected to the Virginia provincial legislature, representing Frederick County in the Virginia House of Burgesses for seven years beginning in 1758. (Note: He had been defeated in his campaigns for the seat in 1755 and 1757.) Early in his legislative career, Washington rarely spoke at or even attended legislative sessions, but was more politically active starting in the 1760s, becoming a prominent critic of Britain's taxation and mercantilist policies towards the American colonies. Washington imported luxury goods from England, paying for them by exporting tobacco. His profligate spending combined with low tobacco prices left him £1,800 in debt by 1764. Washington's complete reliance on London tobacco buyer and merchant Robert Cary also threatened his economic security. (Note: In a letter of September 20, 1765, Washington protested to "Robert Cary & Co." regarding the low prices he received for his tobacco and the inflated prices he was forced to pay on second-rate goods from London.) Between 1764 and 1766, he sought to diversify his holdings: he changed Mount Vernon's primary cash crop from tobacco to wheat and expanded operations to include flour milling and hemp farming. Washington's stepdaughter Patsy suffered from epileptic attacks, and she died at Mount Vernon in 1773, allowing Washington to use part of the inheritance from her estate to settle his debts.

=== Opposition to the British Parliament and Crown ===
Washington was opposed to the taxes which the British Parliament imposed on the Colonies without proper representation. He believed the Stamp Act 1765 was oppressive and celebrated its repeal the following year. In response to the Townshend Acts, he introduced a proposal in May 1769 which urged Virginians to boycott British goods; the Townshend Acts were mostly repealed in 1770. Washington and other colonists were also angered by the Royal Proclamation of 1763 (which banned American settlement west of the Allegheny Mountains) and British interference in American western land speculation (in which Washington was a participant).

Parliament sought to punish Massachusetts colonists for their role in the Boston Tea Party in 1774 by passing the Coercive Acts, which Washington saw as "an invasion of our rights and privileges". That July, he and George Mason drafted a list of resolutions for the Fairfax County committee, including a call to end the Atlantic slave trade; the resolutions were adopted. In August, Washington attended the First Virginia Convention and was selected as a delegate to the First Continental Congress. As tensions rose in 1774, he helped train militias in Virginia and organized enforcement of the Continental Association boycott of British goods instituted by the Congress.

== Commander in chief of the army (1775–1783) ==
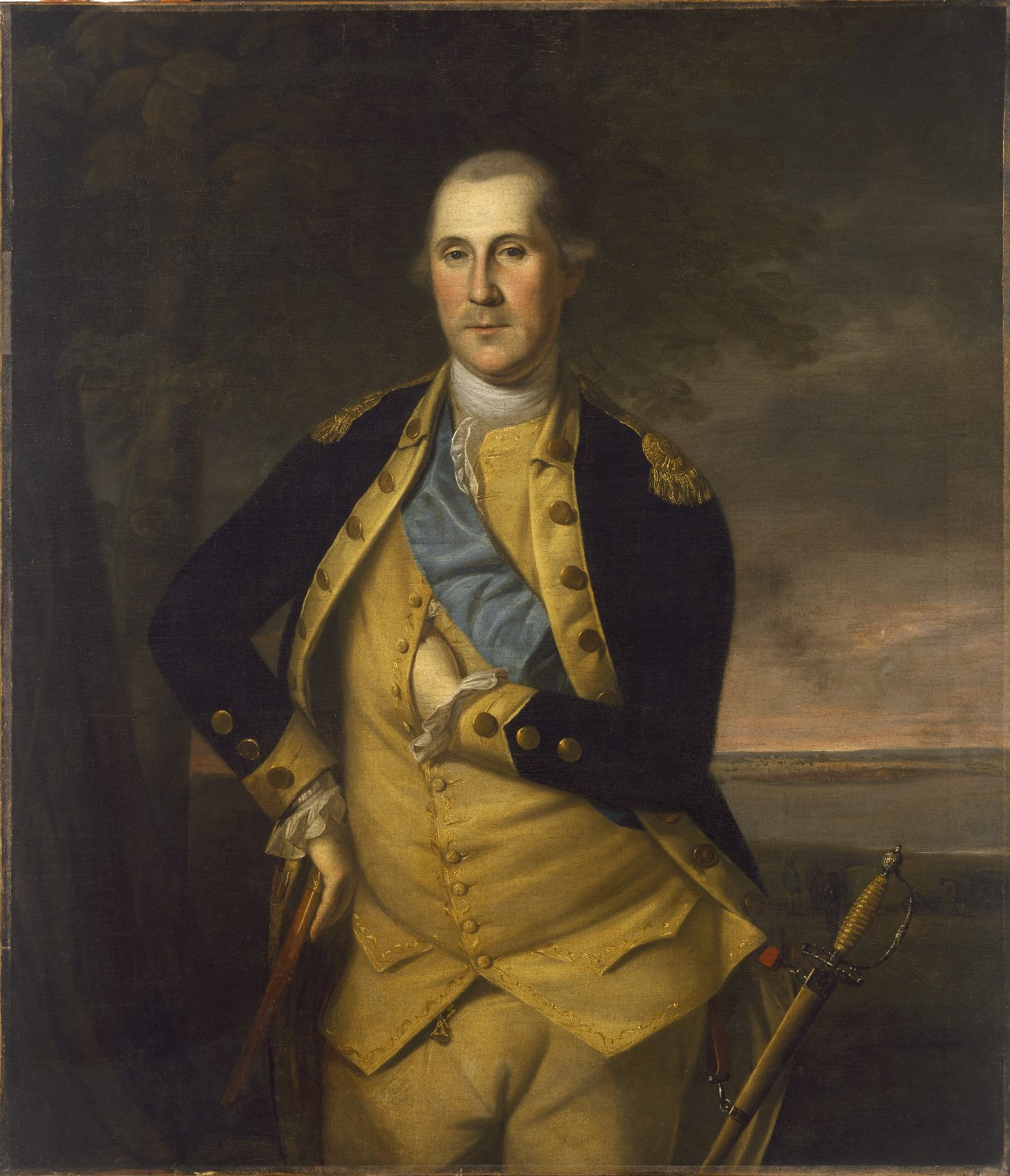
General Washington, Commander of the Continental Army, a 1776 portrait by Charles Willson Peale

The American Revolutionary War broke out on April 19, 1775, with the Battles of Lexington and Concord. Washington hastily departed Mount Vernon on May 4 to join the Second Continental Congress in Philadelphia. On June 14, Congress created the Continental Army and John Adams nominated Washington as its commander-in-chief, mainly because of his military experience and the belief that a Virginian would better unite the colonies. He was unanimously elected by Congress the next day. (Note: Other reasons Washington was perceived as the best choice for the commander role, according to Chernow, included his "superior presence, infinitely better judgment, more political cunning, and unmatched gravitas... he had the perfect temperament for leadership.") Washington gave an acceptance speech on June 16, declining a salary, though he was later reimbursed expenses.

Congress chose Washington's primary staff officers, including Artemas Ward, Horatio Gates, Charles Lee, Philip Schuyler, and Nathanael Greene. Henry Knox impressed Adams and Washington with his knowledge of ordnance and was promoted to colonel and chief of artillery. Similarly, Washington was impressed by Alexander Hamilton's intelligence and bravery; he would later promote Hamilton to colonel and appoint him his aide-de-camp.

Washington initially banned the enlistment of Black soldiers, both free and enslaved. The British saw an opportunity to divide the colonies: the colonial governor of Virginia issued a proclamation promising freedom to slaves if they joined the British forces. In response to this proclamation and the need for troops, Washington soon overturned his ban. By the end of the war, around one-tenth of the soldiers in the Continental Army were Black, with some obtaining freedom.

=== Siege of Boston ===
In April 1775, in response to the growing rebellious movement, British troops occupied Boston, led by General Thomas Gage, commander of British forces in America. Local militias surrounded the city and trapped the British troops, resulting in a standoff. As Washington headed for Boston, he was greeted by cheering crowds and political ceremony; he became a symbol of the Patriot cause. Upon Washington's arrival on July 2, he went to inspect the army, but found undisciplined militia. After consultation, he initiated Benjamin Franklin's suggested reforms, instituting military drills and imposing strict disciplinary measures. Washington promoted some of the soldiers who had performed well at Bunker Hill to officer rank, and removed officers who he saw as incompetent. In October, King George III declared that the colonies were in open rebellion and relieved Gage of command, replacing him with General William Howe.

When the Charles River froze over, Washington was eager to cross and storm Boston, but Gates and others were opposed to having untrained militia attempt to assault well-garrisoned fortifications. Instead, Washington agreed to secure the Dorchester Heights above Boston to try to force the British out. On March 17, 8,906 British troops, 1,100 Loyalists, and 1,220 women and children began a chaotic naval evacuation. Washington entered the city with 500 men, giving them explicit orders not to plunder. He refrained from exerting military authority in Boston, leaving civilian matters in the hands of local authorities. (Note: On January 24, 1776, Congressional delegate Edward Rutledge, echoing General George Washington's own concerns, suggested that a war office similar to Great Britain's be established. Organization of the Board of War underwent several significant changes after its inception in 1776.)

=== New York and New Jersey ===
==== Battle of Long Island ====
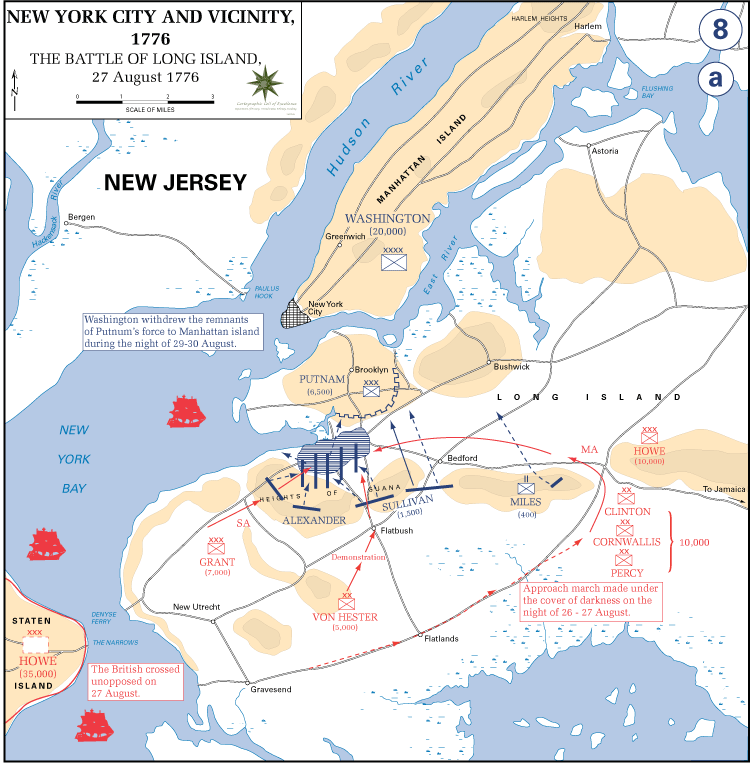
Map of the Battle of Long Island

After the victory at Boston, Washington correctly guessed that the British would return to New York City and retaliate. He arrived there on April 13, 1776, and ordered the construction of fortifications. He also ordered his forces to treat civilians and their property with respect, to avoid the abuses Bostonians suffered at the hands of British troops. The British forces, including more than a hundred ships and thousands of troops, began arriving on Staten Island in July to lay siege to the city.

Howe's troop strength totaled 32,000 regulars and Hessian auxiliaries; Washington had 23,000 men, mostly untrained recruits and militia. In August, Howe landed 20,000 troops at Gravesend, Brooklyn, and approached Washington's fortifications. Overruling his generals, Washington chose to fight, based on inaccurate information that Howe's army had only around 8,000 soldiers. In the Battle of Long Island, Howe assaulted Washington's flank and inflicted 1,500 Patriot casualties. Washington retreated to Manhattan.

Howe sent a message to Washington to negotiate peace, addressing him as "George Washington, Esq." Washington declined to accept the message, demanding to be addressed with diplomatic protocol—not as a rebel. Despite misgivings, Washington heeded the advice of General Greene to defend Fort Washington, but was ultimately forced to abandon it. Howe pursued and Washington retreated across the Hudson River to Fort Lee. In November, Howe captured Fort Washington. Loyalists in New York City considered Howe a liberator and spread a rumor that Washington had set fire to the city. Now reduced to 5,400 troops, Washington's army retreated through New Jersey.

==== Crossing the Delaware, Trenton, and Princeton ====
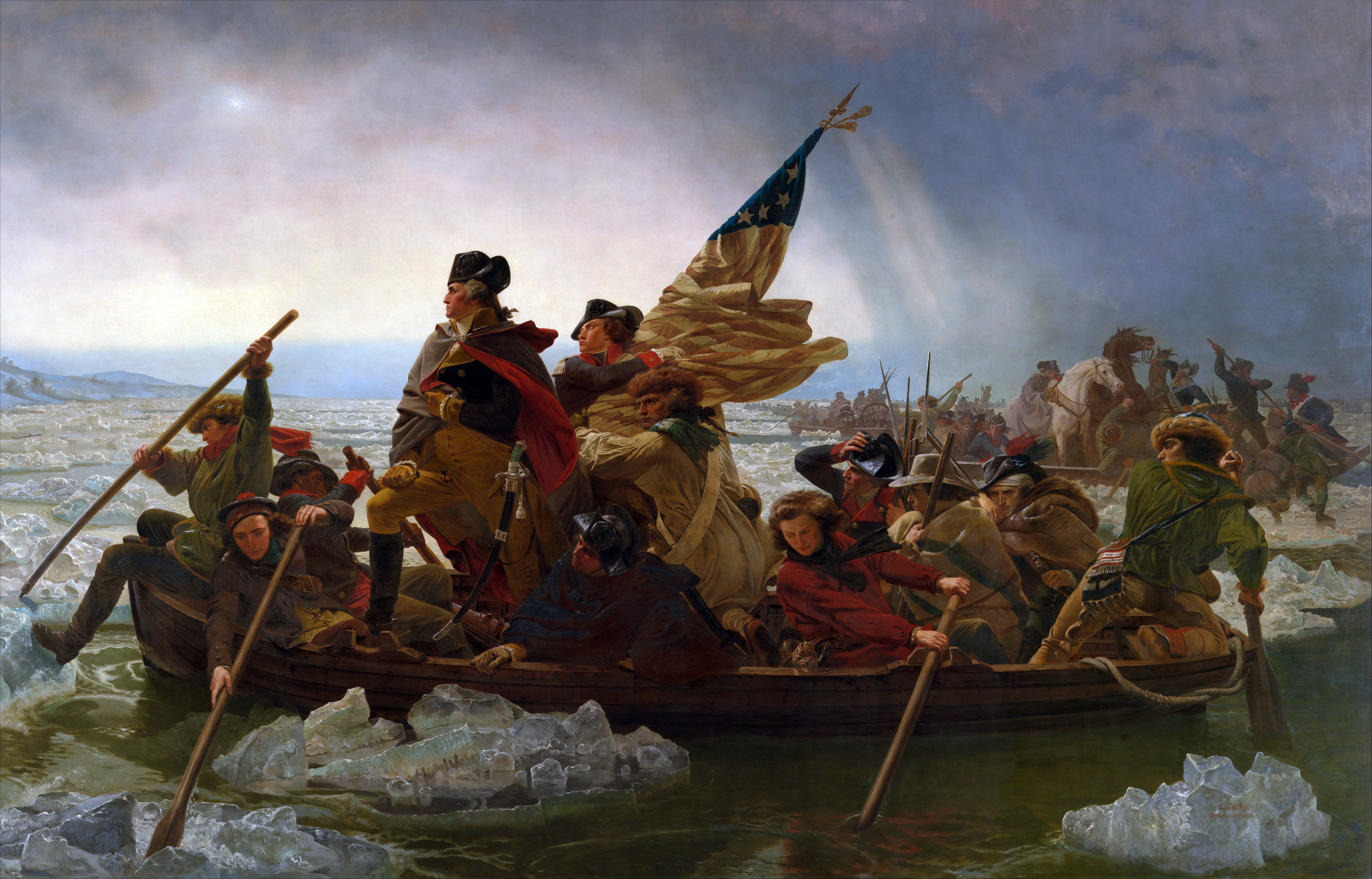
Washington Crossing the Delaware by Emanuel Leutze (1851)

Washington crossed the Delaware River into Pennsylvania, where General John Sullivan joined him with 2,000 more troops. The future of the Continental Army was in doubt due to a lack of supplies, a harsh winter, expiring enlistments, and desertions. Howe posted a Hessian garrison at Trenton to hold western New Jersey and the east shore of the Delaware. At sunrise on December 26, 1776, Washington, aided by Colonel Knox and artillery, led his men in a successful surprise attack on the Hessians.

Washington returned to New Jersey on January 3, 1777, launching an attack on the British regulars at Princeton, with 40 Americans killed or wounded and 273 British killed or captured. Howe retreated to New York City for the winter. Washington took up winter headquarters in Morristown, New Jersey. While there, he ordered William Shippen to inoculate all soldiers who had not previously had smallpox; Chernow wrote that "this enlightened decision was as important as any military measure Washington adopted during the war".

Strategically, Washington's victories at Trenton and Princeton were pivotal. They revived Patriot morale and quashed the British strategy of showing overwhelming force followed by offering generous terms, changing the course of the war.

=== Philadelphia ===
==== Brandywine, Germantown, and Saratoga ====
In July 1777, the British general John Burgoyne led his British troops south from Quebec in the Saratoga campaign; he recaptured Fort Ticonderoga, intending to divide New England. However, General Howe took his army from New York City south to Philadelphia rather than joining Burgoyne near Albany. Washington and Gilbert, Marquis de Lafayette rushed to Philadelphia to engage Howe. In the Battle of Brandywine on September 11, 1777, Howe outmaneuvered Washington and marched unopposed into the American capital at Philadelphia. A Patriot attack against the British at Germantown in October failed.

In Upstate New York, the Patriots were led by General Horatio Gates. Concerned about Burgoyne's movements southward, Washington sent reinforcements north with Generals Benedict Arnold and Benjamin Lincoln. On October 7, 1777, Burgoyne tried to take Bemis Heights but was isolated from support and forced to surrender. Gates' victory emboldened Washington's critics, who favored Gates as a military leader. According to the biographer John Alden, "It was inevitable that the defeats of Washington's forces and the concurrent victory of the forces in upper New York should be compared." Admiration for Washington was waning.

==== Valley Forge and Monmouth ====
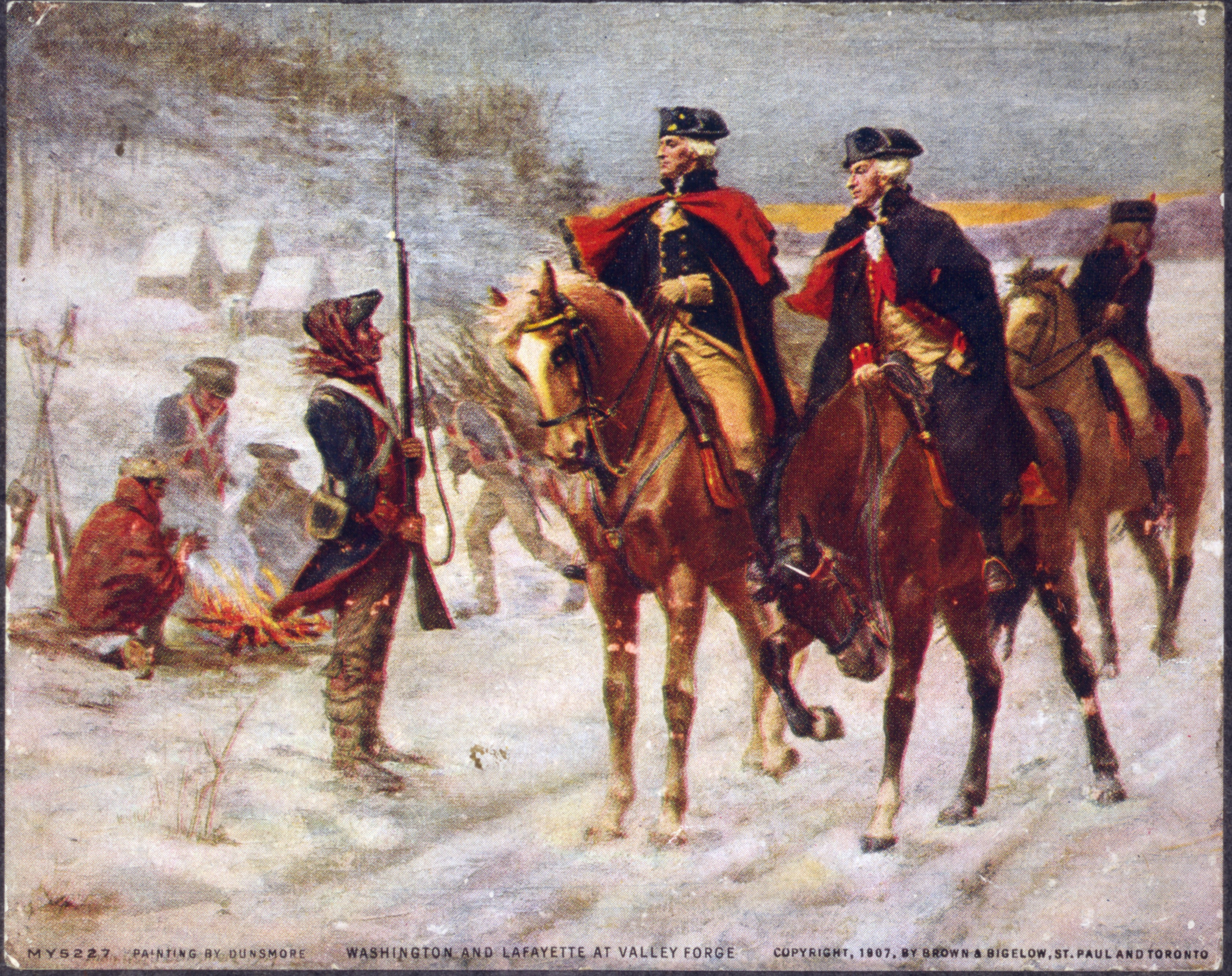
Washington and Lafayette at Valley Forge, a 1907 painting by John Ward Dunsmore

Washington and his army of 11,000 men went into winter quarters at Valley Forge north of Philadelphia in December 1777. There they lost between 2,000 and 3,000 men as a result of disease and lack of food, clothing, and shelter, reducing the army to below 9,000 men. By February, Washington was facing low troop morale and increased desertions. An internal revolt by his officers prompted some members of Congress to consider removing Washington from command. Washington's supporters resisted, and the matter was ultimately dropped.

Washington made repeated petitions to Congress for provisions and expressed the urgency of the situation to a congressional delegation. Congress agreed to strengthen the army's supply lines and reorganize the quartermaster and commissary departments, while Washington launched the Grand Forage of 1778 (Note: See, for example, Todd W. Braisted, Grand Forage 1778, Westholme Publishing, 2016.) to collect food from the surrounding region. Meanwhile, Baron Friedrich Wilhelm von Steuben's incessant drilling transformed Washington's recruits into a disciplined fighting force. Washington appointed him Inspector General.

In early 1778, the French entered into a Treaty of Alliance with the Americans. In May, Howe resigned and was replaced by Sir Henry Clinton. The British evacuated Philadelphia for New York that June and Washington summoned a war council of American and French generals. He chose to order a limited strike on the retreating British. Generals Lee and Lafayette moved with 4,000 men, without Washington's knowledge, and bungled their first strike on June 28. Washington relieved Lee and achieved a draw after an expansive battle. The British continued their retreat to New York. This battle "marked the end of the war's campaigning in the northern and middle states. Washington would not fight the British in a major engagement again for more than three years". British attention shifted to the Southern theatre; in late 1778, General Clinton captured Savannah, Georgia, a key port in the American South. Washington, meanwhile, ordered an expedition against the Haudenosaunee (Iroquois), the Indigenous allies of the British, destroying their villages.

=== Espionage and West Point ===
Washington became America's first spymaster by designing an espionage system against the British. In 1778, Major Benjamin Tallmadge formed the Culper Ring at Washington's direction to covertly collect information about the British in New York. Intelligence from the Culper Ring saved French forces from a surprise British attack, which was itself based on intelligence from Washington's general turned British spy Benedict Arnold.

Washington had disregarded incidents of disloyalty by Arnold, who had distinguished himself in many campaigns, including the invasion of Quebec. In 1779, Arnold began supplying the British spymaster John André with sensitive information intended to allow the British to capture West Point, a key American defensive position on the Hudson River. On September 21, Arnold gave André plans to take over the garrison. André was captured by militia who discovered the plans, after which Arnold escaped to New York. On being told about Arnold's treason, Washington recalled the commanders positioned under Arnold at key points around the fort to prevent any complicity. He assumed personal command at West Point and reorganized its defenses.

=== Southern theater and Yorktown ===
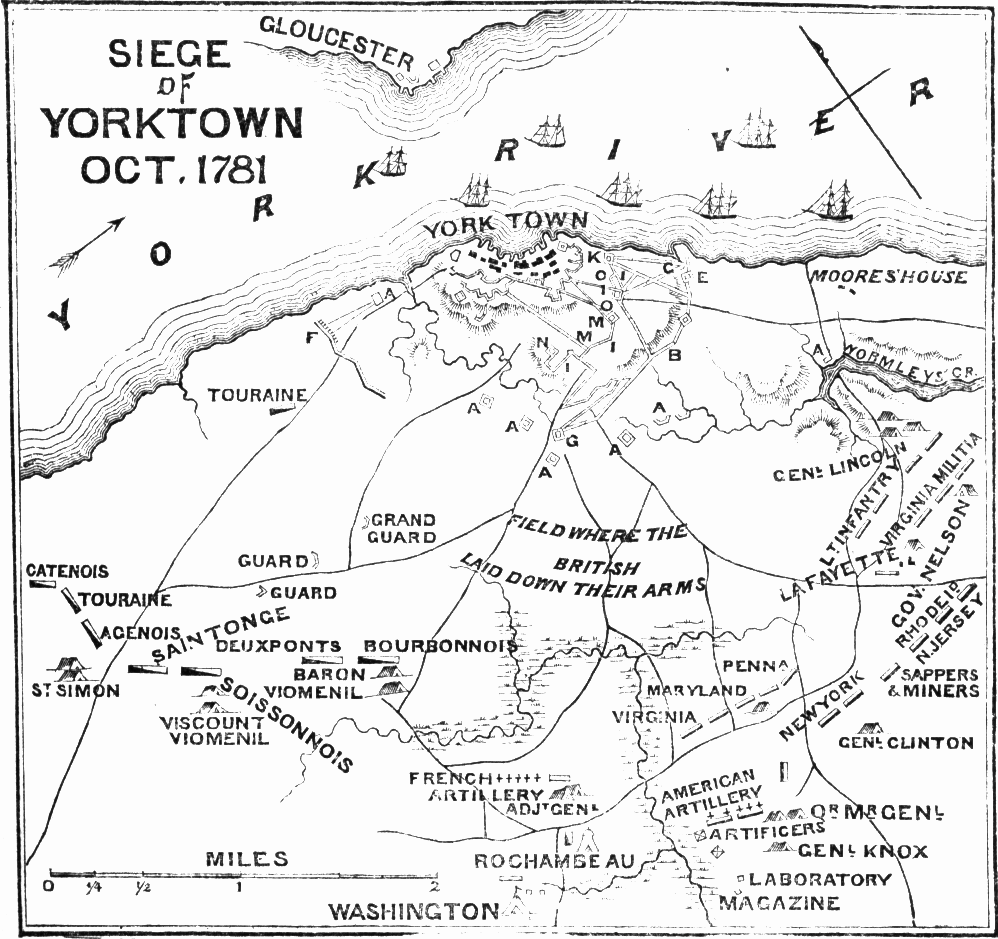
Map of the Siege of Yorktown

By June 1780, the British had occupied the South Carolina Piedmont and had firm control of the South. Washington was reinvigorated, however, when Lafayette returned from France with more ships, men, and supplies, and 5,000 veteran French troops led by Marshal Rochambeau arrived at Newport, Rhode Island in July.

General Clinton sent Arnold, now a British brigadier general, to Virginia in December with 1,700 troops to capture Portsmouth and conduct raids on Patriot forces. Washington sent Lafayette south to counter Arnold's efforts. Washington initially hoped to bring the fight to New York, drawing the British forces away from Virginia and ending the war there, but Rochambeau advised him that Cornwallis in Virginia was the better target. On August 19, 1781, Washington and Rochambeau began a march to Yorktown, Virginia, known now as the "celebrated march". Washington was in command of an army of 7,800 Frenchmen, 3,100 militia, and 8,000 Continental troops. Inexperienced in siege warfare, he often deferred to the judgment of Rochambeau. Despite this, Rochambeau never challenged Washington's authority as the battle's commanding officer.

By late September, Patriot-French forces surrounded Yorktown, trapping the British Army, while the French navy emerged victorious at the Battle of the Chesapeake. The final American offensive began with a shot fired by Washington. The siege ended with a British surrender on October 19, 1781; over 7,000 British soldiers became prisoners of war. Washington negotiated the terms of surrender for two days, and the official signing ceremony took place on October 19. Although the peace treaty was not negotiated for two more years, Yorktown proved to be the last significant battle of the Revolutionary War, with the British Parliament agreeing to cease hostilities in March 1782.

=== Demobilization and resignation ===
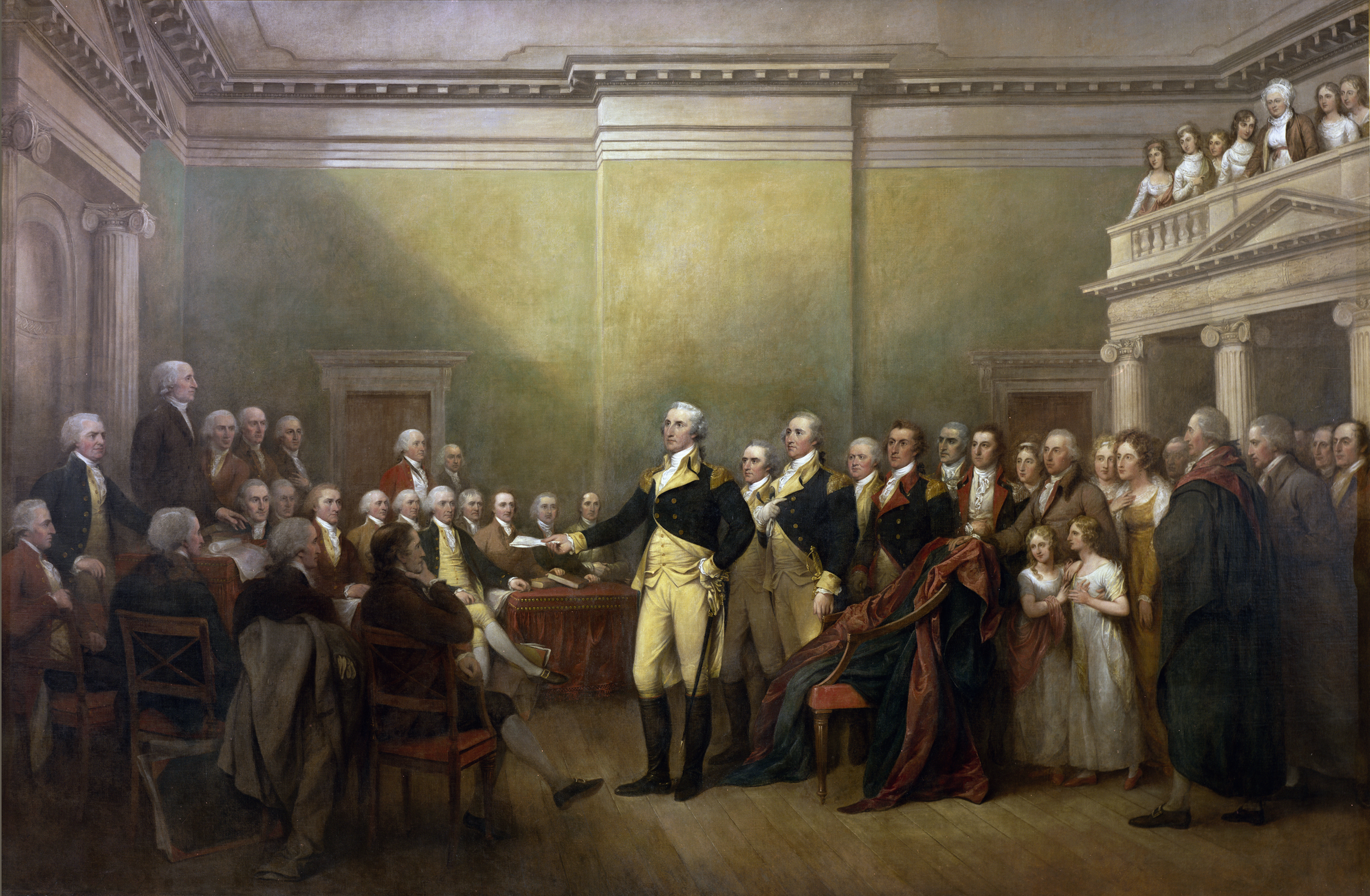
General George Washington Resigning His Commission, an 1824 portrait by John Trumbull

When peace negotiations began in April 1782, both the British and French began gradually evacuating their forces. In March 1783, Washington successfully calmed the Newburgh Conspiracy, a planned mutiny by American officers dissatisfied with a lack of pay. Washington submitted an account of $450,000 in expenses which he had advanced to the army. The account was settled, though it was vague about large sums and included expenses his wife had incurred through visits to his headquarters.

When the Treaty of Paris was signed on September 3, 1783, Britain officially recognized American independence. Washington disbanded his army, giving a farewell address to his soldiers on November 2. He oversaw the evacuation of British forces in New York and was greeted by parades and celebrations.

In early December 1783, Washington bade farewell to his officers at Fraunces Tavern and resigned as commander-in-chief soon after. In a final appearance in uniform, he gave a statement to the Congress: "I consider it an indispensable duty to close this last solemn act of my official life, by commending the interests of our dearest country to the protection of Almighty God, and those who have the superintendence of them, to His holy keeping." Washington's resignation was acclaimed at home and abroad, "extolled by later historians as a signal event that set the country's political course" according to the historian Edward J. Larson. (Note: Thomas Jefferson praised Washington for his "moderation and virtue" in relinquishing command. Reportedly, upon being informed of Washington's plans by painter Benjamin West, King George III remarked: "If he does that, he will be the greatest man in the world.") The same month, Washington was appointed president-general of the Society of the Cincinnati, a newly established hereditary fraternity of Revolutionary War officers.

== Early republic (1783–1789) ==
=== Return to Mount Vernon ===
"I am not only retired from all public employments but I am retiring within myself, and shall be able to view the solitary walk and tread the paths of private life with heartfelt satisfaction ... I will move gently down the stream of life, until I sleep with my fathers."

— George Washington in a letter to Lafayette.
February 1, 1784.

After spending just ten days at Mount Vernon out of 8 1/2 years of war, Washington was eager to return home. He arrived on Christmas Eve; Professor John E. Ferling wrote that he was delighted to be "free of the bustle of a camp and the busy scenes of public life". He received a constant stream of visitors paying their respects at Mount Vernon.

Washington reactivated his interests in the Great Dismal Swamp and Potomac Canal projects, begun before the war, though neither paid him any dividends. He undertook a 34-day, 680-mile (1,090 km) trip in 1784 to check on his land holdings in the Ohio Country. He oversaw the completion of remodeling work at Mount Vernon, which transformed his residence into the mansion that survives to this day—although his financial situation was not strong. Creditors paid him in depreciated wartime currency, and he owed significant amounts in taxes and wages. Mount Vernon had made no profit during his absence, and he saw persistently poor crop yields due to pestilence and bad weather. His estate recorded its eleventh year running at a deficit in 1787.

To make his estate profitable again, Washington undertook a new landscaping plan and succeeded in cultivating a range of fast-growing trees and native shrubs. He also began breeding mules after being gifted a stud by King Charles III of Spain in 1785; he believed that they would revolutionize agriculture.

=== Constitutional Convention of 1787 ===
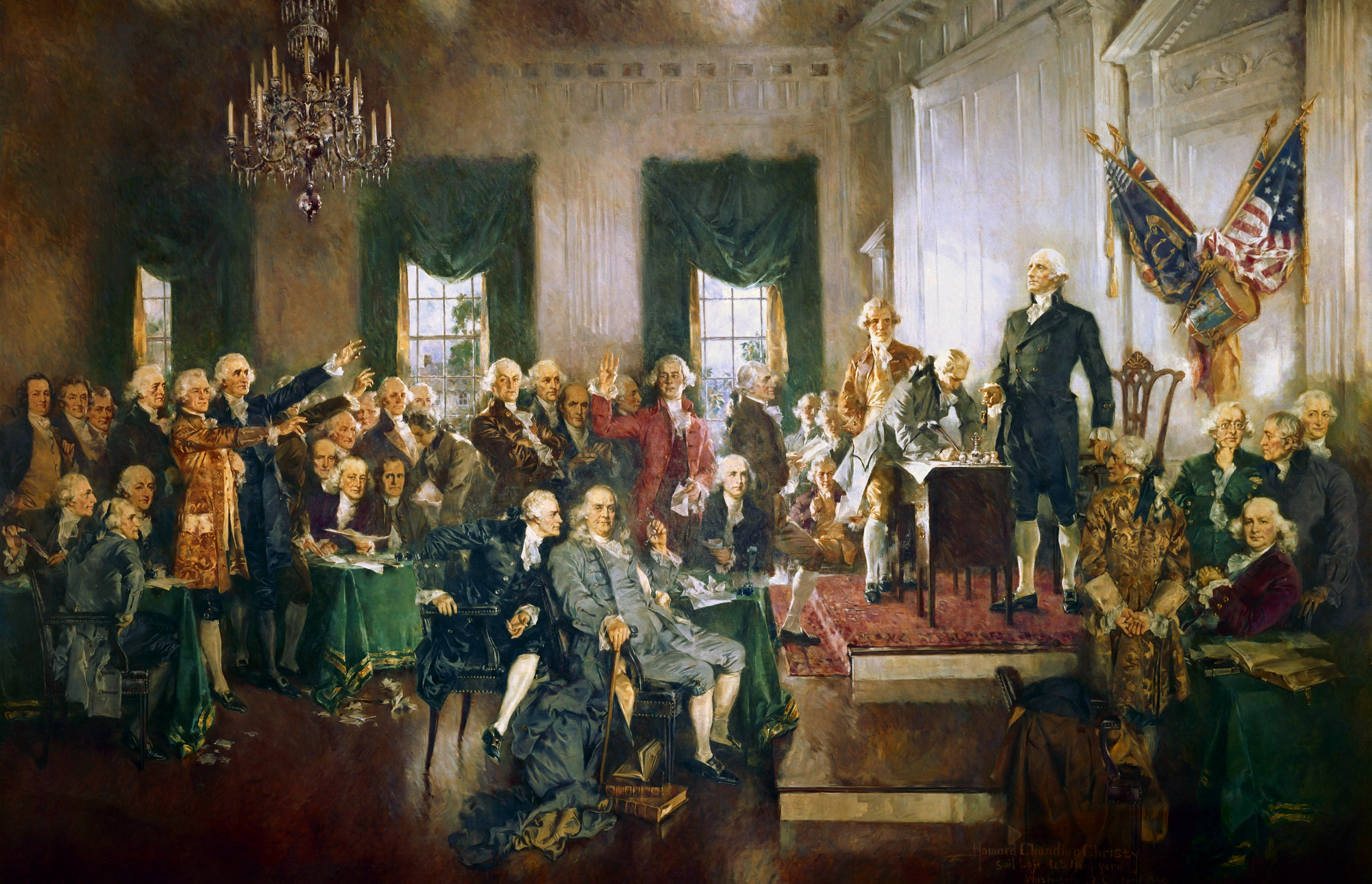
Scene at the Signing of the Constitution of the United States, a 1940 portrait by Howard Chandler Christy depicting Washington as the presiding officer at the Constitutional Convention in 1787

Before returning to private life in June 1783, Washington called for a strong union. Though he was concerned that he might be criticized for meddling in civil matters, he sent a circular letter to the states, maintaining that the Articles of Confederation were no more than "a rope of sand". He believed the nation was on the verge of "anarchy and confusion", was vulnerable to foreign intervention, and that a national constitution would unify the states under a strong central government.

When Shays's Rebellion erupted in Massachusetts in August 1786, Washington was further convinced that a national constitution was needed. Some nationalists feared that the new republic had descended into lawlessness, and they met on September 11, 1786, at Annapolis to ask the Congress to revise the Articles of Confederation. Congress agreed to a Constitutional Convention to be held in Philadelphia in 1787, with each state to send delegates. Washington was chosen to lead the Virginia delegation, but he declined. He had concerns about the legality of the convention and consulted James Madison, Henry Knox, and others. They persuaded him to attend as they felt his presence might induce reluctant states to send delegates and smooth the way for the ratification process while also giving legitimacy to the convention.

Washington arrived in Philadelphia on May 9, 1787, and the convention began on May 25. Benjamin Franklin nominated Washington to preside over the meeting, and he was unanimously elected. The delegate Edmund Randolph introduced Madison's Virginia Plan; it called for an entirely new constitution and a sovereign national government, which Washington highly recommended. However, details around representation were particularly contentious, resulting in a competing New Jersey Plan being brought forward. On July 10, Washington wrote to Alexander Hamilton: "I almost despair of seeing a favorable issue to the proceedings of our convention and do therefore repent having had any agency in the business." Nevertheless, he lent his prestige to the work of the other delegates, lobbying many to support the ratification of the Constitution. The final version adopted the Connecticut Compromise between the two plans, and was signed by 39 of 55 delegates on September 17, 1787.

=== First presidential election ===
Just prior to the first presidential election of 1789, in 1788 Washington was appointed chancellor of the College of William & Mary. He continued to serve through his presidency until his death. The delegates to the convention for the first presidential election anticipated a Washington presidency and left it to him to define the office once elected. When the state electors voted on February 4, 1789, Washington was unanimously elected, unique among U.S. presidents. John Adams was elected vice president. Despite writing that he felt "anxious and painful sensations" about leaving Mount Vernon, Washington departed for New York City on April 16.

== Presidency (1789–1797) ==
Washington cabinet
| Office | Name | Term |
| President | George Washington | 1789–1797 |
| Vice President | John Adams | 1789–1797 |
| Secretary of State | John Jay (acting) | 1789–1790 |
| Thomas Jefferson | 1790–1793 |
| Edmund Randolph | 1794–1795 |
| Timothy Pickering | 1795–1797 |
| Secretary of the Treasury | Alexander Hamilton | 1789–1795 |
| Oliver Wolcott Jr. | 1795–1797 |
| Secretary of War | Henry Knox | 1789–1794 |
| Timothy Pickering | 1795 |
| James McHenry | 1796–1797 |
| Attorney General | Edmund Randolph | 1789–1794 |
| William Bradford | 1794–1795 |
| Charles Lee | 1795–1797 |

=== First term ===
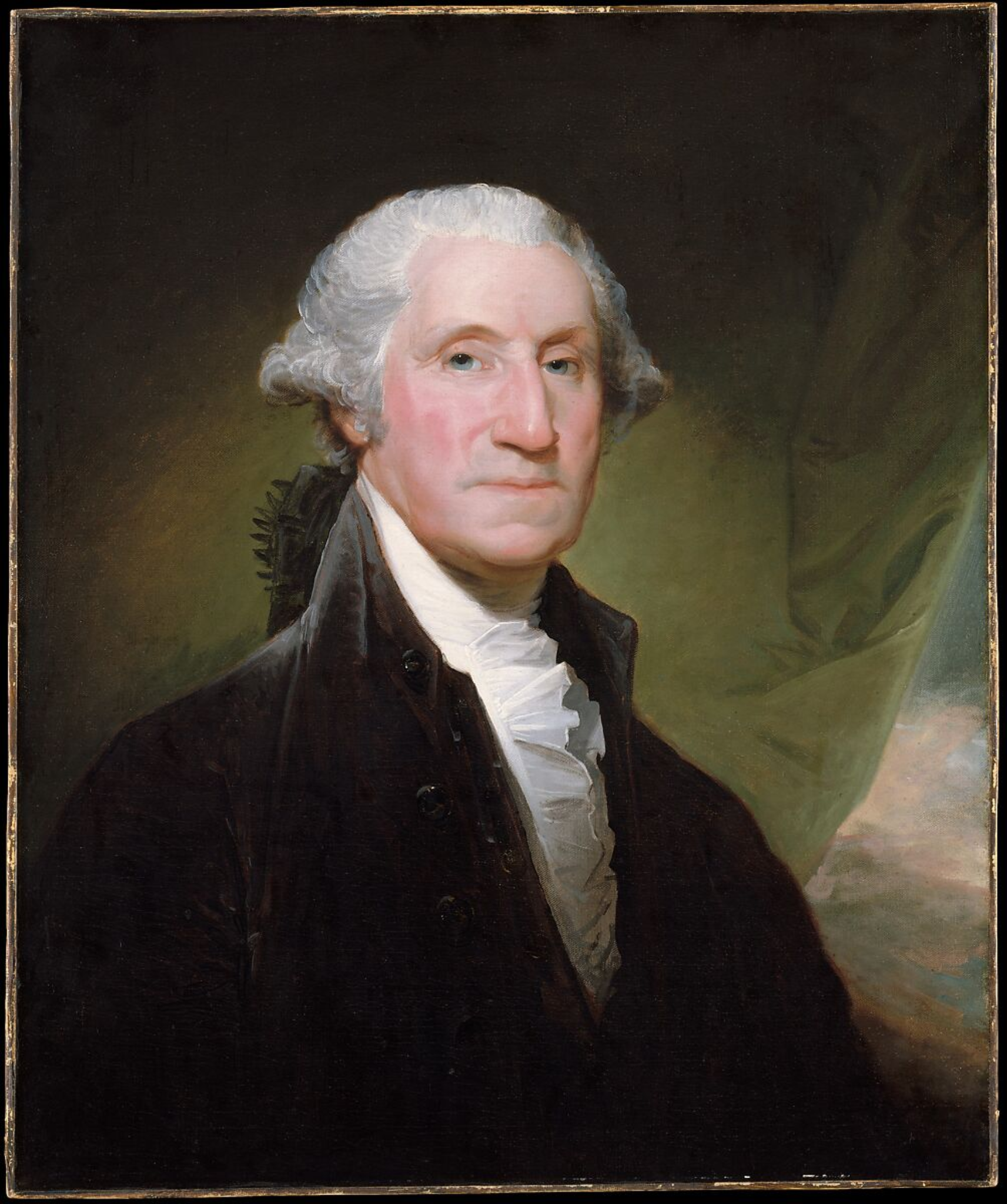
An early inaugural portrait, c. 1795, by Gilbert Stuart

Washington was inaugurated on April 30, 1789, taking the oath of office at Federal Hall in New York City. (Note: There has been debate over whether Washington added "so help me God" to the end of the oath.) His coach was led by militia and a marching band and followed by statesmen and foreign dignitaries in an inaugural parade, with a crowd of 10,000. Robert R. Livingston administered the oath, using a Bible provided by the Freemasons. Washington read a speech in the Senate Chamber, asking "that Almighty Being ... consecrate the liberties and happiness of the people of the United States". Though he wished to serve without a salary, Congress insisted that he receive one, providing Washington $25,000 annually (compared to $5,000 annually for the vice president).

Washington wrote to James Madison: "As the first of everything in our situation will serve to establish a precedent, it is devoutly wished on my part that these precedents be fixed on true principles." To that end, he argued against the majestic titles proposed by the Senate, including "His Majesty" and "His Highness the President", in favor of "Mr. President". His executive precedents included the inaugural address, messages to Congress, and the cabinet form of the executive branch. He also selected the first justices for the Supreme Court.

Washington was an able administrator and judge of talent and character. The old Confederation lacked the powers to handle its workload and had weak leadership, no executive, a small bureaucracy of clerks, large debt, worthless paper money, and no power to establish taxes. Congress created executive departments in 1789, including the State Department, the War Department, and the Treasury Department. Washington appointed Edmund Randolph as Attorney General, Samuel Osgood as Postmaster General, Thomas Jefferson as Secretary of State, Henry Knox as Secretary of War, and Alexander Hamilton as Secretary of the Treasury. Washington's cabinet became a consulting and advisory body, not mandated by the Constitution. Washington restricted cabinet discussions to topics of his choosing and expected department heads to agreeably carry out his decisions. He exercised restraint in using his veto power, writing that "I give my Signature to many Bills with which my Judgment is at variance."

Washington opposed political factionalism and remained non-partisan throughout his presidency (the only United States president to do so). He was sympathetic to a federalist form of government. Washington's closest advisors formed two factions, portending the First Party System. Hamilton formed the Federalist Party to promote national credit and a financially powerful nation. Jefferson opposed Hamilton's agenda and founded the Jeffersonian Republicans. Washington favored Hamilton's agenda, however, and it ultimately went into effect—resulting in bitter controversy.

Other domestic issues during Washington's first term included the planning of a permanent capital, the passage of several constitutional amendments including the Bill of Rights, and continuing debates concerning slavery and expansion into Native American territory. Washington proclaimed November 26, 1789, as a day of Thanksgiving to encourage national unity.

=== Second term ===
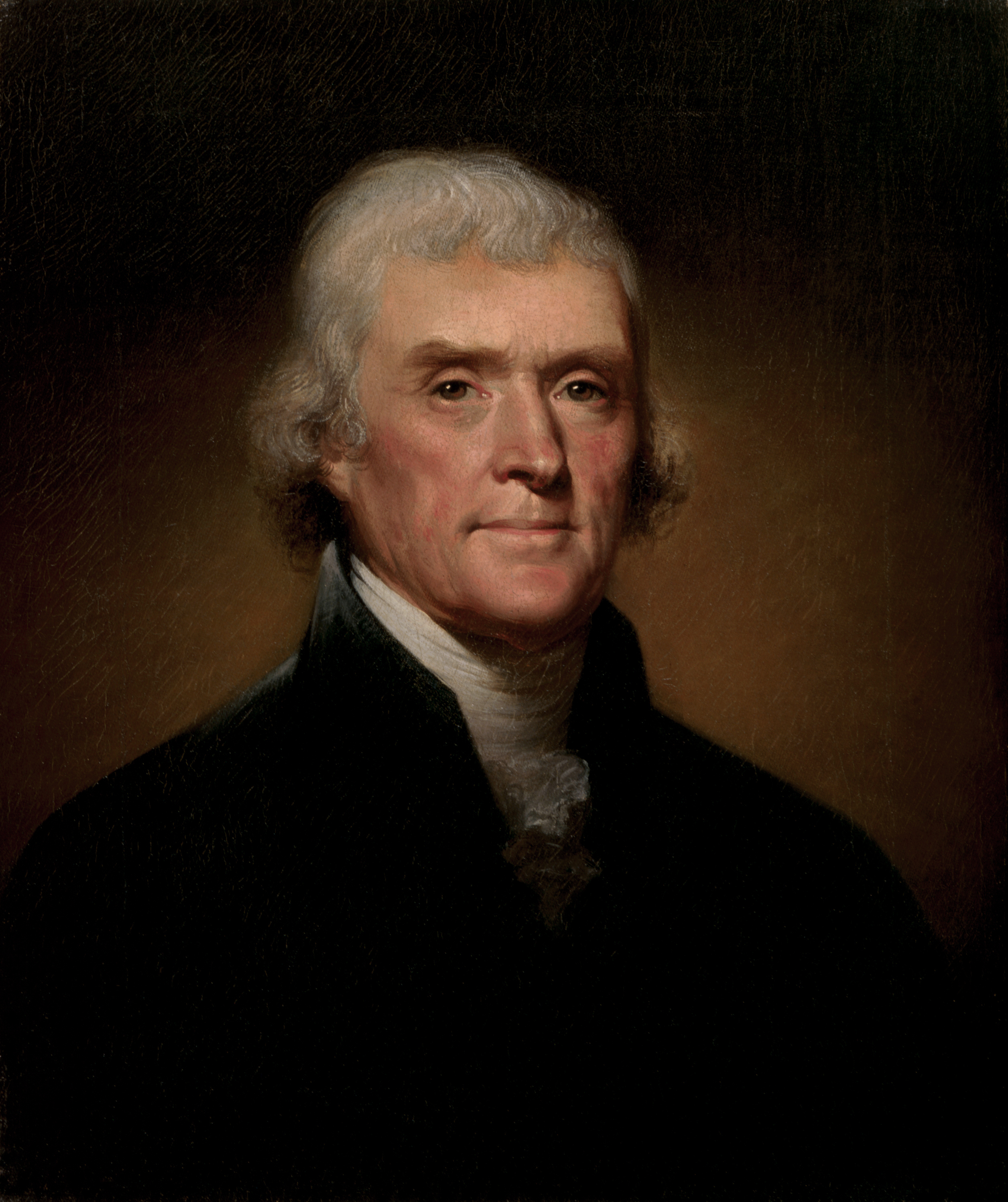
Portrait of Thomas Jefferson

Washington initially planned to retire after his first term, weary of office and in poor health. After dealing with the infighting in his cabinet and with partisan critics, he showed little enthusiasm for a second term, and Martha wanted him not to run. Washington's nephew George Augustine Washington, managing Mount Vernon in his absence, was critically ill, further increasing Washington's desire to retire. Many, however, urged him to run for a second term. Madison told him that his absence would allow the dangerous political rift in his cabinet and the House to worsen. Jefferson also pleaded with him not to retire, pledging to drop his attacks on Hamilton. Hamilton maintained that Washington's absence would be "deplored as the greatest evil" to the country. With the election of 1792 nearing, Washington agreed to run. On February 13, 1793, the Electoral College unanimously re-elected Washington president, while John Adams was re-elected as vice president by a vote of 77 to 50. Washington was sworn into office by Associate Justice William Cushing on March 4, 1793, in Congress Hall in Philadelphia.

On April 22, 1793, after the French Revolutionary Wars broke out, Washington issued a proclamation declaring American neutrality. He was resolved to pursue "a conduct friendly and impartial toward the belligerent Powers" while warning Americans not to intervene in the conflict. Although Washington recognized France's revolutionary government, he eventually asked that the French minister to the United States, Edmond-Charles Genêt, be recalled. Genêt was a diplomatic troublemaker who was openly hostile toward Washington's neutrality policy. He procured four American ships as privateers to strike at Spanish forces (British allies) in Florida while organizing militias to strike at other British possessions. However, his efforts failed to draw the United States into the conflict.

During his second term Washington faced two major domestic conflicts. The first was the Whiskey Rebellion (1791–1794), a Pennsylvania revolt against liquor taxation. Washington mobilized a militia and personally commanded an expedition against the rebels which suppressed the insurgency. The second was the Northwest Indian War between White settlers and Native Americans who were supported by the British; the latter were stationed in forts that they had refused to abandon after the Revolutionary War. In 1794 American troops defeated the Native American forces at the Battle of Fallen Timbers, ending the conflict between the two.

Hamilton formulated the Jay Treaty to normalize trade relations with Britain while removing them from western forts, and also to resolve financial debts remaining from the Revolution. Chief Justice John Jay represented Washington's position and signed the treaty on November 19, 1794. Washington supported the treaty because it avoided war, although he was disappointed that its provisions favored Britain. He mobilized public opinion and secured ratification but faced frequent public criticism and political controversy. Following the British abandonment of their forts around the Great Lakes, the proposed position of the Canada–United States border was sent to arbitration. Numerous pre-Revolution debts were settled and the British opened the British West Indies to American merchants. The agreement secured peace with Britain and a decade of prosperous trade; however, Jefferson claimed that it angered France and "invited rather than avoided" war. Jefferson's claim was verified when relations with France deteriorated after the signing of the treaty, with the French Directory authorizing the seizure of American ships two days before Washington's term ended. Succeeding president John Adams was left with the prospect of war. Relations with the Spanish were more successful: Thomas Pinckney negotiated the Treaty of San Lorenzo in 1795, settling the border between the United States and Spanish territory, and guaranteeing American navigational access to the Mississippi River.

On July 31, 1793, Jefferson submitted his resignation from cabinet. Hamilton resigned from office in January 1795 and was replaced by Oliver Wolcott Jr. Washington's relationship with Secretary of War Henry Knox deteriorated over rumors that Knox had profited from contracts for the construction of U.S. frigates ostensibly commissioned to combat Barbary pirates under the Naval Act of 1794. Knox was forced to resign. In the final months of his presidency, Washington was assailed by his political foes and a partisan press who accused him of being ambitious and greedy. He came to regard the press as a disuniting force. Washington also opposed demands by Congress to see papers related to the Jay Treaty, arguing that they were not "relative to any purpose under the cognizance of the House of Representatives, except that of an impeachment, which the resolution has not expressed."

=== Farewell Address ===
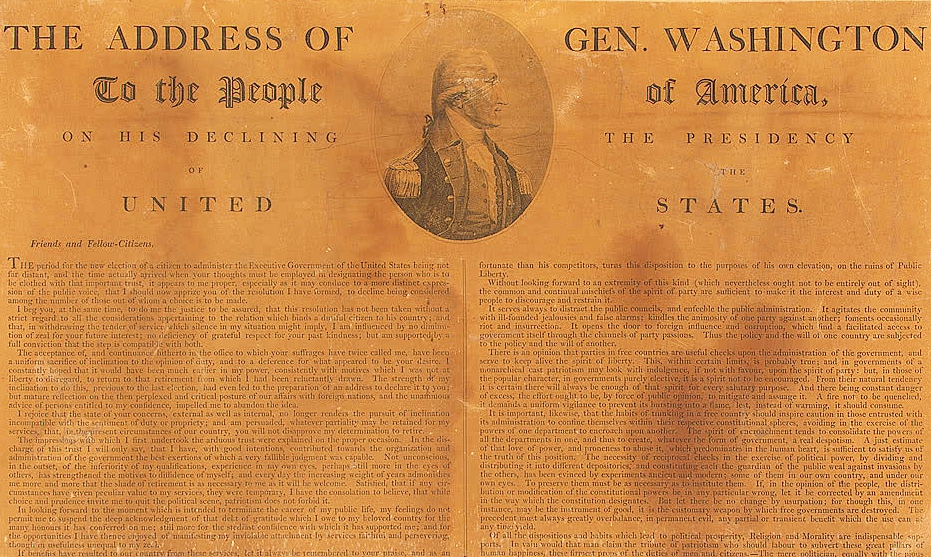
Washington's Farewell Address, published by the American Daily Advertiser on September 19, 1796

At the end of his second term, Washington retired. He was dismayed with the personal attacks against him and wanted to ensure that a truly contested presidential election could be held. He did not feel bound to a two-term limit, but his retirement set a significant precedent. In May 1792, in anticipation of his retirement, Washington instructed James Madison to prepare a "valedictory address", an initial draft of which was entitled the "Farewell Address". In May 1796, Washington sent the manuscript to Hamilton, who did an extensive rewrite, while Washington provided final edits. On September 19, 1796, David Claypoole's American Daily Advertiser published the address.

Washington stressed that national identity was paramount, and said that the "name of AMERICAN... must always exalt the just pride of patriotism". Washington warned against the dangers of political parties and entangling foreign alliances with domestic affairs. He counseled friendship and commerce with all nations, but advised against involvement in European wars. He stressed the importance of religion, asserting that "religion and morality are indispensable supports" in a republic.

He closed the address by reflecting on his legacy: "I fervently beseech the Almighty to avert or mitigate the evils to which [my unintentioned errors] may tend. I shall also carry with me the hope that my country will never cease to view them with indulgence, and that, after forty-five years of my life dedicated to its service with an upright zeal, the faults of incompetent abilities will be consigned to oblivion, as myself must soon be to the mansions of rest." After initial publication, many Republicans, including Madison, criticized the address and described it as an anti-French campaign document, with Madison believing that Washington was strongly pro-British. In 1972, the Washington scholar James Flexner referred to the Farewell Address as receiving as much acclaim as Thomas Jefferson's Declaration of Independence and Abraham Lincoln's Gettysburg Address. In 2010, Chernow called the "Farewell Address" one of the most influential statements on republicanism.

== Post-presidency (1797–1799) ==
=== Retirement ===
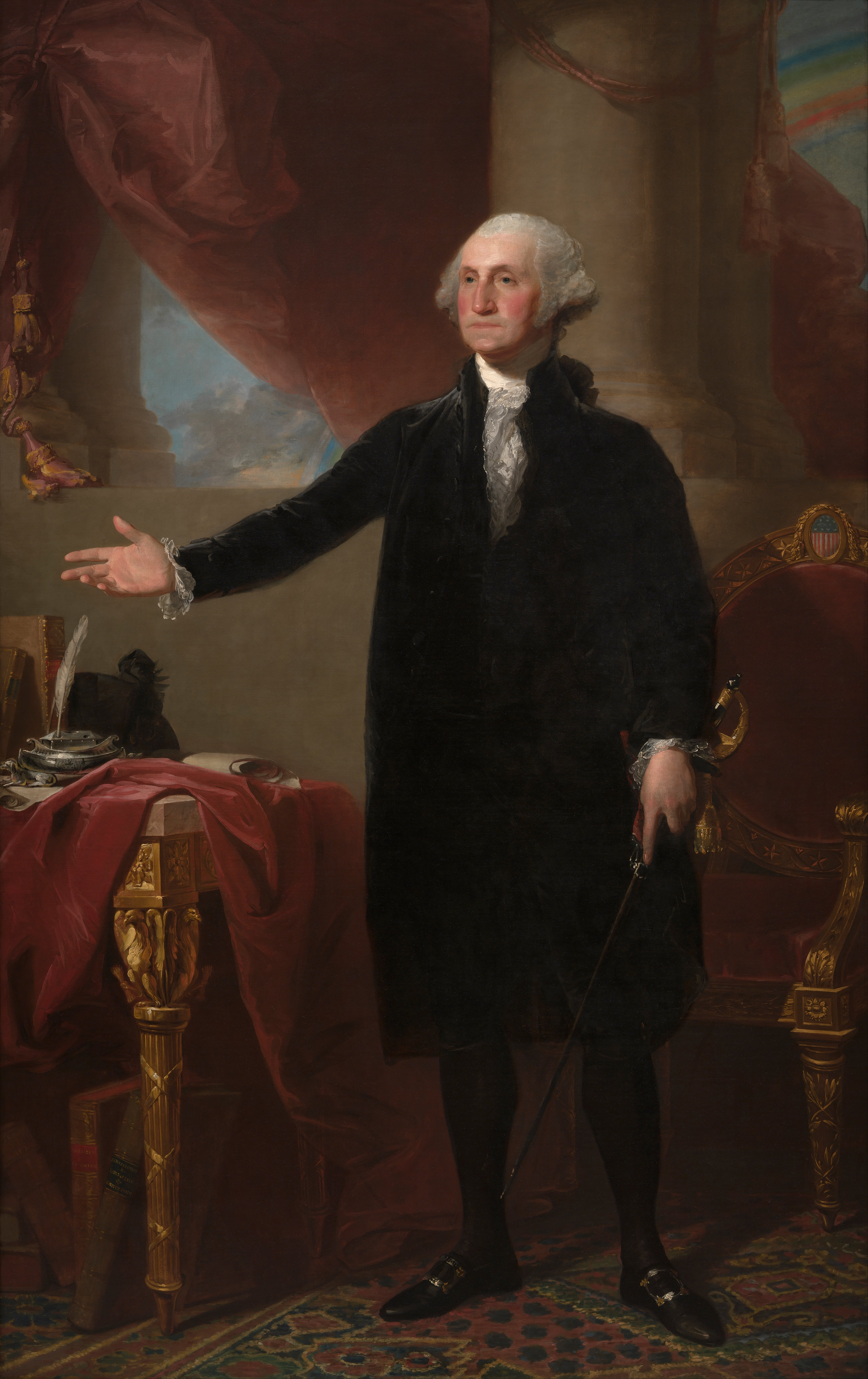
Lansdowne Portrait, c. 1796

When Washington retired to Mount Vernon in March 1797, he devoted time to his business interests, even though his plantation operations were only minimally profitable. Nearly all of his wealth was in the form of land and slaves rather than ready cash. To supplement his income, Washington erected a distillery for whiskey production using his enslaved workers.

He was a land speculator, buying parcels of land to spur development around the nearby new capital of Washington, D.C., (named in his honor in 1791), just up the Potomac River from Mount Vernon. He sold individual lots in the capital to middle-income investors rather than multiple lots to large investors, believing the former would be more likely to commit to making improvements. He held lands in the west (on the Piedmont), which yielded little income, and he unsuccessfully attempted to sell them. At the time of his death in 1799, he held title to more than 58,000 acres (23,000 ha) of land across Virginia, Ohio, Maryland, Pennsylvania, New York, Kentucky, and the Northwest Territory.

In retirement, Washington became an even more committed Federalist. He vocally supported the Alien and Sedition Acts and convinced Federalist John Marshall to run for Congress to weaken the Jeffersonian hold on Virginia. When French privateers began seizing American ships in 1798, and deteriorating relations led to the "Quasi-War". Washington wrote to Secretary of War James McHenry offering to organize President Adams' army. Adams nominated him for a lieutenant general commission and the position of commander-in-chief of the armies on July 4, 1798. Washington served as the commanding general from July 13, 1798, until his death 17 months later. He participated in planning but delegated the active leadership of the army to Hamilton. No army invaded the United States during this period, and Washington did not assume a field command.

=== Death ===
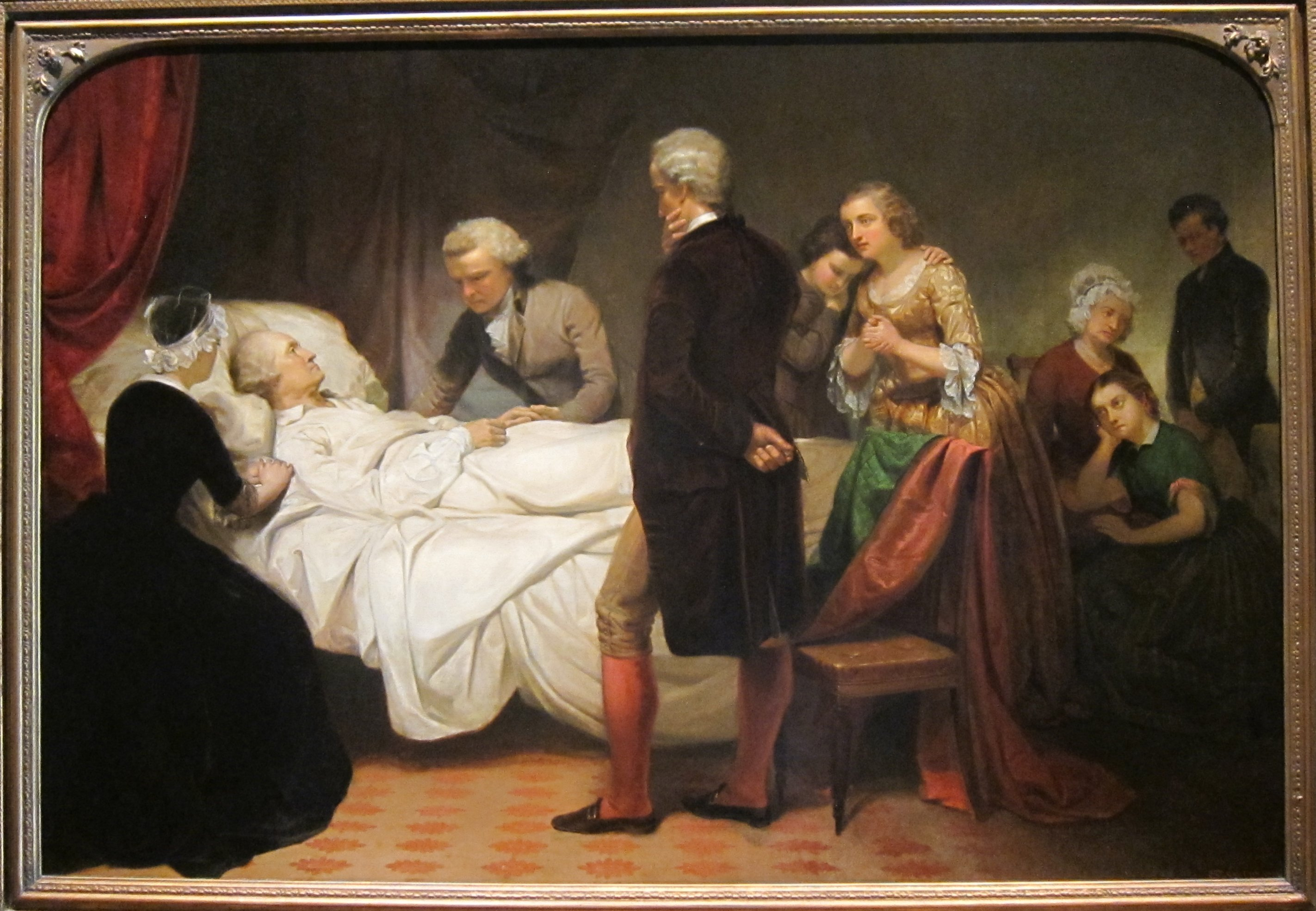
Washington on His Deathbed, an 1851 portrait by Junius Brutus Stearns

On December 12, 1799, Washington inspected his farms on horseback in inclement weather for five hours. He then dined with guests without putting on dry clothes. He had a sore throat the next day but was well enough to mark trees for cutting. Early the following morning, he awoke to an inflamed throat and difficulty breathing. As bloodletting was a common practice of the time, he ordered his estate overseer, George Rawlins, to remove nearly a pint of his blood. His family summoned doctors James Craik, Gustavus Richard Brown, and Elisha C. Dick. Brown initially believed Washington had quinsy; Dick thought the condition was a more serious "violent inflammation of the membranes of the throat". They continued bloodletting to approximately five pints, but Washington's condition deteriorated further. Dick proposed a tracheotomy; the other physicians were not familiar with that procedure and disapproved. Washington instructed Brown and Dick to leave the room, while he assured Craik, "Doctor, I die hard, but I am not afraid to go."

According to Lear, Washington died between 10 p.m. and 11 p.m. on December 14, 1799, with Martha seated at the foot of his bed. His last words were "'Tis well." The diagnosis of Washington's illness and the immediate cause of his death have been subjects of debate. The published account of Craik and Brown stated that his symptoms were consistent with "cynanche trachealis", a term then used to describe severe inflammation of the upper windpipe, including quinsy. (Note: The first account of Washington's death was written by doctors Craik and Brown, published in The Times of Alexandria five days after his death. The complete text can be found in The Eclectic Medical Journal (1858).) Accusations of medical malpractice have persisted since Washington's death. Modern medical authors have largely concluded that he likely died from severe epiglottitis complicated by the treatments he was given, which included multiple doses of calomel (a purgative) and extensive bloodletting, likely resulting in hypovolemic shock. (Note: Modern medical experts who blamed medical malpractice include Morens and Wallenborn in 1999, and Cheatham in 2008.)

=== Funeral and burial ===
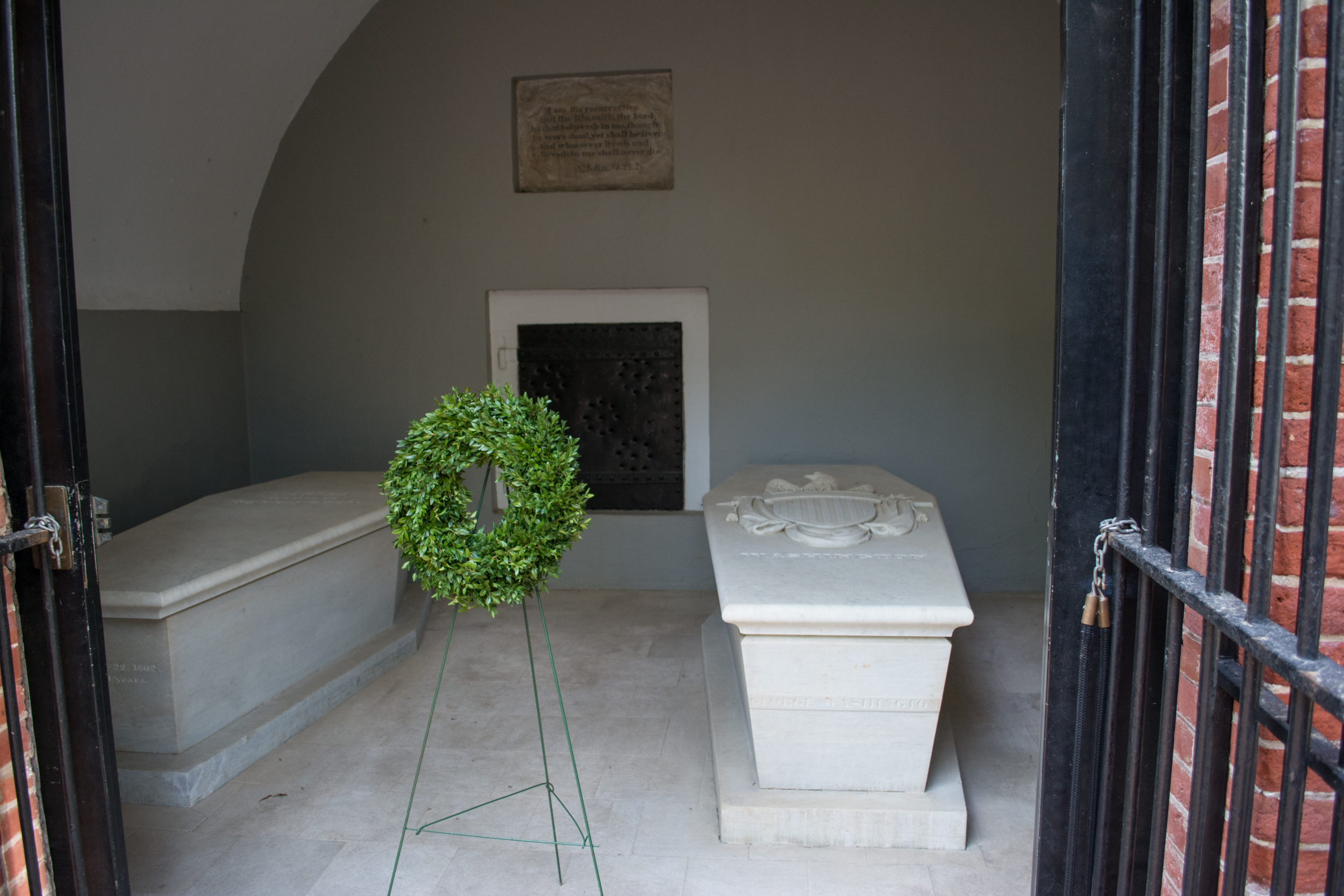
The sarcophagi of George (right) and Martha Washington at the entrance to their tomb in Mount Vernon

Washington was afraid of being entombed alive, instructing on his deathbed to private secretary Tobias Lear to wait three days before his burial. Washington's funeral was held on December 18, 1799, four days after his death, at Mount Vernon. Cavalry and foot soldiers led the procession, and six colonels served as the pallbearers. The Mount Vernon funeral service was restricted mostly to family and friends. Reverend Thomas Davis read a brief funeral service, followed by a ceremony performed by members of Washington's Masonic lodge; Washington had been a Freemason since 1752. Word of his death traveled slowly, but as it reached other regions, church bells rang and many businesses closed. Memorial processions were held in major cities of the United States. Martha burned her correspondence with Washington to protect its privacy, though five letters between the couple are known to have survived.

Washington was buried in the Washington family vault at Mount Vernon on December 18, 1799. In his will, Washington left instructions for the construction of a new vault; this was completed in 1831, after a disgruntled ex-employee of the estate attempted to steal what he thought was Washington's skull. In 1832, a joint Congressional committee debated moving his body from Mount Vernon to a crypt in the United States Capitol. Southern opposition was intense, antagonized by an ever-growing rift between North and South; many were concerned that Washington's remains could end up, in the words of Representative Wiley Thompson, on "a shore foreign to his native soil" if the country became divided, and Washington's remains stayed in Mount Vernon. On October 7, 1837, Washington's remains, still in the original lead coffin, were placed within a marble sarcophagus designed by William Strickland and constructed by John Struthers.

== Beliefs ==
=== Slavery ===
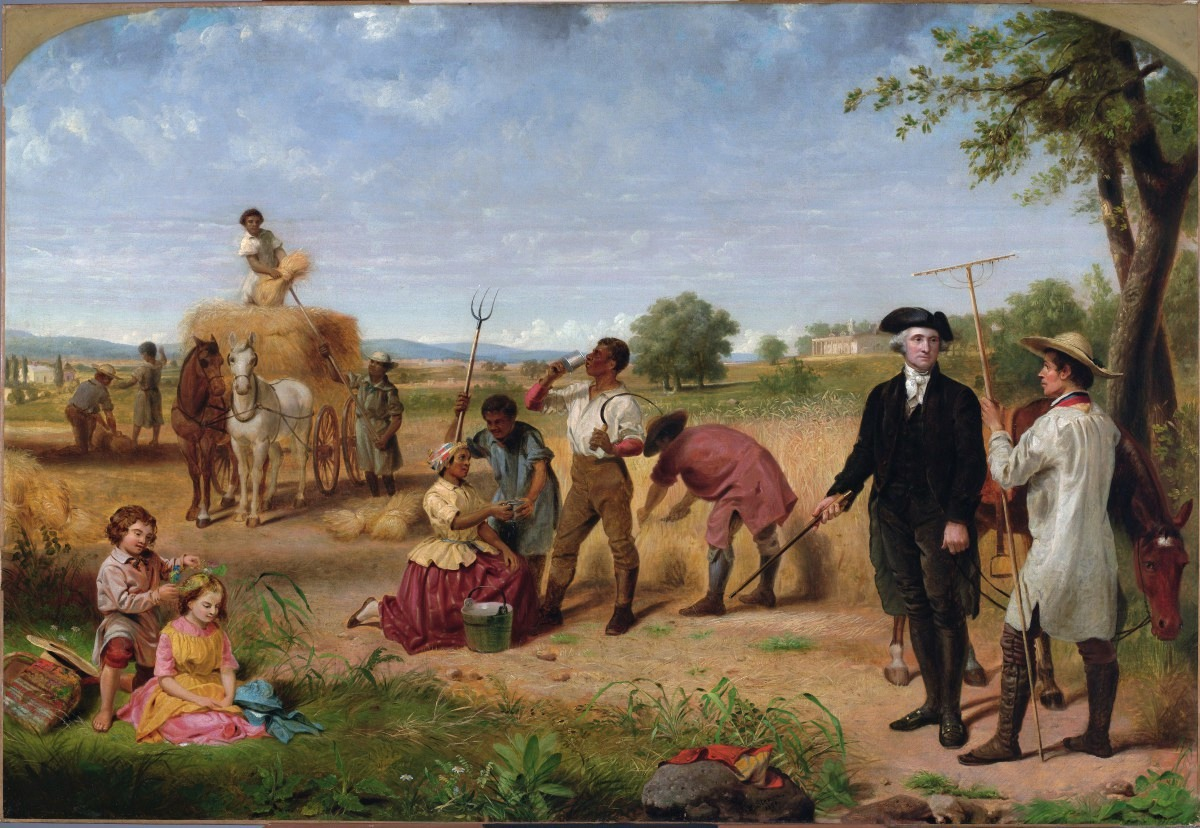
An 1851 portrait by Junius Brutus Stearns depicting an idealized version of plantation work

During Washington's lifetime at least 577 slaves lived and worked at Mount Vernon. He inherited some, gained control of 84 dower slaves upon his marriage to Martha, and purchased at least 71 slaves between 1752 and 1773. From 1786, he rented slaves as part of an agreement regarding a neighboring estate; they totaled 40 in 1799.

Slavery was deeply ingrained in the economic and social fabric of the Colony of Virginia. Prior to the Revolutionary War, Washington's views on slavery matched those of most Virginia planters of the time: "his principal interest was still their contribution to the economic life of the plantation." Beginning in the 1760s, however, Washington gradually grew to oppose it. His first doubts were prompted by his choice to transition from tobacco to grain crops, which left him with a costly surplus of slaves, causing him to question the system's economic efficiency. In a 1778 letter to Lund Washington, he made clear his desire "to get quit of Negroes".

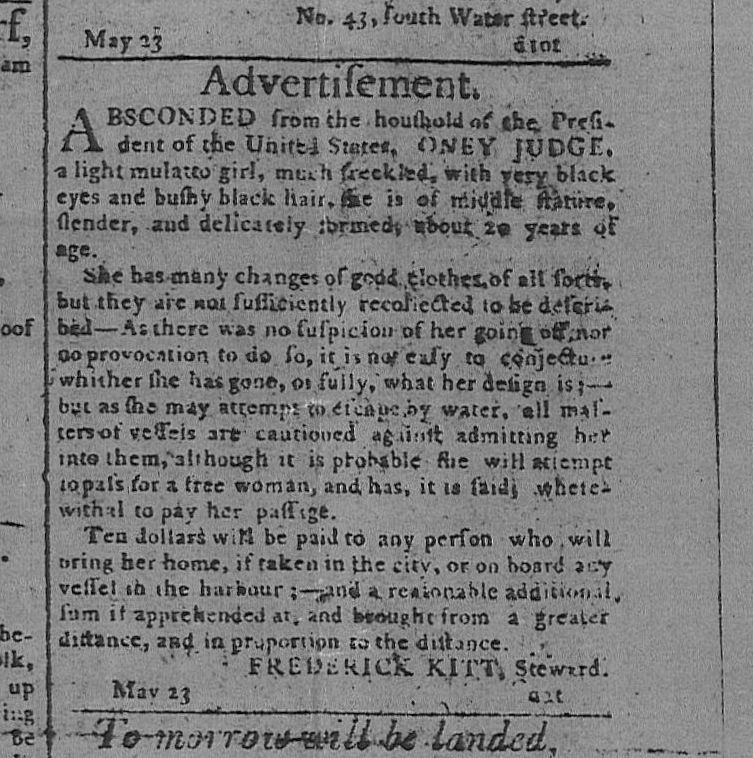
Runaway advertisement for Ona Judge, enslaved servant in Washington's presidential household

His growing disillusionment with the institution was spurred by the principles of the Revolution and revolutionary friends such as Lafayette and Hamilton. Most historians agree the Revolution was central to the evolution of Washington's attitudes; Kenneth Morgan writes that after 1783, "[Washington] began to express inner tensions about the problem of slavery more frequently, though always in private". As president, he remained publicly silent on the topic, believing it was a nationally divisive issue that could undermine the union. He gave moral support to a plan proposed by Lafayette to purchase land and free slaves to work on it, but chose not to participate in the experiment. Washington privately expressed support for emancipation to prominent Methodists Thomas Coke and Francis Asbury in 1785 but declined to sign their petition. In personal correspondence the next year, he made clear his desire to see the institution of slavery ended by a gradual legislative process, a view that correlated with the mainstream antislavery literature published in the 1780s. Washington emancipated 123 or 124 slaves, which was highly unusual among the large slave-holding Virginians during the Revolutionary era. However, he remained dependent on slave labor to work his farms.

Based on his private papers and on accounts from his contemporaries, Washington slowly developed a cautious sympathy toward abolitionism that ended with his will freeing his long-time valet Billy Lee, and freeing the rest of his personally owned slaves outright upon Martha's death. On January 1, 1801, one year after George Washington's death, Martha Washington signed an order to free his slaves. Many of them were reluctant to leave; others refused to abandon spouses or children still held as dower slaves by the Custis estate. Following Washington's instructions in his will, funds were used to feed and clothe the young, aged, and infirm slaves until the early 1830s.

=== Religious and spiritual views ===
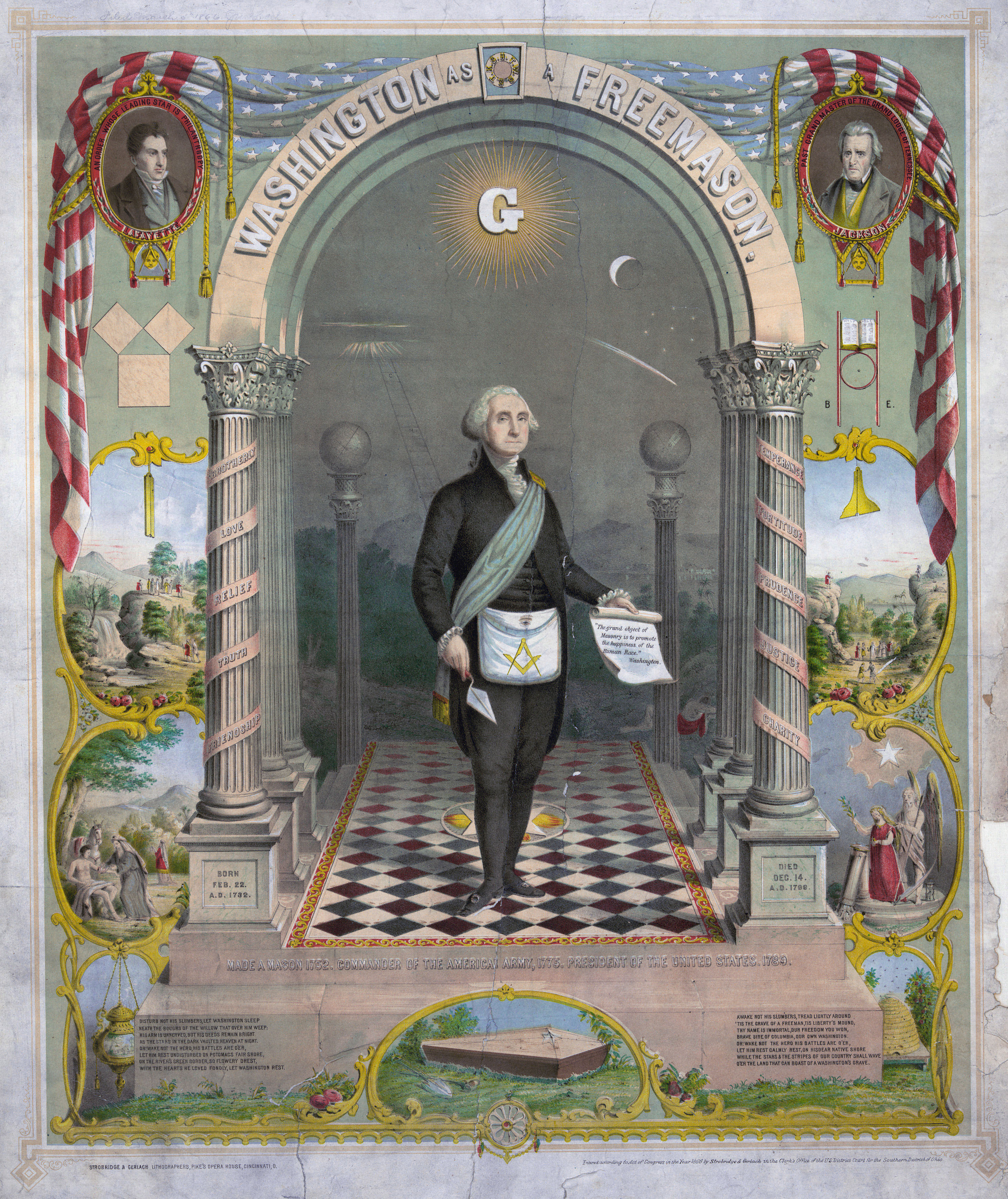
Washington as a Freemason

Washington was baptized as an infant in April 1732 and was a devoted Anglican. He served for more than 20 years as a vestryman and churchwarden at the Fairfax and Truro parishes in Virginia. He privately prayed and read the Bible daily, and publicly encouraged prayer. He may have taken communion regularly prior to the Revolution, but he did not do so afterwards.

Washington referred to God in American Enlightenment terms, including Providence, the Almighty, and the Divine Author. He believed in a divine power who watched over battlefields, influenced the outcome of war, protected his life, and was involved in American politics and specifically in the creation of the United States. Chernow has argued that Washington avoided evangelistic Christianity, hellfire-and-brimstone speech, and anything inclined to "flaunt his religiosity", saying that he "never used his religion as a device for partisan purposes or in official undertakings". At the same time, Washington frequently quoted from or paraphrased the Bible, and often referred to the Anglican Book of Common Prayer.

While president, Washington acknowledged major religious sects, gave speeches on religious toleration, and opposed state religion. He adopted the ideas, values, and modes of thinking of the Enlightenment, but he harbored no contempt for organized Christianity and its clergy. In 1793, speaking to members of the New Church in Baltimore, Washington said, "We have abundant reason to rejoice that in this Land the light of truth and reason has triumphed over the power of bigotry and superstition."

Freemasonry was a widely accepted institution in the late 18th century, known for advocating moral teachings. American Masonic lodges did not share the anti-clerical views of the controversial European lodges. A Masonic lodge was established in Fredericksburg, Virginia, in September 1752, and Washington was initiated two months later at the age of 20 as one of its first Entered Apprentices. Within a year, he progressed through its ranks to become a Master Mason. In 1777, he was recommended for the office of Grand Master of the newly established Grand Lodge of Virginia; sources differ as to whether he declined or was never asked, but he did not assume the role. He served as the charter Master of Alexandria Masonic lodge No. 22 in 1788–1789.

== Personal life ==
Washington's 1751 bout with smallpox may have rendered him sterile, though Chernow notes that it is possible Martha "sustained injury during the birth of Patsy, her final child, making additional births impossible". The couple lamented not having any children together. The two raised Martha's children John Parke Custis (Jacky) and Martha Parke Custis (Patsy), and later Jacky's two youngest children Eleanor Parke Custis (Nelly) and George Washington Parke Custis (Washy), and supported numerous nieces and nephews.

Washington was somewhat reserved in personality, although he was known for having a strong presence. He made speeches and announcements when required, but he was not a noted orator nor debater. He drank alcohol in moderation but was morally opposed to excessive drinking, smoking tobacco, gambling, and profanity. He was taller than most of his contemporaries; accounts of his height vary from 6 ft (1.83 m) to 6 ft 3.5 in (1.92 m). He was known for his strength. He had grey-blue eyes and long reddish-brown hair. He did not wear a powdered wig; instead he wore his hair curled, powdered, and tied in a queue in the fashion of the day.

Washington suffered from severe tooth decay and ultimately lost all of his teeth except one. He had several sets of false teeth during his presidency. Contrary to common lore, these were not made of wood, but of metal, ivory, bone, animal teeth, and human teeth possibly obtained from slaves. His dental problems left him in constant pain, which he treated with laudanum. He also experienced a painful growth in his thigh early in his first presidential term, followed by a life-threatening bout of pneumonia in 1790 from which he never fully recovered. Washington was a talented equestrian. Jefferson described him as "the best horseman of his age". He collected thoroughbreds at Mount Vernon; his two favorite horses were Blueskin and Nelson.

== Legacy ==
Mount Rushmore National Memorial

Washington is one of the most influential figures in American history. Virginia's Governor Henry Lee III eulogized him as "first in war, first in peace, and first in the hearts of his countrymen". Polls have consistently placed Washington among the highest-ranked of presidents.

Washington became an international symbol for liberation and nationalism as the leader of the first successful revolution against a colonial empire. In 1879, Congress proclaimed Washington's Birthday to be a federal holiday. In 1976, he was posthumously appointed General of the Armies of the United States during the American Bicentennial. President Gerald Ford stated that Washington would "rank first among all officers of the Army, past and present". (Note: In Portraits & Biographical Sketches of the United States Army's Senior Officer, William Gardner Bell states that Washington was recalled to military service from his retirement in 1798, and "Congress passed legislation that would have made him General of the Armies of the United States, but his services were not required in the field, and the appointment was not made until the Bicentennial in 1976 when it was bestowed posthumously as a commemorative honor.") On March 13, 1978, Washington was officially promoted by the Army.

In 1809, Mason Locke Weems wrote a hagiographic biography to honor Washington. Chernow maintains that Weems attempted to humanize Washington, inspire "patriotism and morality", and foster "enduring myths", such as that of Washington's refusal to lie about damaging his father's cherry tree. Weems' accounts have never been proven or disproven.

In the 21st century, Washington's reputation has been critically scrutinized. The historian John Ferling maintains that Washington remains the only founder and president ever to be referred to as "godlike", and points out that his character has been the most scrutinized by historians. The historian David Hackett Fischer defined Washington's character as "integrity, self-discipline, courage, absolute honesty, resolve, and decision, but also forbearance, decency, and respect for others".

Washington's legacy with Native Americans is mixed. Chernow describes Washington as always trying to be even-handed in dealing with Indigenous peoples, hoping they would abandon their itinerant hunting life and adapt to fixed agricultural communities in the manner of White settlers. He also maintains that Washington never advocated outright confiscation of tribal land or the forcible removal of tribes. By contrast, Colin G. Calloway wrote that "Washington had a lifelong obsession with getting Indian land, either for himself or for his nation, and initiated policies and campaigns that had devastating effects in Indian country." He stated:

The growth of the nation demanded the dispossession of Indian people... But if Indians refused and resisted, as they often did, he felt he had no choice but to "extirpate" them and that the expeditions he sent to destroy Indian towns were therefore entirely justified.

Along with other Founding Fathers, Washington has been criticized for holding enslaved people. Though he expressed the desire to see the abolition of slavery through legislation, he did not initiate or support any initiatives for bringing about its end. This has led to calls to remove his name from public buildings and his statue from public spaces.

Washington's presidential library is housed at Mount Vernon, which is now a National Historic Landmark. His papers are held by the Library of Congress.

=== Namesakes, monuments and commemorations ===
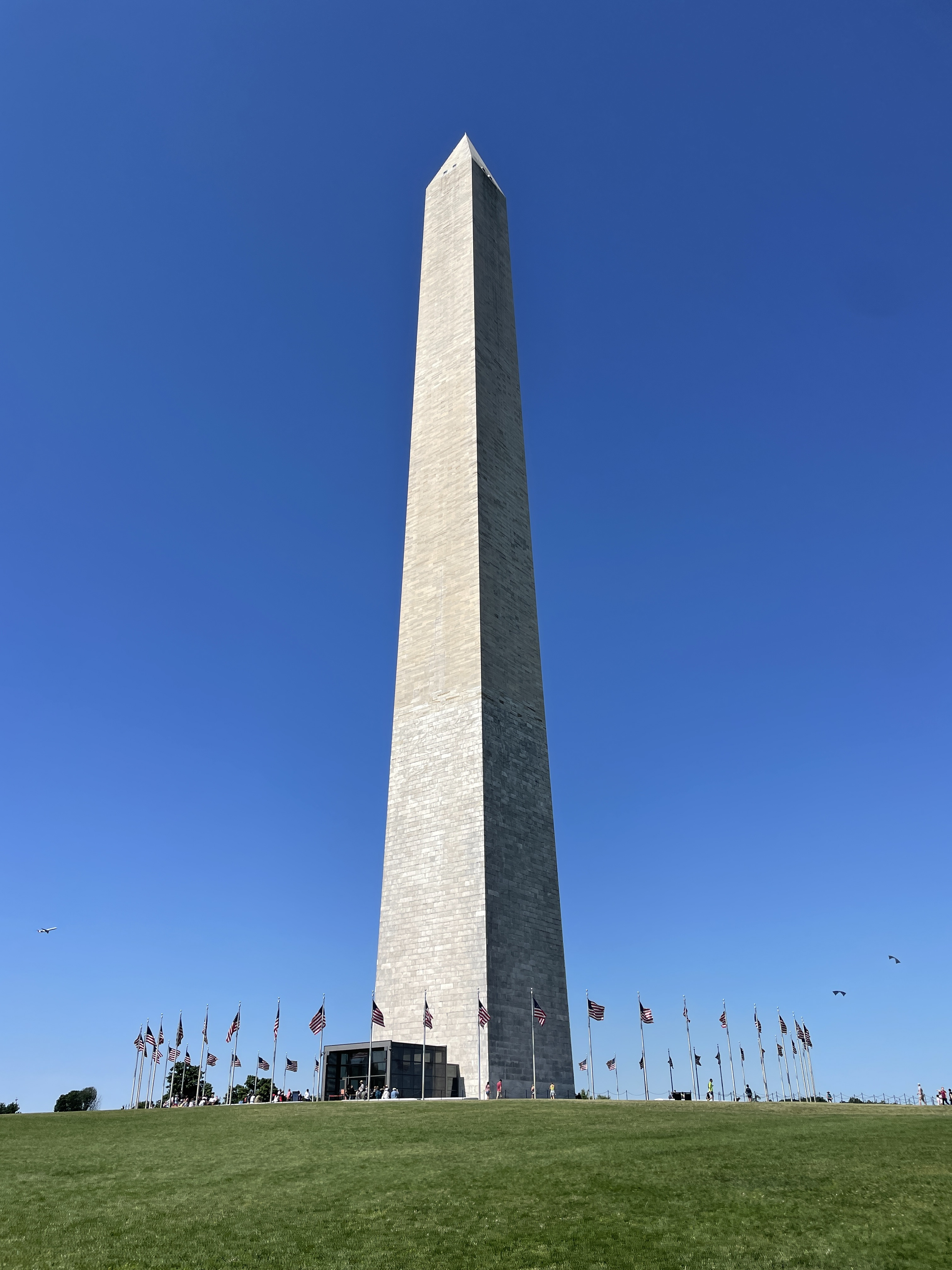
The Washington Monument

Many places and monuments have been named in honor of Washington, including the capital city of Washington, D.C., and the state of Washington. On February 21, 1885, the Washington Monument was dedicated, a 555-foot (169 m) marble obelisk on the National Mall in Washington, D.C. Washington appears as one of four presidents on the Shrine of Democracy, a colossal sculpture by Gutzon Borglum on Mount Rushmore in South Dakota. The George Washington Bridge, opened in 1931, connects New York City to New Jersey. A number of secondary schools and universities are named in honor of Washington, including George Washington University and Washington University in St. Louis.

He appears on contemporary United States currency, including the one-dollar bill, a presidential one-dollar coin and the quarter-dollar coin (the Washington quarter). Washington was pictured on the nation's first postage stamp in 1847, and has since appeared on more United States postage stamps than anyone else. Young Washington is a 2026 American drama film from Angel Studios based on the early life of Washington between 1753 and 1755, featuring Mary-Louise Parker and Kelsey Grammer.

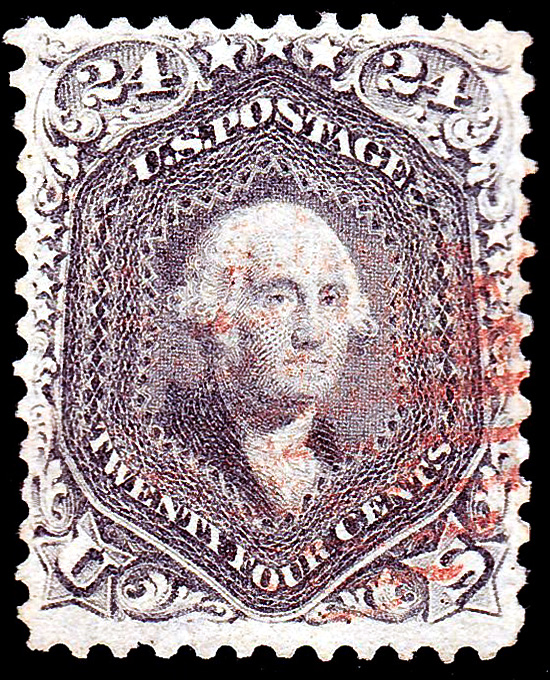
Washington issue of 1862

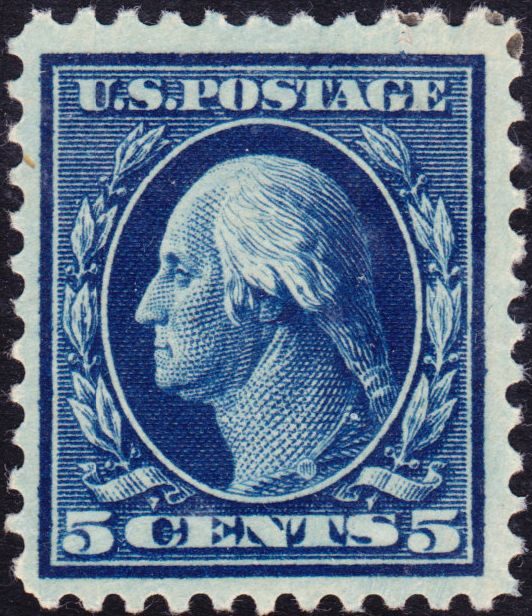
Washington–Franklin issue of 1917

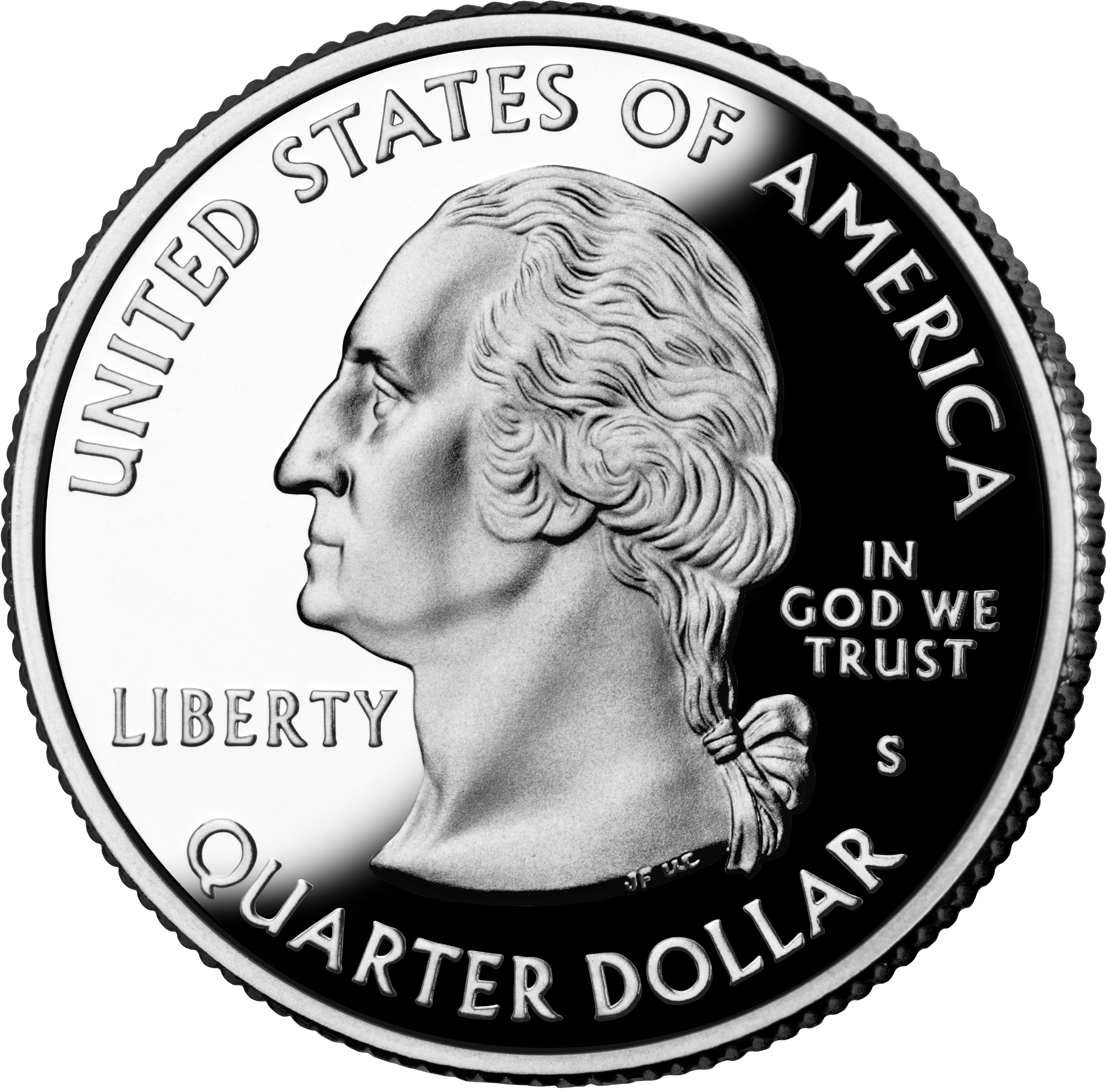
Washington quarter dollar

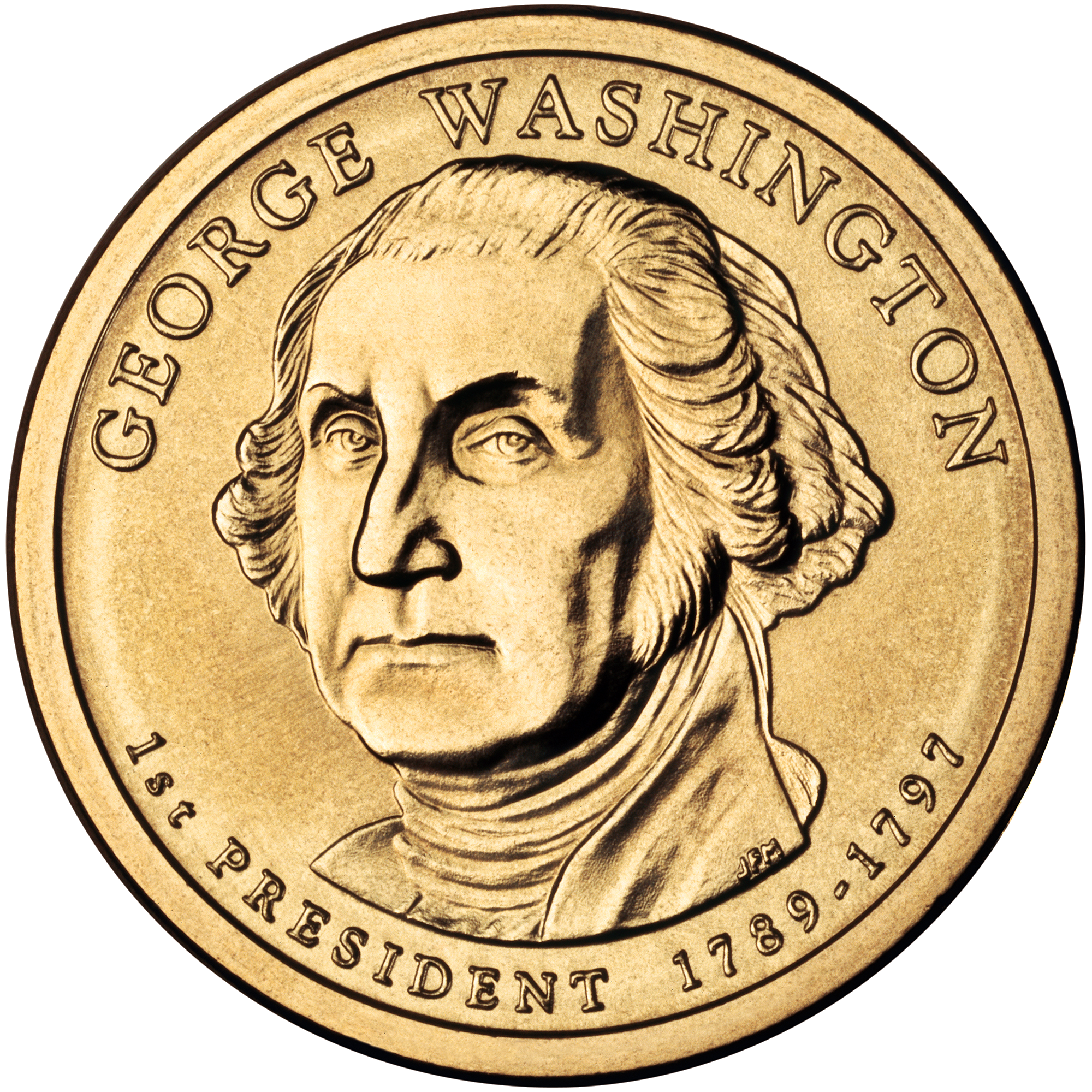
Washington Presidential one-dollar coin

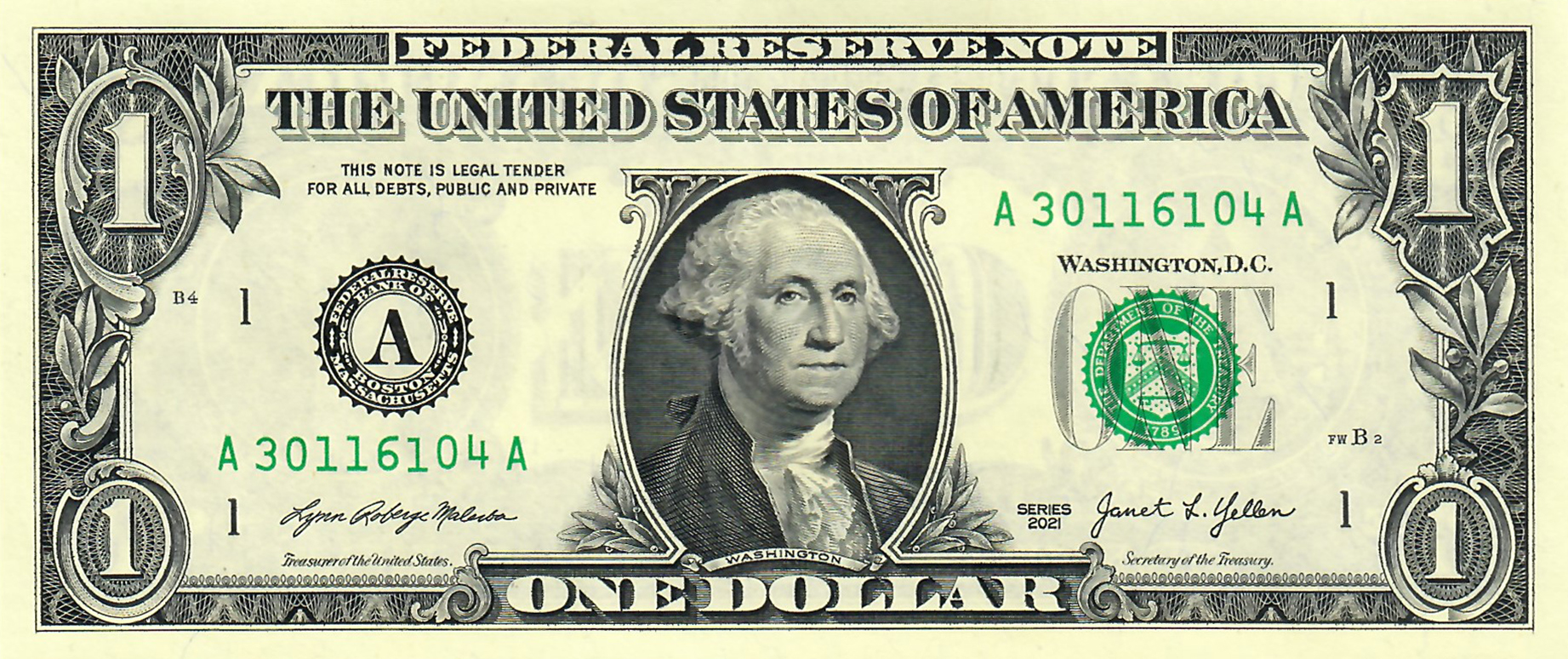
Washington on the 2021 dollar bill

== See also ==
- Outline of George Washington

== Sources ==
=== Books ===
- Akers, Charles W. (2002). "John Adams". In Graff, Henry (ed.). The Presidents: A Reference History (3rd ed.). Scribner. pp. 23–38. ISBN 9780684312262.
- Alden, John R. (1996). George Washington: A Biography. Louisiana State University Press. ISBN 9780807121269.
- Anderson, Fred (2007). Crucible of War: The Seven Years' War and the Fate of Empire in British North America, 1754–1766. Alfred A. Knopf. ISBN 9780307425393.
- Avlon, John (2017). Washington's Farewell: The Founding Father's Warning to Future Generations. Simon & Schuster. ISBN 9781476746463.
- Banner, Stuart (2024). "Establishing the Court". The Most Powerful Court in the World: A History of the Supreme Court of the United States (online ed.). Oxford University Press. pp. 6–36. doi:10.1093/oso/9780197780350.003.0002. ISBN 9780197780350.
- Banning, Lance (1974). Woodward, C. Vann (ed.). Responses of the Presidents to Charges of Misconduct. Delacorte Press. ISBN 9780440059233.
- Bartoloni-Tuazon, Kathleen (2014). For Fear of an Elective King: George Washington and the Presidential Title Controversy of 1789. Cornell University Press. ISBN 9780801452987.
- Bell, William Gardner (1992) [1983]. Commanding Generals and Chiefs of Staff, 1775–2005: Portraits & Biographical Sketches of the United States Army's Senior Officer. Center of Military History, United States Army. ISBN 9780160359125.
- Benn, Carl (1993). Historic Fort York, 1793–1993. Dundurn. ISBN 9780920474792.
- Bodle, Wayne (2004). The Valley Forge Winter: Civilians and Soldiers in War. Pennsylvania State University Press. ISBN 9780271025261.
- Boorstin, Daniel J. (2010). The Americans: The National Experience. Vintage Books. ISBN 9780307756473.
- Bordewich, Fergus M. (2016). The First Congress. Simon & Schuster. ISBN 9781451691931.
- Browne, Stephen Howard (2016). The Ides of War: George Washington and the Newburgh Crisis. University of South Carolina Press. ISBN 9781611176599.
- Calloway, Colin G. (2018). The Indian World of George Washington: The First President, the First Americans, and the Birth of the Nation. Oxford University Press. ISBN 9780190652166.
- Carlson, Brady (2016). Dead Presidents: An American Adventure into the Strange Deaths and Surprising Afterlives of Our Nation's Leaders. W.W. Norton & Company. ISBN 9780393243949.
- Carp, E. Wayne (2017). To Starve the Army at Pleasure: Continental Army Administration and American Political Culture, 1775–1783. University of North Carolina Press. ISBN 9781469639444.
- Chernow, Ron (2005). Alexander Hamilton. Penguin Press. ISBN 9781101200858.
- —— (2010). Washington: A Life. Penguin Press. ISBN 9781594202667.
- Chervinsky, Lindsay (2020). The Cabinet: George Washington and the Creation of an American Institution. Belknap Press. ISBN 9780674986480.
- Coe, Alexis (2020). You Never Forget Your First: A Biography of George Washington. Viking Press. ISBN 9780735224100.
- Cogliano, Francis (2024). A Revolutionary Friendship: Washington, Jefferson, and the American Republic. Harvard University Press. ISBN 9780674296596.
- Cooke, Jacob E. (2002). "George Washington". In Graff, Henry (ed.). The Presidents: A Reference History (3rd ed.). Scribner. pp. 1–21. ISBN 9780684312262.
- Costello, Matthew (2021). The Property of the Nation: George Washington's Tomb, Mount Vernon, and the Memory of the First President. University Press of Kansas. ISBN 9780700633364.
- Cresswell, Julia, ed. (2010). Oxford Dictionary of Word Origins. Oxford University Press. ISBN 9780199547937.
- Cunliffe, Marcus (1958). George Washington: Man and Monument. Little, Brown. ISBN 9780316164344.
- Dalzell, Robert F. Jr.; Dalzell, Lee Baldwin (1998). George Washington's Mount Vernon: At Home in Revolutionary America. Oxford University Press. ISBN 9780195121148.
- Elkins, Stanley M.; McKitrick, Eric (1995) [1993]. The Age of Federalism. Oxford University Press. ISBN 9780195093810.
- Ellis, Joseph J. (2004). His Excellency: George Washington. Alfred A. Knopf. ISBN 9781400040315.
- Ellis, Richard J. (1999). Founding the American Presidency. Rowman & Littlefield. ISBN 9780847694990.
- Ferling, John E. (2002). Setting the World Ablaze: Washington, Adams, Jefferson, and the American Revolution. Oxford University Press. ISBN 9780195134094.
- —— (2007). Almost a Miracle: The American Victory in the War of Independence. Oxford University Press. ISBN 9780199758470.
- —— (2009). The Ascent of George Washington: The Hidden Political Genius of an American Icon. Bloomsbury Press. ISBN 9781608191826.
- —— (2010) [1988]. The First of Men: A Life of George Washington. Oxford University Press. ISBN 9780199752751.
- Fischer, David Hackett (2004). Washington's Crossing. Oxford University Press. ISBN 9780195170344.
- Fishman, Ethan M.; Pederson, William D.; Rozell, Mark J. (2001). George Washington: Foundation of Presidential Leadership and Character. Praeger. ISBN 9780275968687.
- Fitzpatrick, John C. (1936). "Washington, George". In Malone, Dumas (ed.). Dictionary of American Biography. Vol. 19. Scribner. pp. 509–527.
- Fleming, Thomas (2007). The Perils of Peace: America's Struggle for Survival After Yorktown. Smithsonian. ISBN 9780061139109.
- Flexner, James Thomas (1965). George Washington: The Forge of Experience (1732–1775). Little, Brown. ISBN 9780316285971.
- —— (1972). George Washington: Anguish and Farewell (1793–1799). Little, Brown. ISBN 9780316286022.
- —— (1974). Washington: The Indispensable Man. Little, Brown. ISBN 9780316286053.
- Frazer, Gregg L. (2012). The Religious Beliefs of America's Founders: Reason, Revelation, and Revolution. University Press of Kansas. ISBN 9780700618453.
- Genovese, Michael; Landry, Alysa (2021). US Presidents and the Destruction of the Native American Nations. Palgrave Macmillan. ISBN 9783030835736.
- Glenn, Justin (2014). The Washingtons: A Family History. Vol. 1. Savas Publishing. ISBN 9781940669267.
- Glover, Lorri (2014). Founders as Fathers: The Private Lives and Politics of the American Revolutionaries. Yale University Press. ISBN 9780300178609.
- Gregg, Gary L.; Spalding, Matthew, eds. (1999). Patriot Sage: George Washington and the American Political Tradition. ISI Books. ISBN 9781882926381.
- Grizzard, Frank E. Jr. (2002). George Washington: A Biographical Companion. ABC-CLIO. ISBN 9781576070826.
- —— (2005). George!: A Guide to All Things Washington. Mariner. ISBN 9780976823889.
- Harrison, Adrienne (2015). A Powerful Mind: The Self-Education of George Washington. Potomac Books. ISBN 9781612347257.
- Hayes, Kevin J. (2017). George Washington, A Life in Books. Oxford University Press. ISBN 9780190456672.
- Henriques, Peter R. (2006). Realistic Visionary: A Portrait of George Washington. University Press of Virginia. ISBN 9780813927411.
- —— (2020). First and Always: A New Portrait of George Washington. University of Virginia Press. ISBN 9780813944807.
- Herrera, Ricardo (2022). Feeding Washington's Army: Surviving the Valley Forge Winter of 1778. University of North Carolina Press. ISBN 9781469667324.
- Hirschfeld, Fritz (1997). George Washington and Slavery: A Documentary Portrayal. University of Missouri Press. ISBN 9780826211354.
- Holmes, David (2006). The Faiths of the Founding Fathers. Oxford University Press. ISBN 9780199740963.
- Isaacson, Walter (2003). Benjamin Franklin: An American Life. Simon & Schuster. ISBN 9780743260848.
- Ketchum, Richard M. (1999) [1973]. The Winter Soldiers: The Battles for Trenton and Princeton. Henry Holt. ISBN 9780805060980.
- Kohn, Richard H. (1975). Eagle and Sword: The Federalists and the Creation of the Military Establishment in America, 1783–1802. Free Press. ISBN 9780029175514.
- Lancaster, Bruce; Plumb, John H. (1985). The American Revolution. American Heritage Press. ISBN 9780828102810.
- Larson, Edward (2014). The Return of George Washington: Uniting the States, 1783–1789. HarperCollins. ISBN 9780062248695.
- Lengel, Edward G. (2005). General George Washington: A Military Life. Random House. ISBN 9781400060818.
- —— (2015). First Entrepreneur: How George Washington Built His—and the Nation's—Prosperity. Da Capo Press. ISBN 9780306823473.
- Lender, Mark; Stone, Gary (2016). Fatal Sunday: George Washington, the Monmouth Campaign, and the Politics of Battle. University of Oklahoma Press. ISBN 9780806155135.
- Levy, Philip (2013). Where the Cherry Tree Grew: The Story of Ferry Farm, George Washington's Boyhood Home. Macmillan. ISBN 9781250023148.
- Mann, Barbara (2008). George Washington's War on Native America. University of Nebraska Press. ISBN 9780803216358.
- McCullough, David (2005). 1776. Simon & Schuster. ISBN 9780743226714.
- Middlekauff, Robert (2015). Washington's Revolution: The Making of America's First Leader. Knopf Doubleday Publishing Group. ISBN 9781101874240.
- Misencik, Paul (2014). George Washington and the Half-King Chief Tanacharison. McFarland. ISBN 9781476615400.
- Morrison, Jeffery H. (2009). The Political Philosophy of George Washington. Johns Hopkins University Press. ISBN 9780801891090.
- Murray, Robert K.; Blessing, Tim H. (1994). Greatness in the White House: Rating the Presidents, from Washington Through Ronald Reagan (2nd, updated ed.). Pennsylvania State University Press. ISBN 9780271010892.
- Nagy, John (2016). George Washington's Secret Spy War: The Making of America's First Spymaster. St. Martin's Press. ISBN 9781250096821.
- Novak, Michael; Novak, Jana (2007). Washington's God: Religion, Liberty, and the Father of Our Country. Basic Books. ISBN 9780465051267.
- Nowlan, Robert A. (2014). The American Presidents, Washington to Tyler: What They Did, What They Said, What Was Said About Them, with Full Source Notes. McFarland. ISBN 9781476601182.
- Painter, Nell Irvin (2006). Creating Black Americans: African-American History and Its Meanings, 1619 to the Present. Oxford University Press. ISBN 9780195137552.
- Palmer, Dave Richard (2006). George Washington and Benedict Arnold: A Tale of Two Patriots. Regnery Publishing. ISBN 9781596981645.
- Patterson, Benton (2004). Washington and Cornwallis: The Battle for America, 1775–1783. Globe Pequot. ISBN 9781461734703.
- Pearson, Michael (2009). Those Damned Rebels: The American Revolution as Seen Through British Eyes. Hachette Books. ISBN 9780786749782.
- Philbrick, Nathaniel (2016). Valiant Ambition: George Washington, Benedict Arnold, and the Fate of the American Revolution. Viking Press. ISBN 9780143110194.
- Puls, Mark (2008). Henry Knox: Visionary General of the American Revolution. St. Martin's Press. ISBN 9780230611429.
- Ragsdale, Bruce (2021). Washington at the Plow: The Founding Father and the Question of Slavery. Harvard University Press. ISBN 9780674246386.
- Randall, Willard Sterne (1997). George Washington: A Life. Henry Holt. ISBN 9780805027792.
- Rasmussen, William M. S.; Tilton, Robert S. (1999). George Washington: The Man Behind the Myths. University Press of Virginia. ISBN 9780813919003.
- Rhodehamel, John (2017). George Washington: The Wonder of the Age. Yale University Press. ISBN 9780300219975.
- Rockland, Michael (2020). The George Washington Bridge: Poetry in Steel. Rutgers University Press. ISBN 9780813594644.
- Rose, Alexander (2006). Washington's Spies: The Story of America's First Spy Ring. Random House Publishing Group. ISBN 9780553804218.
- Spalding, Matthew; Garrity, Patrick J. (1996). A Sacred Union of Citizens: George Washington's Farewell Address and the American Character. Rowman & Littlefield. ISBN 9780847682621.
- Stavish, Mark (2007). Freemasonry: Rituals, Symbols & History of the Secret Society. Llewellyn Publications. ISBN 9780738711485.
- Stewart, David (2021). George Washington: The Political Rise of America's Founding Father. Dutton. ISBN 9780451488985.
- Subak, Susan (2018). The Five-Ton Life. Our Sustainable Future. University of Nebraska Press. ISBN 9780803296886.
- Tabbert, Mark (2022). A Deserving Brother: George Washington and Freemasonry. University of Virginia Press. ISBN 9780813947228.
- Taylor, Alan (2016). American Revolutions: A Continental History, 1750–1804. W.W. Norton & Company. ISBN 9780393354768.
- Tschachler, Heinz (2020). George Washington on Coins and Currency. McFarland. ISBN 9781476681108.
- Thompson, Mary (2008). "In The Hands of a Good Providence": Religion in the Life of George Washington. University of Virginia Press. ISBN 9780813927633.
- Twohig, Dorothy (2001). "'That Species of Property': Washington's Role in the Controversy over Slavery". In Higginbotham, Don (ed.). George Washington Reconsidered. University Press of Virginia. pp. 114–138. ISBN 9780813920054. Archived from the original on November 19, 2019.
- Unger, Harlow Giles (2013). "Mr. President": George Washington and the Making of the Nation's Highest Office. Da Capo Press. ISBN 9780306822414.
- Vicchio, Stephen (2019). George Washington's Religion. Wipf & Stock. ISBN 9781532688393.
- Weems, Mason Locke (1918). A History of the Life and Death, Virtues and Exploits of General George Washington, with Curious Anecdotes, Equally Honourable to Himself and Exemplary to His Young Countrymen. J.B. Lippincott.
- West, Christopher (2014). A History of America in Thirty-Six Postage Stamps. Picador. ISBN 9781250043689.
- Wiencek, Henry (2003). An Imperfect God: George Washington, His Slaves, and the Creation of America. Farrar, Straus and Giroux. ISBN 9780374175269.
- Willcox, William B.; Arnstein, Walter L. (1988). The Age of Aristocracy 1688 to 1830 (Fifth ed.). D.C. Heath and Company. ISBN 9780669134230.
- Wood, Gordon S. (1992). The Radicalism of the American Revolution. Alfred A. Knopf. ISBN 9780679404934.
- —— (2001). Higginbotham, Don (ed.). George Washington Reconsidered. University Press of Virginia. ISBN 9780813920054.
- Wright, Robert (1983). The Continental Army. U.S. Army Center of Military History. ISBN 9780160019319.
- Wulf, Andrea (2011). Founding Gardeners: The Revolutionary Generation, Nature, and the Shaping of the American Nation. Alfred A. Knopf. ISBN 9780307390684.

=== Journals ===
- Cheatham, Michael L. (2008). "The Death of George Washington: An End to the Controversy?". The American Surgeon. 74 (8): 770–774. doi:10.1177/000313480807400821. PMID 18705585.
- Estes, Todd (2000). "Shaping the Politics of Public Opinion: Federalists and the Jay Treaty Debate". Journal of the Early Republic. 20 (3): 393–422. doi:10.2307/3125063. JSTOR 3125063.
- —— (2001). "The Art of Presidential Leadership: George Washington and the Jay Treaty". The Virginia Magazine of History and Biography. 109 (2): 127–158. JSTOR 4249911.
- Furstenberg, François (2011). "Atlantic Slavery, Atlantic Freedom: George Washington, Slavery, and Transatlantic Abolitionist Networks". The William and Mary Quarterly. 68 (2): 247–286. doi:10.5309/willmaryquar.68.2.0247. JSTOR 10.5309/willmaryquar.68.2.0247.
- Gardner, Andrew (2013). "How Did Washington Make His Millions?". Colonial Williamsburg Journal. 35 (1): 60–66. Archived from the original on February 28, 2024.
- Heydt, Bruce (2005). "'Vexatious Evils': George Washington and the Conway Cabal". American History. 40 (5): 50–73.
- Kleber, Brooks E. (June 1978). "Washington is Now No. 1: The Story Behind a Promotion". Army. pp. 14–15.
- Mackowiak, Philip (2021). "George Washington's Recurrent Health Problems and Fatal Infection Re-examined". Clinical Infectious Diseases. 72 (10): 1850–1853. doi:10.1093/cid/ciaa1324. PMID 32887987.
- Morens, David M. (1999). "Death of a President". New England Journal of Medicine. 341 (24): 1845–1849. doi:10.1056/NEJM199912093412413. PMID 10588974.
- Morgan, Kenneth (2000). "George Washington and the Problem of Slavery". Journal of American Studies. 34 (2): 279–301. doi:10.1017/S0021875899006398. JSTOR 27556810.
- Morgan, Philip D. (2005). "'To Get Quit of Negroes': George Washington and Slavery". Journal of American Studies. 39 (3): 403–429. doi:10.1017/S0021875805000599. JSTOR 27557691.
- Newton, R.S.; Freeman, Z.; Bickley, G., eds. (1858). "Heroic Treatment—Illness and Death of George Washington". The Eclectic Medical Journal. 1717: 273–274.
- Peabody, Bruce G. (2001). "George Washington, Presidential Term Limits, and the Problem of Reluctant Political Leadership". Presidential Studies Quarterly. 31 (3): 439–453. doi:10.1111/j.0360-4918.2001.00180.x. JSTOR 27552322.

Military offices
| New office | Commander in Chief of the Continental Army; 1775–1783 | Succeeded by Henry Knox as Senior Officer |
| Preceded by James Wilkinson | Senior Officer of the United States Army; 1798–1799 | Succeeded by Alexander Hamilton |
Political offices
| Preceded by Hugh West | Member of the Virginia House of Burgesses; 1758–1775 | Office abolished |
| New office | Delegate from Virginia to the Continental Congress; 1774–1775 | Succeeded by Thomas Jefferson |
| New office | President of the United States; 1789–1797 | Succeeded by John Adams |
Academic offices
| Preceded by Richard Terrick | Chancellor of the College of William & Mary; 1788–1799 | Succeeded by John Tyler |
