= Gwirtzman =

Gwirtzman, Gewirtzman, Gevirtzman, Gwirtsman, etc. (Yiddish: געווירצמאן) is a surname of Ashkenazi Jewish origin, with gwirtz/gvirts meaning "spice". Notable people with the surname include:

- Amir Gwirtzman (Born August 28, 1965), Israeli musician, composer, and producer
- Milton Gwirtzman (March 17, 1933 – July 23, 2011), American Iawyer

== See also ==
- Gevirtz, Gewertz, Gewirtz, Gewirth
- Gvirtz
