= Sufrin =

Sufrin is a surname. Notable people with the surname include:

- Carolyn Sufrin, American medical anthropologist and obstetrician-gynecologist
- Eileen Tallman Sufrin (1913–1999), Canadian author and labour activist
- Gerald Sufrin, American urologist
- Solomon Sufrin (1881–1931), American politician
