= Reproductive health care for incarcerated women in the United States =

In the United States, prisons are obligated to provide health care to prisoners. Such health care is sometimes called correctional medicine. In women's prisons, correctional medicine includes attention to reproductive health.

The number of women incarcerated in the United States has increased greatly over the last few decades, and at a faster rate than the number of incarcerated men. Many of the same factors that increase women's likelihood of incarceration also put them at a higher risk for contracting HIV/AIDS and other sexually transmitted infections, and for having high-risk pregnancies. The majority of incarcerated women are economically disadvantaged and poorly educated, and have not had adequate access to preventive healthcare prior to their imprisonment, such as Pap tests, STI screening, and pregnancy counseling.

== Legal standards for health care availability ==
=== Historical precedence ===
==== Estelle v. Gamble (1976) ====
Estelle v. Gamble obligates prisons to provide for the serious medical needs of their inmates. However, it also requires that an incarcerated person must demonstrate that they had a serious medical need, and that they didn't receive adequate medical care because officials showed "deliberate indifference." Due to the difficulty inherent in proving that a prison official knew about a medical condition, yet failed to respond to it, this standard makes it difficult to hold correctional facilities accountable for their mistakes.

==== Todaro v. Ward (1977) ====
Todaro v. Ward argued that women within a New York prison did not have adequate, constitutional access to healthcare. Since Todaro v. Ward was the first major court case that called into question incarcerated women's actual access to health care, it spurred organizations such as the American Medical Association, American Correctional Association, and the American Public Health Association to start creating standards for health care within prisons.

==== Brown v. Beck (1980) ====
With this ruling, the court determined that the medical care provided to prisoners must only be "reasonable," not necessarily "perfect, the best obtainable, or even very good."

=== Relevant federal legislation and standards ===
Currently, no national agency monitors the treatment of prisoners, although a few governmental and non-governmental agencies do provide monitoring standards that facilities may use if they wish to become accredited (about thirty percent of prisons are accredited), and some federal legislation has been passed regarding correctional health care.

==== Federal Prisoner Co-Payment Act (1999) ====
This legislation required that incarcerated individuals pay for some of their health care bill while in prison.

==== Prison Litigation Reform Act (1996) ====
The Prison Litigation Reform Act made it much more difficult for prisoners to file class action and individual lawsuits against a prison. The Prison Litigation Reform Act (PRLA) requires that prisoners exhaust a facility's own administrative resources and solutions before attempting to file a lawsuit. This can be detrimental because prisoners' health problems are often time-sensitive. PRLA also includes a cap on attorney fees, which has made fewer attorneys willing to represent prisoners. Although PRLA applies to all lawsuits filed by incarcerated people, it is particularly relevant for women's health because most lawsuits filed by incarcerated women concern substandard health care.

Policies: Act's and Bill's

Healthy Start Act

According to Patrice Gaines, from NBC News article titled One state is trying to make pregnancy in prison slightly more bearable there is change happening right now. One of the new programs introduced into the prison system in Minnesota is the Healthy Start Act. This Act allows pregnant mothers to continue to serve their current sentences in an alternative community. This kind of alternative community would be a halfway house for example or a rehab treatment center. The Healthy Start Act will give mothers the opportunity to form bonds with their newborns. Previously women gave birth, and their children were taken away automatically. By allowing the mothers to form a connection right away after birth they will help the child with their development. Minnesota has also banned the use of shackles on pregnant woman during birth. Other states have also followed like New York and Georgia. Another improvement was also the addition of conditional release. This Minnesota Act was very significant in history. The Act was led by State Representative Jamie Becker-Finn and was also supported by all women. It was considered to be an all-women bill. This legislation has been in the making for about 10 years now. Over the course of this time, the Minnesota Prison Doula Project would interview women to find out what kind of care they needed in the prisons. This information was gathered and used to create this Act.

The House Bill 608

After years of unfair treatment another bill was enacted and is addressing discrepancies in woman's healthcare in prisons. The House Bill 608 signed in North Carolina focuses on women's healthcare in prisons and improving overall conditions. According to the Port City Daily Staff, the new Bill will protect pregnant prisoners specifically. These women will be guaranteed proper medical care at no cost and would be allowing for mother-child bonding as well right after birth. This bill also includes banning cavity searches of pregnant women unless there is a threat or harm presented. Another addition to this bill is that pregnant prisoners are required to be provided with proper nutrition and supplements for the baby. Finally, these women are to be held in prisons that are about 250 miles or less away from their children and families. This also includes mothers and children meeting every other week in person.

The Dignity for Incarcerated Women Act of 2017

The Dignity for Incarcerated Women Act of 2017, Dignity Act, enacted on July 11, 2017 by Senator Cory Booker of New Jersey also focuses on improving healthcare and conditions for incarcerated women in prisons in the United States. According to the American Progress, the officials wanted to improve the overall treatment of women in prison and jails. They hope to provide more help with their children during their incarceration period, helping with reentry into the society and also providing inmates with more health care resources and products. The act also includes a program that would support women in prison providing them with free menstrual products. Many prisons all over the US do not provide feminine products to all inmates. These women have to choose between buying deodorant or a pack of pads during the week. The Dignity Act also focuses on mental health problems that women face in prison as well as focusing on the trauma that these women face in and out of prison. According to the American Psychological Association, about 75% percent of women in prisons and jails suffer from substance abuse issues. About 68% of women incarcerated in the US have experiences sexual abuse and physical abuse. (American Psychological Association) It is also known that women of color are more likely to enter the criminal justice system than white women. Women of color also experience higher levels of abuse than white women. This Dignity Act will mandate that correctional officers be required to complete trauma identification training. This will help those officers understand and actually allow them to help with prisoners with families, children and those who are pregnant.

== Correctional reproductive health care ==
=== Pregnancy and prenatal care ===
As of 2005, about five to ten percent of incarcerated women were pregnant (most upon intake), and about 2,000 incarcerated women give birth every year. Incarcerated women already tend to have more high-risk pregnancies, due to possible complications by drug and alcohol abuse and STIs, histories of victimization and abuse, and poor support networks, so they are particularly in need of quality prenatal care as compared to non-incarcerated women.

Studies have found mixed results when it comes to the effects of incarceration on pregnancy outcomes. Some studies have found that incarceration correlates to lower birth weight, and an increased chance of complications in the pregnancy; others have found the opposite: that incarceration is associated with higher birth weight and a decreased likelihood of premature delivery. However, the latter finding may simply speak to the low level of medical care available to women in poverty in the free world.

A 1996 study conducted by the National Council on Crime and Delinquency (NCCD) on women in California, Connecticut, and Florida state prisons found a lack of adequate prenatal and postnatal medical care, prenatal nutrition, level of methadone maintenance for opiate-dependent pregnant inmates, education regarding childbirth and parenting, and preparation for the mother's separation from her child. Often, inmates report receiving no regular pelvic exams or sonograms, and little to no information about proper prenatal care and nutrition. Prison diets often lack proper nutrition, particularly for the changing and special dietary needs of pregnant women, and many women prisoners report not being allowed to alter their diets during their pregnancy.

Despite the lack or low quality of prenatal care in most institutions, many correctional facilities have made strides to provide adequate care. For example, Washington State has a program called the Birth Attendants Prison Doula project, which provides support to incarcerated pregnant and postpartum women. When asked about her prison's response to pregnancy, Boo, an inmate in an Arizona correctional facility, said:

They're real good people to me... I get taken care of in here very well. They give us three pregnancy bags a day which contain two cartons of milk, two orange juices, and two fruits, and you get three pills three times a day during breakfast, lunch, and dinner.

In general, pregnant inmates are transported to outside medical facilities to give birth, because most correctional facilities are not medically equipped to provide such services. These transports often result in complications due to the risk of injury to both the mother and the child, and due to the additional stress.

The practice of shackling inmates, both in transit to the hospital and during labor, is also common at many facilities. Forty-one states permit the use of restraints during transport to the hospital, and twenty-three states and the federal government permit the use of restraints during labor. These restraints may include belly chains, shackles, handcuffs, or nylon "soft restraints." The use of restraints on women so far into their pregnancy and during labor poses many health risks. Restraints inhibit the movement of a woman, something that aids the progression of the labor and alleviates some of her discomfort. They may also hinder the ability of health care professionals to respond quickly to emergencies during the labor. Organizations such as Amnesty International have pressured correctional facilities to stop the use of shackles on pregnant women, pointing out the fact that most pregnant women are incarcerated for nonviolent offenses and pose no risk (especially during childbirth), so the restraints are unnecessary. Maria Jones, a pregnant inmate, described her experience being shackled during labor:

Because I was shackled to the bed, they couldn't remove the lower part of the bed for the delivery, and they couldn't put my feet in the stirrups. My feet were still shackled together, and I couldn't get my legs apart. The doctor called for the officer, but the officer had gone down the hall. No one else could unlock the shackles, and my baby was coming but I couldn't open my legs.

After Senator Cory Booker's Dignity for Incarcerated Women Act, state legislators began to formally prohibit the practice of shackling incarcerated pregnant women. In 2019, the state of Georgia unanimously voted to outlaw this practice through HB 345 after the bill's author, Pamela Winn, received national attention for sharing her experience being incarcerated and shackled. Since 2019, Alabama has also banned this practice.

=== HIV/AIDS ===
Incarcerated women are 15 times more likely to be infected with HIV than are women who are free, and are also more than twice as likely than incarcerated men to be infected with HIV. For example, in New York, a state which does blind testing, 14.6% of incarcerated women and 7.3% of incarcerated men tested positive for HIV. The 1996 NCCD study found that female African American and Hispanic/Latina inmates were significantly more likely than their White counterparts to report testing positive for HIV. Many of the same social factors that increase the likelihood of incarceration for women, such as poverty, race, gender, and a history of victimization, are also correlated to HIV infection.

A 2000 study by the American Correctional Association found that mandatory HIV testing is conducted upon intake in 23 states, and that a few also provide 6-month follow-up testing. Most prisons test inmates who either ask to be tested, or display symptoms of HIV (this is the policy in 44 out of 51 jurisdictions), and fifteen states also specifically test inmates that are in high-risk groups. Three states, the District of Columbia, and the Federal Bureau of Prisons test inmates upon release. The same American Correctional Association study also found that most prisons provide HIV-positive individuals with medications while they are in the prison, may provide them with a small supply after they are released, and may also direct them towards community resources where they can receive more medication. Treatment of inmates who have tested positive for HIV varies greatly from state to state. For example, in New Jersey, female HIV positive prisoners were shackled to their beds for up to six months after being diagnosed. However, Ohio and New York, among other states, have infirmaries specifically adapted to attend to the needs of inmates with HIV/AIDS, and allow some inmates to reside in a hospital for treatment. In addition to this, New York State's Division of Health Services department does regular evaluations of the state prisons' services for AIDS patients, and also provides space for support groups to meet, and patients to be counseled on their illness.

Women's symptoms and treatment needs for HIV infection are quite different from those of men, but the treatment resources for incarcerated women are often limited. The treatment of HIV requires a specialist, and generally, prison doctors don't have adequate training to treat women effectively. Or, prisons often do not have adequate facilities, staff, or a follow-up treatment system. For example, the 1996 NCCD study also found that within the entire California women's prison system, one of the largest in the nation, there was only one full-time specialist able to provide "gender-specific treatment" to women with HIV. Male prisoners, however, did have access to gender-specific HIV treatment.

=== Abortion ===
Federal courts have established, according to constitutional law, that prisoners retain the right to have an abortion once they are incarcerated. However, state standards regarding abortion for incarcerated women are unclear - actions are often left up to the discretion of prison officials on a case-by-case basis.

Most state abortion policies are written and approved without going through the administrative process which other policies are generally subject to; thus, they are frequently incomplete. In fact, fourteen state DOCs have no official written abortion policies, and others simply will not release or publish their policies. Alaska has a provision which bans abortion funding in its policy on general medical services, but no specific policy guidelines on abortion. Other states may not define the exact type of abortions they pay for. Most states require that women pay for all of the costs of an abortion procedure, including transportation to the clinic (which is often far due to prisons' rural locations, and the urban locations of most abortion clinics), security, and the actual surgery. Minnesota and Wisconsin are the only two states which explicitly mention in their policies that they pay for abortions if a woman has been raped. The policy of the Federal Bureau of Prisons since 1987 has been to pay for abortion only in the cases of rape or life endangerment (although they do pay for transportation to the clinic). Women's experiences and perceptions of their own access to abortion reflect these policies. In a nationwide survey of correctional health care and inmates' access to abortion, 68% of respondents said that women within their prison were allowed to have an abortion if they requested one. However, many respondents also stated that although their prison did allow access to abortion, women receive little to no help with arranging an appointment, paying for the procedure, and getting themselves to the clinic.

=== Contraception ===
Incarcerated women are given access to contraceptives, however, most contraceptives offered are irreversible procedures with a lack of counseling in guiding their decision. According to a 2021 research study, approximately 50% of prisons and 83% of jails allow for residing incarcerated women to receive permanent contraception regardless of whether a written policy was enforced. Ten out of 22 state prisons and all six jails studied offered reversible contraceptives, however, 6 prisons offered permanent contraception and not reversible contraception. It is estimated that approximately 6-10% of women become incarcerated while pregnant and that most of these women realize this once they have already been taken to either jail or prison. Researchers find this to be concerning which leads them to emphasize that institutions should offer emergency contraception for newly incarcerated women. Incarcerated women who are newly arrested can be offered emergency contraception based on eligibility. Reasons for ineligibility include being over 44 years old, inability to speak English, or they cannot consent. Women are also able to decline to enroll for eligibility while some could not be deemed eligible due to the nature of their charges or a research assistant not assisting them within a day of the arrest.

Nine out of 22 prisons and one of 6 jails covered the costs for giving women permanent contraception while 2 prisons had other methods of payment. Some institutions consider the cost to be covered in the fee that is used to cover prison health care. Four jails offered residing female prisoners to cover costs using their insurance, government provided insurance, or by payment of hospital bill to receive permanent contraception.

=== Female Hygiene Products ===
Inadequate access to female menstrual products inhibits the health of incarcerated females. In 2016, New York passed the first law requiring correctional facilities to provide free feminine hygiene products, and in 2018, the FIRST STEP Act, required federal correctional facilities to provide free feminine hygiene products to prisoners. In federal prisons, feminine hygiene products can be purchased at a commissary or a canteen at inflated prices. Some states have enacted legislation requiring or ensuring adequate access to menstrual products in state prisons. As of 2020, 13 states (AL, CA, CO, CT, FL, KY, LA, MD, NY, TN, TX, VA) and Washington, D.C. have enacted legislation requiring free access to such products. However, reports from different States indicate that free feminine hygiene products are less absorbent than industry standard products that can only be purchased in the canteen. In a survey conducted at The Missouri Department of Corrections it was found that even though free sanitary napkins were provided, 80.3 per cent of respondents to the survey reported that they had created tampons themselves because of poor absorption and had reported problems related to increased reproductive and urinary tract infections.

=== Other reproductive health care ===
==== Cancer and general gynecological care ====
According to the U.S. Department of Justice Bureau of Justice Statistics, cancer is one of the leading causes of death for women (both inside and outside prison), and one-quarter of deaths of incarcerated women due to cancer are from breast, cervical, ovarian, and uterine cancer. In particular, women in prison are at a high risk for contracting cervical cancer due to their high rates of substance abuse and diseases such as hepatitis C, HIV, and other STIs. However, reproductive health care reform in prisons generally focuses on pregnancy or HIV.

Incarcerated women have higher rates of STIs and gynecologic infections than non-incarcerated women. In fact, one study estimated that about 9% of incarcerated women tested positive for gonococcus infection, and between 11 and 17% of incarcerated women are infected with chlamydia. However, not every infected woman will be diagnosed and given treatment, because many prisons only test women who request to be tested, or show symptoms.

States often have their own legislation regarding correctional health care, but it doesn't always completely take into consideration the complexities of women's reproductive health. For example, the New York State Department of Corrections and Community Supervision (DOCCS) has issued two main documents which outline their institutional health care policies: the Health Services Policy Manual, and the Women's Health Primary Care Practice Guideline (first published in 2000, and updated in 2008 and 2011). Within these documents, the Patient Bill of Rights includes the right of a patient to respectful care, the right to refuse treatment, and the right to complete information regarding a diagnosis; the Professional Code of Ethics outlines the standards that staff must follow, including having a respect for human dignity, and a professional relationship with the patient. The DOCCS does not monitor how well facilities actually adhere to these standards, and there are no consequences for those who do not. Also, many women are not informed of their patient's rights, so are unaware when standards have been breached.

The DOCCS has no written policies on pregnancy tests, pregnancy options counseling, abortion, ectopic pregnancy, miscarriage, stillbirth, nutrition for pregnant and nursing women, or hysterectomies, and has incomplete policies regarding menopause, vitamins, health care for pregnant women, women in labor, or women who have recently given birth. The DOCCS policies stray from community standards in the areas of the starting age for yearly GYN check-ups, the frequency of breast exams and Pap smears, follow-up for abnormal Pap smears, frequency of prenatal visits and ultrasounds, and the time frame for postpartum check-ups for women who have a Caesarean section.

The Federal Bureau of Prisons' policy is to provide each inmate with a complete medical exam (which includes gynecological and obstetrical history) within 30 days of admission. The BOP currently adheres to the standards for yearly exams put forth by the American College of Obstetrics and Gynecology. According to a 1997 survey, approximately 90 percent of the inmates in women's state prisons reported having received a gynecologic exam from their institution upon intake. Additionally, an American Correctional Association study found that most women's correctional institutions provided OB/GYN services, prenatal and postpartum care, mammography, and Pap smears upon request. Fewer provided counseling for inmates regarding their reproductive health, many correctional facilities do not provide follow-up exams, and screenings often do not continue on the recommended schedule. In a New York city juvenile detention facility, the 5,000 youth who went through the system annually were all served by a single physician. Less than one-third of the inmates received a Pap smear test, and one in five were tested for gonorrhea, chlamydia, and syphilis.

Women often report long delays and wait times in signing up for appointments with a GYN doctor, and in getting treated. For example, more than half of respondents in a survey of incarcerated women in New York state prisons said that they were not able to see the GYN when necessary, and 47% of respondents stated that their problems became worse in the time that they had to wait. In one extreme case, Sara, a woman incarcerated in New York, had to wait seven months before she was finally diagnosed with an aggressive cancer. Another woman had to wait four months to receive a colposcopy, a follow-up to her Pap test. Another woman at the same prison wrote:

I've never seen the GYN. I dropped a tab [note to the doctor] explaining to them about being diagnosed with abnormal cells. . . and how I'd like to get a check-up, but no one answered. This was six months ago.

In a qualitative study on the experiences of incarcerated women with the Papanicolaou test (a test which screens for cervical cancer) in California state prisons, researchers found a lack of communication between medical providers within the prison, which tended to result in long delays or cancellations of treatment, no standardized process for scheduling a Pap test, and a lack of education and explanation regarding both the test itself, and how to fill out the medical forms associated with it.

In addition to this, women who aren't called in for a Pap test are sometimes required to pay a $5 fee if they request one. This can be a significant barrier to requesting a test, considering an average prisoner's wage is around 7 to 13 cents per hour.

In the same study, women brought attention to the discomfort suffered by inmates with personal histories of sexual abuse and victimization when they were forced to be examined by a male physician. Women interviewed in New York State prisons had similar complaints about their physicians' seeming lack of awareness of female prisoners' past traumas, and the lack of explanation of the procedures. One woman stated:

Ninety-nine percent of the women have been abused or raped. To have a man take us into an office the size of a closet... stripped down... [it's] rough and hurts us... it takes us right back to the beginning."

==== Perceptions of Medical Care ====
Another consideration in correctional reproductive health care is the relationship between the prisoner-patients and the physicians. Studies have shown that female inmates often report distrust of physicians and disappointment with their interactions with providers.

Researchers have found that most of the women interviewed in the 2005 California state prison study had negative perceptions of their gynecologic tests and treatment. According to the women interviewed, the prison doctors who performed their tests were often unprofessional and disrespectful. One woman described her experience, saying: "They expect us to give them respect, but they don't respect us. They treat us like we are animals just because we are incarcerated." The California prison system employs corrections officers who are also trained to be licensed nurses (called medical technical assistants). Similarly, in Chicago, the county jails train corrections officers as doulas and birth attendants. Inmates generally must request medical treatment through either these officers, or through other, non-medically trained correctional staff, and studies have shown that female patients' complaints and requests for medical assistance are often not taken as seriously as those of male patients. The simultaneous positions that these officers hold as both security personnel and medical caretakers or advocates may contribute to female inmates' distrust of them.

A 1999 study found that female inmates were more likely than their male counterparts to think that their access to health care was inadequate and that their quality of care was low compared to the care male prisoners were given. Women in this study also visited the health care facility more often than their male counterparts and reported being healthy less often than men did.

== Issues in correctional reproductive health care ==
=== Lack of resources ===
A lack of resources, specifically of adequate staff, within facilities is largely what contributes to the substandard care of inmates. For example, although California's prison system is the largest in the country, an obstetrician/gynecologist was not hired at the California Institution for Women (CIW) until pregnant prisoners in California filed a class action lawsuit (Harris v. McCarthy) against CIW. The Valley State Prison for Women (VSPW), another prison in California, had just two OB/GYN doctors on staff in 2000 (one of whom was indicted on four counts of sexual misconduct and eventually fired). Albion, a women's prison in New York State, has 1,000 prisoners, but only one GYN doctor, who works only 16 hours per week. Taconic, another facility in New York, which holds about 370 women, has no GYN doctor on site. In these cases, routine GYN care falls to the general nurse practitioner or Medical Director. In addition to the lack of staff, medical doctors are often not on duty on the weekends and evenings. This can be dangerous if medical emergencies arise during non-business hours. For example, a prisoner in CIW in 1997 went into labor over the weekend, when there was only one nurse on duty. The nurse strapped the woman into a gurney, but refused to help with her labor. When the baby was born not breathing, the nurse had to call paramedics, because she was unable to activate the breathing apparatus. By the time the newborn was transported to the hospital, he was declared brain dead.

The difficulty with recruiting qualified staff can be attributed to both the physical isolation of women's prisons (often placed in areas that are considered undesirable to live in, where there are few available medical professionals), and to the relative lack of medical resources and low salaries that prisons offer to medical staff. Dr. Valda Chijide, a former HIV doctor in an Alabama prison, for instance, resigned from her position due to inadequate support. In this case, the HIV unit was rat-infested, with broken windows covered in plastic.

=== Privatization of prison health care ===
There is also a trend towards privatizing health care by hiring outside, for-profit health care companies to provide medical care to inmates. According to a 1996 survey by the National Institute of Corrections (NIC), forty-four state Departments of Corrections contract out at least some of their medical care to private vendors - in 1996 this amounted to $706 million.

This can result in a lack of accountability, as proper monitoring makes a contract more expensive. Oversight is often lacking. In Alabama, the same official who previously held a high level position at Prison Health Services, one of the nation's largest private vendors, now works in a position within the Alabama Department of Corrections which requires her to oversee Prison Health's compliance to the contract. Prison Health Services, which has cared for 237,000 inmates, has had to pay millions of dollars in fines and settlements due to inadequate care. In another example, according to a former supervisory nurse of a jail operated by Correctional Medical Services (CMS), a large private contractor, the jail would often release pregnant women when they went into labor, and then arrest them again after they gave birth, in order to avoid having to pay for the inmates' medical expenses.

Lack of accountability also results due to varying state and federal laws on private contractors' liability for medical abuse and neglect. Private contractors can be challenged under the same federal civil rights law that applies to state and local governments, but these corporations cannot be sued for unconstitutional medical practices.

== See also ==
- Incarceration in the United States
- Incarceration of women in the United States
- Reproductive health
