= Vaughan Road Academy =

High school in Toronto, Ontario, Canada (1927–2017)

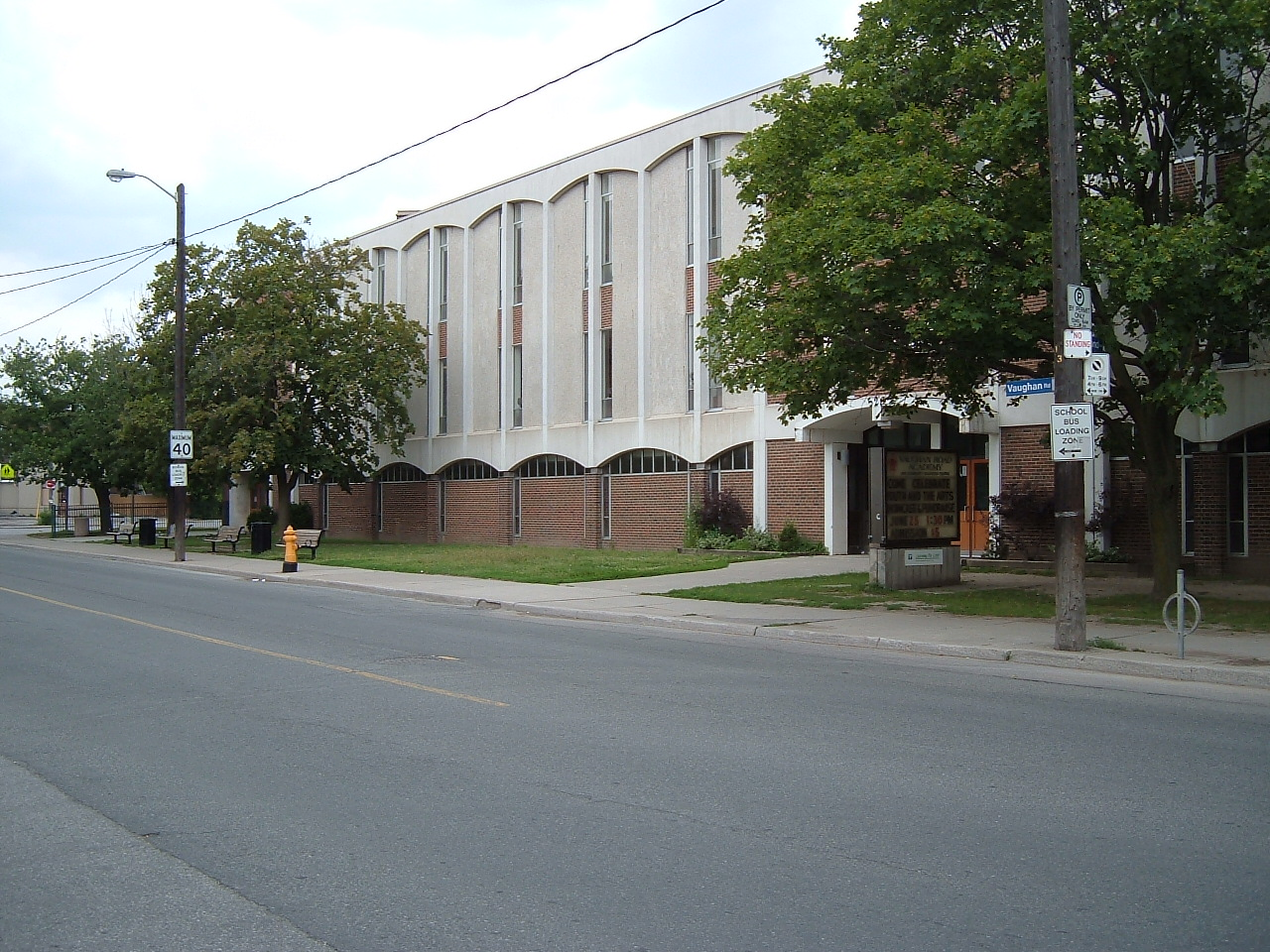

Location
- 529 Vaughan Road; Toronto, Ontario, M6C 2P7; Canada; 43.690786°N 79.436678°W

Information
- Former names: Vaughan Road High School; Vaughan Road Collegiate Institute
- School type: High school
- Motto: In Medium Quaesita Reponunt (They lay up in store for common use whatever they have gained)
- Founded: 1927
- Status: Core Holding
- Closed: 2017
- School board: Toronto District School Board
- Grades: 9–13
- Language: English
- Area: Oakwood Village
- Colours: Blue, Red, and Gold
- Mascot: Viper (formerly a Viking)
- Team name: Vaughan Road Vipers (formerly Vaughan Road Vikings)
- Website: schools.tdsb.on.ca/vaughanroad/

Vaughan Road Academy (VRA), formerly known as Vaughan Road High School and Vaughan Road Collegiate Institute, is a Toronto District School Board (TDSB) facility that formerly operated as an International Baccalaureate high school in Toronto, Ontario, Canada. It was located in the Oakwood Village neighbourhood of the former suburb of York.

The former school is situated at the Vaughan Road and Winona Drive intersection, close to Oakwood Avenue. It worked in partnership with the J.R. Wilcox and Cedarvale Community Schools, and from 1998 until the school's closure, it offered the IB Diploma Programme for students in grades 11 and 12. In addition to the International Baccalaureate, it has also had cooperative education and INTERACT programs. The school ceased to exist as an operating school on June 30, 2017, due to low enrollment and the building remains under TDSB possession to be used as a holding school (i.e. a school used to hold another school's staff and students on a temporary basis).

== History ==
=== Vaughan Road High School ===
Vaughan Road High School was the first high school built in York Township, the forerunner of the Borough of York. Construction of VRCI began in July 1926 and the cornerstone was laid by Lieutenant-Governor Henry Cockshutt in September 1926. The building was designed by architect George Roper Gouinlock, son of George Wallace Gouinlock. George Evans, the first principal, served from 1926 to 1957. In April 1927, the students moved into the school from temporary quarters in portables at Rawlinson Public School.

The school was later renamed Vaughan Road Collegiate Institute.

=== Vaughan Road Academy (1997–2017) ===
In 1997, the school was renamed Vaughan Road Academy, and began offering advanced academic, arts and athletic programs. It began offering the International Baccalaureate program in 1998. Vaughan Road Academy students also began wearing school uniforms as well.

A section of Vaughan Road Academy is used as a community daycare centre as well, even after the school's closure.

The school closed on its 90th anniversary at the end of the 2016–17 school year in June 2017 citing low attendance operating at approximately 20% of its capacity (as compared with the 1970s and the 1980s when the school was overcapacity, reaching capacity again during the mid-2000s and declined since then). Many students who live in the school's catchment area end up attending other nearby high schools such as Forest Hill Collegiate Institute to the east, which is overcapacity, as well as the nearby Oakwood Collegiate Institute to the south, which is absorbing most of the remaining students and programs.

Cynthia "Cindy" Zwicker-Reston was the school's final principal.

=== Since 2017 ===
The facility, renamed 529 Vaughan Road, is used as a temporary school for students of Davisville Public School and Spectrum Alternative School beginning in the 2018–19 school year to accommodate the construction of a new school building in Davisville Village in Midtown Toronto to replace the previous school building there. Students in Davisville Village are bused to 529 Vaughan Road.

== School programs ==
=== International Baccalaureate ===
The International Baccalaureate (IB) program allowed students to earn an IB Diploma, while also earning the Ontario Secondary School Diploma (O.S.S.D.).

=== INTERACT ===
The INTERACT program was for students in the school who are heavily involved in the arts or athletics program outside of school. These students have flexible schedules to accommodate their auditions, rehearsals, performances, competitions, etc. Notable alumni of the INTERACT program include Drake, Elliot Page (then known as Ellen Page), Alison Pill, Mark Rendall, Hans Wolfgramm and Tyler Nella. The program moved to nearby Oakwood Collegiate Institute in September 2017.

=== Cooperative education ===
Cooperative education, or Co-op, is a structured method of combining academic education with practical work experience. It was a four-credit semester program offered in World of Work (3) and Business English (1).

=== Athletics ===
Vaughan Road Academy had interscholastic and intramural teams for badminton, ball hockey, baseball, basketball, cricket, cross country running, flag football, hockey, soccer, softball, swimming, table tennis, tennis, track and field and volleyball and knuckleballs.

Vaughan Road competed in TDSSAA and Ontario Federation of School Athletic Associations (OFSAA) as the Vaughan Road Vipers, which was not to be confused with a similarly named junior hockey team in Vaughan, Ontario.

In 2004, the Vipers came second in the OFSAA 'AA' Provincial Championships and won the OFSAA 'AA' Provincial Championships in 2012.

Since the school's closure, Vaughan Road Vipers disbanded.

=== Vaughan Vox ===
Vaughan Road Academy had a school newspaper, once known as "The Von Vox, then "The Vaughan Vox", though it was sometimes simply called the "Vox". Typically, it was released twice a year. It was usually eight pages long and covered a range of school activities and issues.

=== Queer-Straight Alliance ===
Vaughan Road Academy had a large and active Queer-Straight Alliance until the school's closure in 2017. Founded in 2006 as a Gay-Straight Alliance by a small group of grade 12 students, it was reactivated in 2010.

=== Recognition for other activities ===
Vaughan Road students have participated in competitions such as the annual Sears Ontario Drama Festival, where several of the top awards for 2006 went to VRA students, and the International Olympiad in Informatics, where a VRA student received a gold medal in 2005 and silver medals in 2004 and 2006. In 2013, the short film "Homecoming," produced by grade twelve students in the Vaughan Road Academy film program, was shown in the TIFF Bell Lightbox "Jump Cuts" film festival. The following year, in 2014, Vaughan Road film students had another film in the "Jump Cuts" festival, "Nightlight."

== School motto ==
The school motto was a quote from the fourth book of Vergil's Georgics, which describes the behaviour and society of bees: In Medium Quaesita Reponunt, which means "They lay up in store for common use whatever they have gained".

== School architecture ==
VRA from above appeared as a near-isosceles right angle triangle with enclosed courtyard (in which a daycare for Vaughan Road students' children operates) of the same shape; the overall aerial view's reminiscence of The Pentagon lending the building the moniker "The Triagon". While the school letter is predictably "V" as chosen from the Latin alphabet, the lesser-known Greek school letter, Delta, is derived from the building's shape; as in the sciences, Delta denotes change.

The first wing of the school was built in 1926, the second in 1931, and the third, which closed the "L" and turned it into a triangle, in 1967.

== Notable alumni ==
- Cameron Ansell (1992–), voice actor for Arthur Read. Enrolled in INTERACT
- Gord Ash (1951–), general manager for the Toronto Blue Jays from 1995 to 2001.
- Neve Campbell (1973–), film and television actress
- Charles Dennis (1946–) author, playwright, actor, filmmaker.
- Drake (1986–), actor and musician
- Sidney J. Furie (1933–), film director
- Keir Gilchrist (1992–), Actor. Enrolled in INTERACT
- Don Harron (1924–2015), actor, author, and broadcaster.
- William Hutt (1920–2007), actor, director, Companion of the Order of Canada (1969), Order of Ontario (1992)
- Bob Kaplan (1936–2012), former MP who was Solicitor General of Canada from 1980 to 1984.
- Stathis Kappos (1979–), professional soccer player.
- Monte Kwinter (1931–2023), member of the Legislative Assembly of Ontario since 1985.
- Larry D. Mann (1922–2014), actor best known for voicing the character Yukon Cornelius in the animated Christmas classic Rudolph the Red-Nosed Reindeer.
- Anne Michaels (1958–), author, winner of the Trillium Prize, the Chapters/Books in Canada First Novel Award
- Charles Pachter (1942–), contemporary artist, Order of Canada recipient
- Elliot Page (1987–), best known for his titular role in the film Juno, and Kitty Pryde in X-Men: The Last Stand.
- Marita Payne-Wiggins (1960–), former track and field athlete and two-time Olympic silver medallist; mother of Andrew Wiggins and wife of Mitchell Wiggins
- Alison Pill (1985–), actress who is best known for the HBO drama The Newsroom, the Toronto-based movie Scott Pilgrim vs. the World, and was nominated for a Tony Award for her performance in The Lieutenant of Inishmore. Enrolled in INTERACT.
- Brandon Pirri (1991–), drafted 2nd round to the National Hockey League (NHL)'s Chicago Blackhawks in 2009. Enrolled in INTERACT
- Mark Rendall (1988–), actor
- Siluck Saysanasy, (1974–), Laotian-Canadian television actor best known for playing Yick Yu, a character from the Degrassi series. Enrolled in INTERACT
- Dr. Arthur Leonard Schawlow (1921–1999), research scientist, educator, Nobel Laureate (1981), Professor of Physics, Emeritus, Stanford University
- Melinda Shankar (1992–), actress on the Canadian hit Degrassi: The Next Generation. Enrolled in INTERACT
- Eileen Tallman Sufrin (1913–1999), author and labour activist, awarded the Governor General's Medal
- Robyn Urback (1988–), National Post and The Globe and Mail columnist and editorial board member.
- Al Waxman (1935–2001), actor, broadcaster, author, philanthropist, Order of Ontario (1996), Order of Canada (1997).
- Samantha Weinstein (1995–2023), film and television actress
- Noam Zylberman (1973–), film and television actor.

== See also ==
- List of high schools in Ontario
