= Vaughan Road =

Thoroughfare in Toronto, Ontario

Coordinates: 43.6889°N 79.4325°W

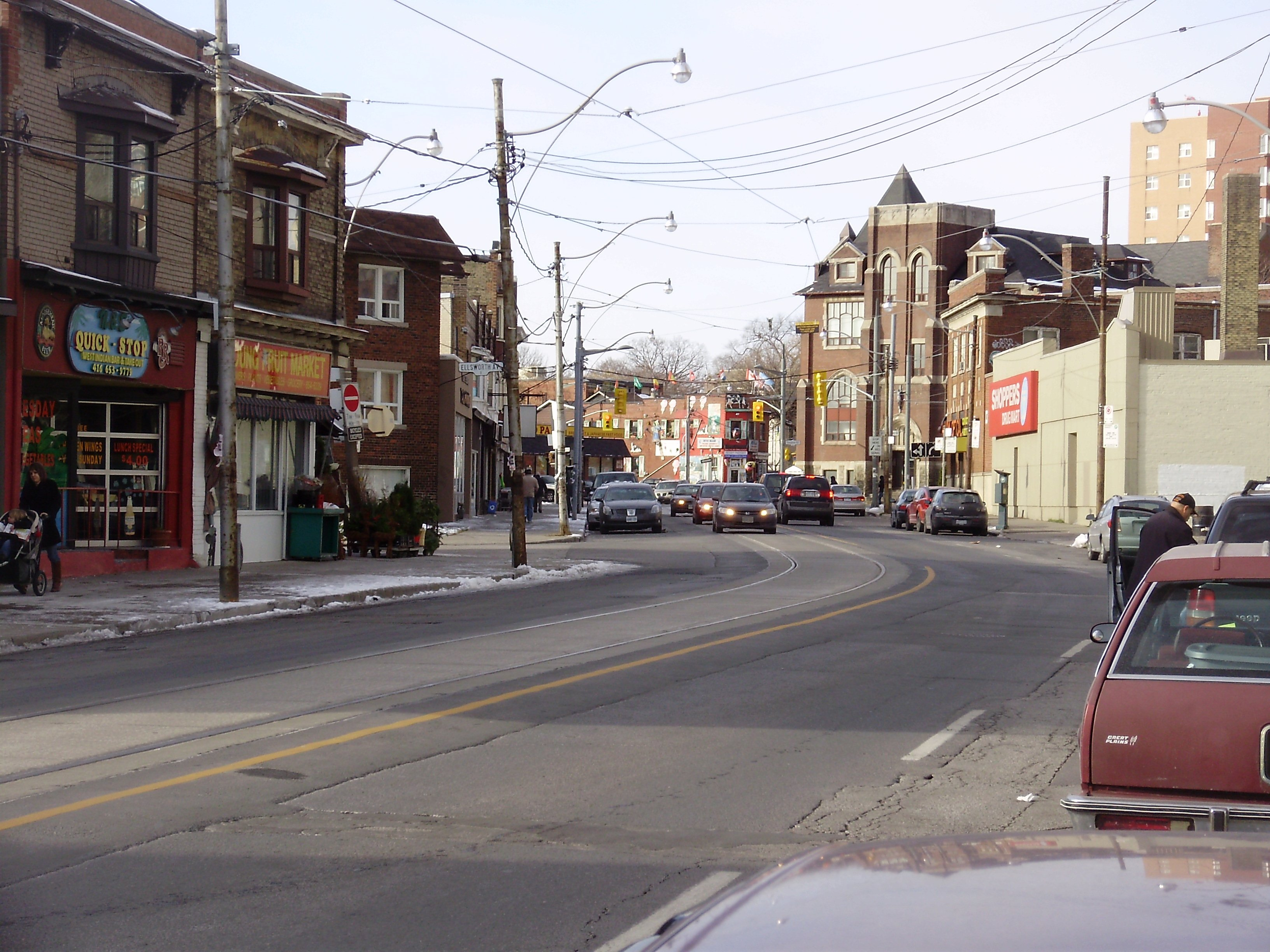
- Vaughan Road is aligned northwest–southeast between Bathurst and St. Clair. Note the single streetcar track in the Old Toronto segment.

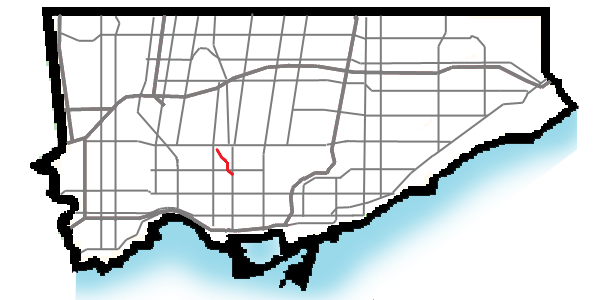
- Maintained by: City of Toronto government
- Location: Toronto
- Northwest end: Near Eglinton Avenue
- Major junctions: St. Clair Avenue
- Southeast end: Bathurst Street

Vaughan Road is a road in Toronto, Ontario, Canada. It is a contour collector road that is parallel to a buried creek to the north called Castle Frank Brook. Vaughan Road begins on Bathurst Street south of St. Clair Avenue West, then it becomes a north–south street, hence its address numbering system, then it becomes a northwest–southeast street. Finally, Vaughan Road ends in a dead-end near Fairbank station at the intersection of Eglinton Avenue and Dufferin Street. Vaughan Road Academy is named after this road.

== History ==
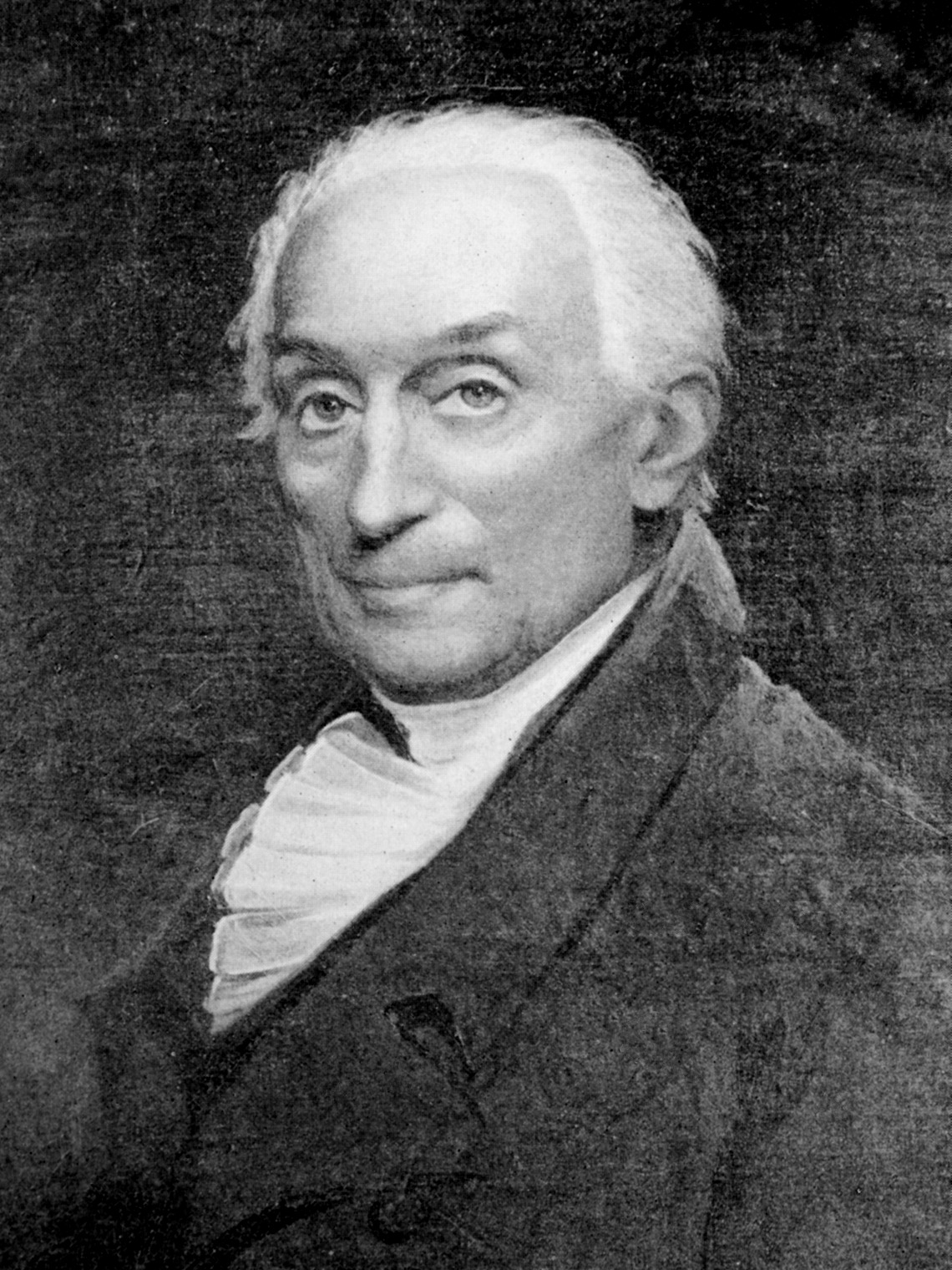
Vaughan Road is indirectly named after Benjamin Vaughan

Vaughan Road was built as early as 1850. Before then, it was a trail used by the First Nations. Its original alignment began at Yonge Street, followed Davenport Road to Bathurst Street, then along the current alignment of Vaughan Road into Dufferin Street; in fact, there is still a curve in Dufferin Street at the intersection with Eglinton Avenue, where Vaughan Road connected. By the 1960s, Vaughan Road was closed before it could connect with Eglinton; an Esso gas station and parkette later occupied the former right of way and intersection, but demolished in the mid-2010s to accommodate Fairbank station of Line 5 Eglinton, which opened in 2026. Vaughan Road was then extended north along what is now Dufferin Street into Vaughan Township, which later became the City of Vaughan. Therefore, Vaughan Road is named after the township, which itself is named after Benjamin Vaughan, a British commissioner who signed a peace treaty with the United States in 1783.

This road was popular with street racers in the 1950s due to its many curves from being parallel to a creek. Since 2000, Vaughan Road had undergone the early stages of gentrification, especially at the corner of Oakwood and Vaughan, as well as the former City of Toronto stretch of Vaughan Road.

The name was a subject of controversy in recent years. Following the murder of George Floyd in 2020, the city will consider to rename Vaughan Road in the future, although the former Vaughan Secondary School was renamed to Hodan Nalayeh Secondary School in 2021.

== Public transit ==
The road passes through the communities of Humewood–Cedarvale and Oakwood–Vaughan. The Toronto Transit Commission bus route 90 Vaughan serves these communities. The terminus of the route are St. Clair West and Cedarvale stations. There is also a stop at Vaughan Road on the 512 St. Clair streetcar route. The Old City of Toronto segment of the road features an active southbound streetcar track; this formed part of the loop used by Bathurst streetcars to return south, until the route was truncated to Bathurst Station. The track still serves an important role, being the only route by which St. Clair streetcars can leave St. Clair Avenue to connect to the rest of the system for storage and maintenance; although unmarked on transit maps, passengers are generally permitted on streetcars headed south along Bathurst Street via this connector.

== Landmarks ==
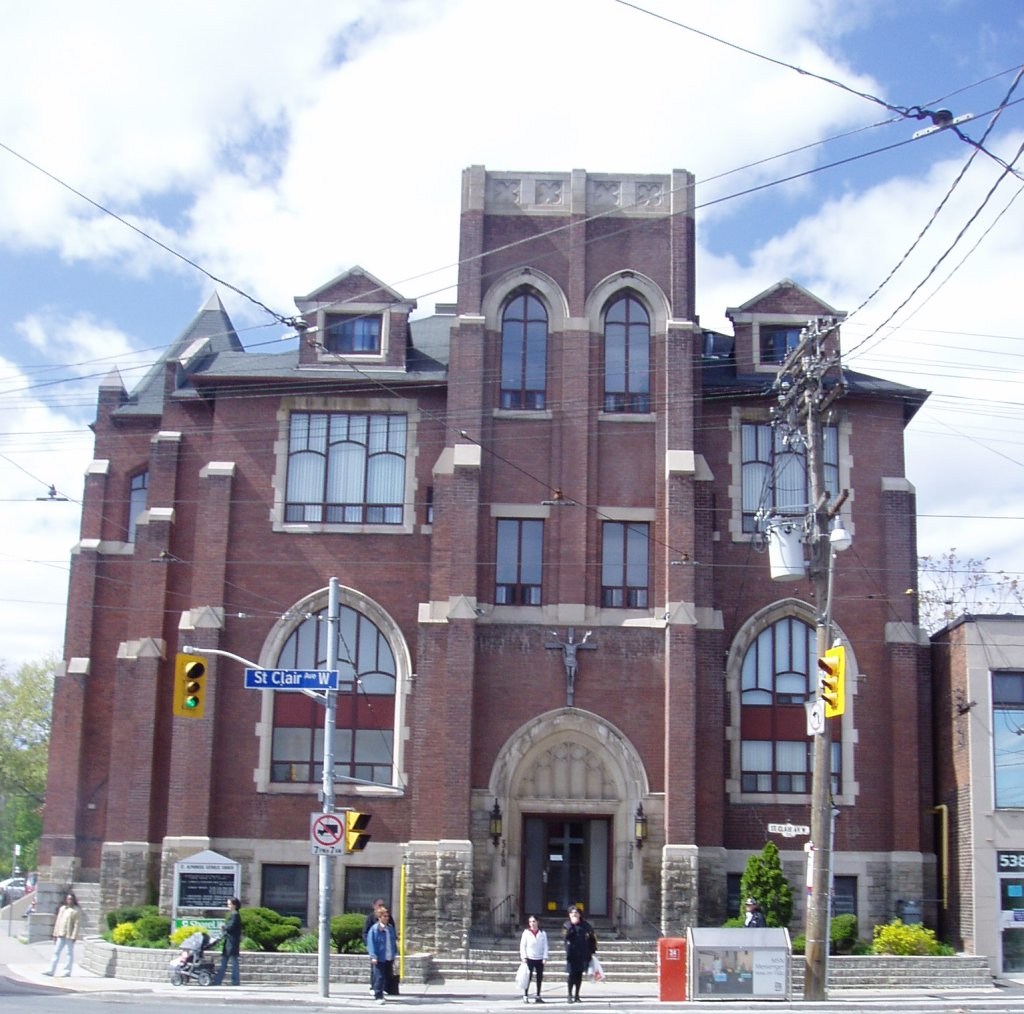
Constructed in 1911, St. Alphonsus Roman Catholic Church is a landmark near Vaughan Road

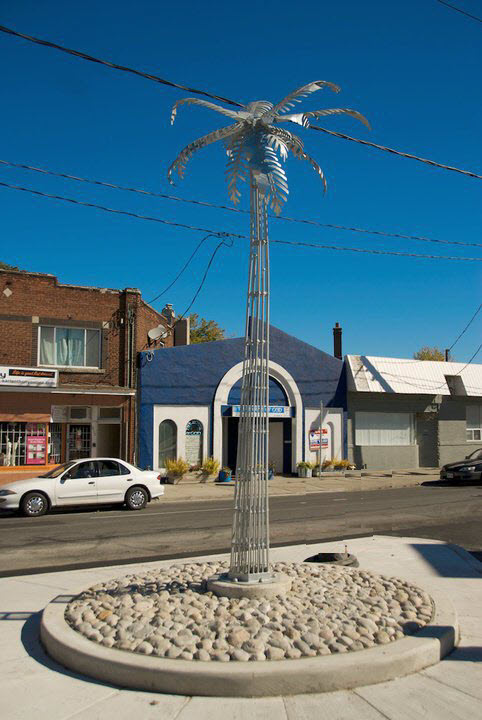
This steel palm tree at the intersection of Oakwood and Vaughan both unites the community and generates controversy on its own

- Doors painted by Nikki Abraham on the west side of Vaughan Road south of St. Clair Avenue; the artwork is inspired by Piet Mondrian's Broadway Boogie Woogie
- Albert's Real Jamaican Foods
- St. Alphonsus Roman Catholic Church, first constructed as a Presbyterian, then United Church of Canada congregation named St. Columba, that merged with St. Clair Avenue United Church to become St. Matthew's in 1966.
- Dutch Dreams (established in 1985 by Theo Aben, it is among Toronto's best known independent ice cream parlours and competes with Albert's Real Jamaican Foods)
- Hogtown Mascots, which has exclusive Canadian rights to design and manufacture Muppets (including those in Sesame Street) and costumes based on them for the Canadian market, as well as manufactured mascots for popular non-children's television programs in North America
- Vaughan Road Academy, a Toronto District School Board high school first opened on 1927, but closed in 2017 due to low enrollment
- A steel palm tree, built upon a newly constructed bus bay and traffic island at the southeast corner of Oakwood and Vaughan, was erected by the city of Toronto as a tribute to the Caribbean character of the neighbourhood. Rob Davis opposed this project because of the cost of the project. "According to the invoice provided by the tree’s craftsman, the steel sculpture cost $4,200, tax and delivery included. (The 5 Point Community Action group originally considered aluminum for the tree, but opted for the cheaper hot-dipped galvanized steel.)... Although the cost of the whole project (which Davis opposes) totals about $350,000, the island’s metal centrepiece is a small part of the final price..."
