= Gvirtz =

Gvirtz (Hebrew: גבירץ) is a Jewish surname, a Hebrew variant of the West Ashkenazi Jewish Yiddish surname געווירץ variously spelled Gevirtz/Gevirts/Gewirtz/Gewertz literally meaning "spice". Notable people with the surname include:

- Raquel Gvirtz (1924–2013) Argentinian social activist of Jewish descent.
- Reuven Gvirtz, musician from the Israeli vocal group Milk and Honey
- Yael Gvirtz, Israeli journalist and social activist, founder of the NGO Elifelet
