= CFU758 =

High school radio station in Ontario, Canada

Coordinates: 43°47′53″N 79°28′7″W

Vaughan, Ontario; Canada
- Broadcast area: Northern Toronto and Southern York Region
- Frequency: 90.7 MHz
- Branding: 90.7 RAV FM

Programming
- Format: High school radio/Community radio

Ownership
- Owner: Hodan Nalayeh Secondary School under the governance of the York Region District School Board

History
- First air date: 1999
- Former frequencies: 106.3 MHz (1999–2002)

Technical information
- Class: Low-power station

Links
- Website: rav907fm.wordpress.com

CFU758 is a low-power broadcaster, using the on-air brand 90.7 RAV FM. It is the only licensed high school radio station in Thornhill, Ontario, and is owned and operated by Hodan Nalayeh Secondary School. RAV FM is part of the school's radio broadcasting course, and is one of a small number of Canadian radio stations licensed to a high school.

== History ==
RAV FM first signed on in 1999 on 106.3 MHz, utilizing a combination of students and faculty as station operators and program directors.

Rob Basile was the station's original founder, and a teacher at Hodan Nalayeh Secondary School. Under Basile's guidance, the station voluntarily changed to 90.7 MHz to avoid interference with CKAV-FM in 2002. After launching CIRR-FM at the beginning of 2007, he remained that station's program director, the duties of program director were given to Chris "Punch" Andrews, who also continued his on-air duties at CKFM-FM. After the death of Andrews in 2008, Ronald Johnson was named the new program director of the station. To honour the memory of Andrews, the studio was renamed the Punch Andrews Studio. Up until this point it was student-led broadcasting and was still using the original mixer board donated to the station by CHUM FM. In 2009, Matthew Rondina, a media teacher at Hodan Nalayeh Secondary School assumed the program director, removing the elements of student leadership and independence from the station. The original equipment was removed and the studio was completely changed. Under Rondina's changes students were no longer able to run their own shows and the station ceased to exist as a club/ extra curricular activity.

Because RAV FM is no longer student-led, the station continues to run without student support during off times in the scholar year, using a set playlist.

== Studio and Equipment ==
RAV FM provides a low power signal from on top of Hodan Nalayeh Secondary School. The studios are located on the second floor of the school. Additional equipment is placed on the restricted fourth floor. The radio station was originally equipped with iMediaTouch Quickpix and iMediaTouch OpLog automation software. Music scheduling was done using MusicMaster. The radio station also used a Nicom transmitter and Omnia 3 Turbo on air processor. All audio was logged using iMediaLogger. Currently, the station utilizes an Allen & Heath XB–14 radio broadcast mixer, equipped with four microphones, a telephone and a main broadcast computer to transmit music and other audio elements.

== Signal ==
This signal is fairly strong around the school, and travels farthest in a southwest direction from the school toward York University and Jane and Finch. The approximate diameter for reception of RAV-FM under normal weather conditions is as far north as Elgin Mills Road, as far west as Highway 400, as far south as Sheppard Avenue and as far east as Yonge Street. Reception will vary greatly depending on the radio being used.

== Broadcasting Course ==
RAV FM was originally run as an extracurricular activity consisting of student-led shows based on a variety of subjects, such as sports, news and music. During the 2012–2013 scholar year, RAV ceased to exist as an extracurricular activity, and became a course, under the code AWS 201. The course has since been taught by Matthew Rondina and explores radio communication as well as the entertainment industry aspects of broadcasting, including social networking.

== Co-operative Education Program ==
During the 2013–2014 scholar year, RAV FM became a co-operative education work placement. Students would assume the role of studio manager and assume the duties of day–to–day operation of the studio and station. These duties include social media updates, music library/playlist updates and promotions/advertising.

== COVID-19 ==
RAV-FM shutdown at the beginning of the COVID-19 pandemic. The station is not currently in operation, but there are plans to revitalize the broadcasting course and subsequently the radio room in the school. This recommencement of the use of the room should begin by late 2023.
