= Use of restraints on pregnant women =

The use of shackles or restraints on pregnant women is a common practice in prisons and jails in the United States, but also documented in countries including Australia, Great Britain, and Japan. Shackling refers to the use of physical restraints such as handcuffs, leg shackles, and belly chains on parts of an individuals body. The shackling of pregnant women commonly occurs while they are transported within a facility, transported to a hospital, and/or during and after childbirth. In the United States, pregnant migrants may also experience shackling while in immigration detention facilities.

Though medical professionals concur that pregnant women and babies under correctional custody face unique healthcare risks, custody policies often do not address their health and safety needs. Those in carceral facilities typically lack of routine prenatal care and adequate nutrition. There is also a risk of experiencing physical and emotional abuse, mental health issues, and untreated sexually transmitted infections. Specifically, shackling can threaten maternal and child health by increasing risk of falls, blood clots and other conditions.

== Background ==
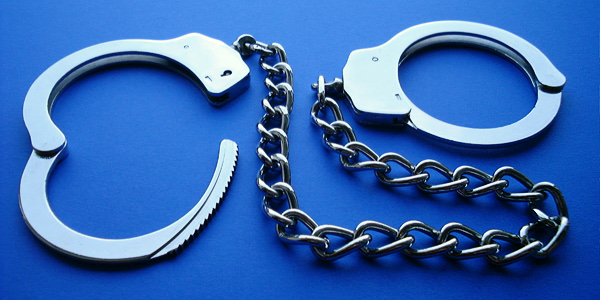
Standard leg shackles

There is a disproportionately higher percentage of males than females incarcerated across the United States. From 2016 to 2018, the Bureau of Justice Statistics showed that women comprised 10% of all people in prisons and jails, though represented 27% of cases involving sexual misconduct and harassment from staff. While women are more likely than men to be in custody for drug offenses, they are less likely to be in custody for violent crimes or become violent recidivists.

Since correctional facilities mainly house violent male offenders, shackling protocols are derived from policies developed to restrain men rather than security concerns about pregnant persons. Consequently, the use of shackles on women in general, and pregnant women in particular, is controversial. Moreover, women of color are incarcerated at higher rates across the United States, so Black and Hispanic women are disproportionately affected by policies designed to control male inmates with a higher risk of violence.

=== Pregnant inmates ===
The Bureau of Justice Assistance (BJA) reported in 2014 that 4% of state and 3% of federal inmates were pregnant upon intake. The report also found that 5% of women already incarcerated at the time were pregnant. The federal government does not collect statistics about incarcerated pregnant women or their health outcomes at regular intervals. The Pregnancy in Prison Statistics (PIPS) Project, led by Johns Hopkins University medical researcher Carolyn Sufrin, found that of the 1,400 pregnant women admitted to state and federal prisons in 2016 to 2017, 800 of those pregnancies resulted in births while the mother was still in custody.

The government also does not track pregnancy statistics in juvenile justice facilities. From 2016 to 2017, a PIPS study of three juvenile detention centers found that pregnancy rates among incarcerated youth and adults are similar.

There is also little available data on the use of restraints on pregnant women in custody. However, a 2016 to 2017 PIPS study found that state prisons and jails reported the routine use of restraints en route to hospitals for pre-natal health appointments and delivery, immediately following childbirth, and during transportation to court appearances while pregnant, even in states where one or more of these practices is illegal.

== Opposing viewpoints ==
There are three primary justifications used to support the use of restraint on pregnant women. First, restraints prevent inmates from bringing harm to themselves and others; second, restraints prevent the escape or attempt to escape of pregnant women; and third, restraints are meant to maintain security in general. These justifications are identical to those used to support the use of restraints on male and female inmates in general population across various state and federal facilities. Moreover, correctional department officials also cite their responsibility or burden to balance the health and safety of the inmate with that of the public in further support of the use of restraints on pregnant women.

Those who oppose of the practice offer several counterarguments to these justifications. They argue foremost the use of restraints on pregnant women raises important human rights concerns and increases the health risks to the woman and her child. Conversely, many in the international community are quick to point out pregnant women are lower security threats to themselves and others than men. In particular, the International Human Rights Clinic, CLAIM, and the American Civil Liberties Union (ACLU) filed a joint report stating that "[w]omen who are pregnant, in labor, or in postpartum recovery are especially low flight and safety risks." In support of this point of view, Geraldine Doetzer in "Hard Labor" states that pregnant women who are in active labor "are physically much less able to mount an attack or escape attempt."

== Health risks and concerns ==
The American College of Obstetricians and Gynecologists (ACOG), the American Public Health Association, the American Medical Association and others have raised many health concerns surrounding the use of shackles on pregnant women. These concerns frequently cite increased risks to maternal and child health resulting from shackling. While pregnant, shackles can increase the risk of falling where a woman's center of gravity is shifted by the pregnant uterus. For example, restraints placed on a woman's wrists also prevent her from breaking a fall and protecting herself and her abdomen. In regards to sickness and treatment, the use of shackles complicates the assessment of physical and other medical conditions before and during the process of childbirth. This includes diagnostic tests to determine the source of abdominal pains and nausea, vaginal bleeding, and hypertensive diseases, which occur in 12–22% of pregnancies. These conditions pose severe threats to the health of the mother and the fetus.

Restraints can also interfere with normal labor and delivery of the child. It can be important for women to be able to walk around during labor to alleviate pain and be able to be moved quickly in case a Caesarean section becomes necessary. Problems such as complications from hemorrhages, a decrease in fetal heart tones, or preeclampsia often necessitate an emergency C-section. For these reasons, the American Public Health Association, warns "[w]omen must never be shackled during labor and delivery."

Following childbirth, restraints can interfere with the mother's ability to safely handle their infant, and interfere in creating a close bond. The restriction in mobility from restraints can place the woman at increased risk for contracting the thromboembolic disease and getting a postpartum hemorrhage.

== Policy perspectives ==
=== State and local ===
States in the US have moved toward eliminating or greatly reducing the use of restraints on pregnant women in their facilities. While 41 states and Washington, D.C. have laws limiting the use of restraints on pregnant women, the extent and enforcement of these policies vary widely. Of the states that have passed restrictions, many still include broad exceptions. However, a number of states allow for the unrestricted use of restraints on pregnant women. As of February 2024, the nine states with no anti-shackling legislation were Michigan, Alaska, Montana, Wyoming, North Dakota, South Dakota, Kansas, Iowa, and Wisconsin.

In 2014, the Bureau of Justice Assistance (BJA) under the U.S. Department of Justice released a report entitled "Best Practices in the Use of Restraints with Pregnant Women and Girls under Correctional Custody". It was created by the National Task Force on the Use of Restraints with Pregnant Women under Correctional Custody to guide and assist institutions and jurisdictions in "the development of local policy and practice". The report outlines five key principles on which the Task Force reached a consensus, and 11 recommendations concerning the use of restraints on pregnant women. The five principles discuss the importance of written policies and procedures on the use of restraints during custody and transport, who should be writing these policies, the unique healthcare needs and circumstance of pregnant women and girls, the related health risks posed by restraints, and the limitation on the use of restraints to "absolute necessity." The 11 recommendations outline specific cases in which the use of restraints should be prohibited, avoided and/or limited, as well as what facility standard operating procedures should include regarding the use of restraints on pregnant women. ACOG standards specifically state that the use of restraints on pregnant incarcerated women and adolescents compromises health care and is inhumane.

==== Massachusetts ====
In April 2014, Massachusetts passed an act allowing for the use of restraints in "extraordinary circumstances". Such "extraordinary circumstances" include anytime a corrections officer deems it necessary that restraints be used to prevent a pregnant inmate from escaping or from causing self-injury or injuring medical or correctional personnel. In 2022, Massachusetts passed an amendment to prohibit the use of restraints on pregnant or postpartum individuals in any circumstances, requiring staff of carceral facilities to be trained annually on this policy.

==== Pennsylvania ====
In Pennsylvania, over 100 pregnant women were shackled during a year-long period between July 2012 to June 2013. In 2023, the Pennsylvania legislature expanded a 2010 law to create stronger protections for incarcerated pregnant women. The law restricts restraints during pregnancy, labor, and postpartum except in exceptional cases where the least restrictive restraints may be employed.

==== California ====
In January 2006, California passed legislation stating that a pregnant "inmate shall not be shackled by the wrists, ankles, or both during labor, including during transport to a hospital, during delivery, and while in recovery after giving birth." In 2012, they expanded the ban to include shackling of incarcerated women throughout pregnancy.

==== Maryland ====
Maryland restricted the use of restraints throughout pregnancy, transportation, labor, deliver, and postpartum recovery. Their policy also specifies that custody officers must heed requests by healthcare providers to remove restraints.

==== Florida ====
Florida prohibits use of restraints on pregnant prisoners at all times during labor, delivery, and postpartum recovery unless a corrections official makes an individualized determination that the prisoner presents an extraordinary circumstance requiring restraints.

==== West Virginia ====
West Virginia law states that pregnant inmates will not be restrained after reaching the second trimester of pregnancy until the end of the pregnancy, unless she poses a threat of escape or safety of herself, the public, staff, or the fetus. Then the inmate may be restrained, but she will also consult with an appropriate health care professional to assure that the manner of restraint will not pose an unreasonable risk of harm to the inmate or the fetus.

==== Rhode Island ====
Rhode Island's policy, passed in 2012, states that pregnant inmates cannot be restrained in their second or third trimester unless deemed medically appropriate.

==== Hawaii ====
Hawaii law states that no restraints may be used on any committed female from the third trimester of her pregnancy through postpartum recovery or during any portion of her pregnancy if her physician so orders, except in extraordinary circumstances.

==== Idaho ====
Idaho law states that a correctional institution cannot use restraints on a prisoner known to be pregnant during labor and delivery, except in an extraordinary circumstance where a corrections official makes an individualized determination that restraints are necessary to prevent a prisoner from escaping or injuring herself.

==== Washington ====
In Washington, the use of restraints on pregnant women or youth in custody is allowed only in extraordinary circumstances.

=== Federal ===
In 2008, the Federal Bureau of Prisons mandated that in all federal correctional facilities, "inmates in labor, delivery, or post-delivery recuperations shall not be placed in restraints unless there are reasonable grounds to believe the inmate presents an immediate serious threat of hurting herself or others, or there are reasonable grounds to believe the inmate presents an immediate and credible risk of escape." In April 2008, President George W. Bush signed the Second Chance Act into law, requiring all federal facilities to document and report "the use of physical restraints on pregnant female prisoners during pregnancy, labor, delivery, and post-delivery and justify the use of restraints with documented security concerns". This shift in federal policy, limiting and reporting the use of restraints on pregnant women parallels the policy changes being made at the state and local levels mentioned above.

The FIRST STEP Act prohibits the use of restraints on pregnant women, unless the woman "is an immediate and credible flight risk that cannot reasonably be prevented by other means" or "poses an immediate and serious threat of harm to herself or others that cannot reasonably be prevented by other means" or "a healthcare professional responsible for the health and safety of the prisoner determines that the use of restraints is appropriate for the medical safety of the prisoner." The law mandates that the least restrictive restraints necessary be used in those situations.

Since 2018, members of the United States Congress have repeatedly introduced legislature bills to extend protections for pregnant women, citing persistent abuses in federal jails and prisons. Representative Sydney Kamlager-Dove and former representative Debbie Lesko introduced the Pregnant Women in Custody Act in 2023. This bipartisan legislation aimed to educate prison employees on the physical and mental health consequences of using restraints on women during the prepartum, peripartum, and postpartum stages of pregnancy. It also proposed that prisons consider alternatives to restraints and give health care providers the right to bar the use of restraints on their incarcerated patients.

In February 2025, Senators Jon Ossoff and John Kennedy introduced another bill, the Births in Custody Reporting Act, to improve care for women's in federal correctional facilities. Ossoff, who chairs the U.S. Senate Human Rights Subcommittee, drafted the bill in response to accounts of pregnant women subjected to illegal shackling around their midsections and other abusive practices in Georgia prisons.

In response to accounts of shackling and mistreatment of pregnant women in immigration detention centers, Congressional Democrats have also attempted to pass legislature prohibiting agencies of the Department of Homeland Security from shackling pregnant migrants. In 2023, Representative Sylvia Garcia and Senator Patty Murray reintroduced the Stop Shackling and Detaining Pregnant Women Act to prevent the shackling of migrants in the custody of Immigration and Customs Enforcement (ICE) and Customs and Border Protection (CBP), among other protections for migrant women.

=== International ===
The international community has widely criticized the use of shackles on pregnant women by correctional facilities in the United States. The practice has been described as violating the following international policies: Articles 7 and 10 of the International Covenant on Civil and Political Rights (ICCPR) Article 16 of the Convention Against Torture (CAT), and the United Nations Standard Minimum Rules for the Treatment of Prisoners. Responding to reports presented by Amnesty International, the United Nations Human Rights Committee recommended in 2006 that the United States "prohibit the shackling of detained women during childbirth" to comply with the aforementioned international treaties. They proposed that the U.S. enact a federal ban on shackling pregnant prisoners, ensure that states without anti-shackling laws implement other measures such as the training of correctional officers, review the scope and enforcement of current anti-shackling laws, and collect data to understand the scope and persistence of shackling in the U.S. This recommendation spurred many state and federal policies enacted to eliminate or reduce the use of shackles on pregnant women.

United Kingdom

In the United Kingdom, the Home Office bans the use of waist restraint belts or leg restraints on pregnant women, though other restraints may be used if the pregnant person is considered a high security risk.

The movement to end shackling in the United Kingdom gained momentum in 1996, when Ann Widdecombe, the former Minister of State for Prisons, defended the Prison Service's policy of handcuffing women during labor. Widdecombe justified her position by citing that 20 women inmates had escaped from hospitals from 1990 to 1996, though none of these individuals were in labor. Her statement prompted a public outcry, resulting in a reversal of the shackling policy.

Australia

In Australia, policies on shackling pregnant women varies regionally. In Western Australia, the Independent Inspector of Custodial Services reported in 2020 that custodial facilities routinely used restrains on pregnant women, even those classified as low or no risk. The report noted that restraints were used on pregnant women who were attending medical appointments or even unconscious. The South Australia Ombudsman conducted an investigation of shackling hospitalized prisoners and concluded that restraints should only be employed in situations where the inmate poses a significant security threat. In Victoria, the Department of Justice states that pregnant prisoners should not be subject to restraints without sufficient security risk and "prior approval of the appropriate authority."

Japan

In 2014, Japan imposed a directive on all penal facilities restricting the shackling of pregnant women in the delivery room. However, Japan's Justice Ministry found multiple violations of this directive from 2014 to 2022, prompting additional prohibitions on use of restraints for incarcerated individuals caring for their babies. Japan also moved in March 2024 to issue an even broader ban on using restraints on pregnant women before, during, and after labor.

== Legal perspectives ==
On the legal front, the use of restraints on pregnant women has been repeatedly challenged for violating the Eighth Amendment of the United States Constitution, which prohibits "cruel and unusual punishment". In a 2009 landmark decision, the United States Court of Appeals for the Eighth Circuit supported this claim in the case, Nelson v. Correctional Medical Services. Nelson was a non-violent inmate who suffered cramps and extreme pain while shackled during labor and immediately after delivery of her son. The Court held that the Arkansas law "'clearly established' that shackling a woman prisoner during labor and delivery violated the Eighth Amendment, imposing cruel and unusual punishment." In their Judicial Opinion the Court cited Estelle v. Gamble, in which the Supreme Court held "deliberate indifference" to provide medical care to incarcerated populations violated the Eighth Amendment based on the government's obligation to abide by "an evolving standard of human decency".

The practice of shackling pregnant women was also challenged in Women Prisoners of the District of Columbia Department of Corrections, et al. v. District of Columbia. In 1993, the U.S. District Court for the District of Columbia ruled in favor of female inmates in the District's correctional facilities. The court held that the correctional system's lack of medical care, indifference to inmates' health and safety, and shackling of pregnant prisoners violated the Eighth Amendment.
