= Robyn Urback =

Canadian journalist

- Born: 1988 (age 37–38); Toronto, Ontario
- Education: Ryerson University (2010; Bachelor of Journalism (Honours))
- Occupation: Journalist
- Years active: 2008-present
- Employer: The Globe and Mail

Robyn Urback (born 1988) is a Canadian journalist and conservative political commentator. She is known for her work at the National Post, and as of 2020 writes an opinion column for The Globe and Mail.

== Early life and education ==
Urback is a native of Toronto, Ontario, Canada, is Jewish, and attended Vaughan Road Academy in Toronto. While studying journalism at Ryerson University, she was presented with the 2008 Albert E. Wadham Memorial Award as well as the 2008 Rolf Lockwood Scholarship for Excellence in Business Magazine feature writing. She graduated from Ryerson in 2010 with a Bachelor of Journalism (Honours).

== Career ==
By 2010, Urback was contributing opinion articles to Maclean's Magazine, at first concentrating on student issues. Urback later began to contribute articles and commentary to major news outlets about a variety of topics, including women's issues, crime, local interest topics, politics and world affairs.

By 2013 her work was being published regularly as a columnist in the National Post, where she also became an editorial board member.

In 2016 Urback was hired as an opinion columnist and opinion section producer for the Canadian Broadcasting Corporation. She worked there through 22 October 2019.

She has been working for The Globe and Mail, where she is a current affairs columnist, since 2019.
