= Gewertz =

Gewertz is a West Ashkenazi Jewish Yiddish surname געווירץ variously spelled Gevertz/Gevirtz/Gevirts/Gewirth/Gewirtz/Gvirtz literally meaning "spice". Notable people with the surname include:

- Bruce L. Gewertz (born 1949), American vascular surgeon
- Deborah Gewertz (born 1948), American anthropologist
- Kenneth A. Gewertz (1934–2006), American politician
