= Raquel Gvirtz =

Human rights activist

Fanny Raquel Gvirtz de Arcuschin (1924 – 27 September 2013) was one of the founders of the Grandmothers of the Plaza de Mayo, a human rights organization dedicated to finding the children stolen and illegally adopted during the Argentine dictatorship.

== Background ==
Her parents were Russian Jewish immigrants, and settled in the Province of San Juan. Gvirtz was born in Buenos Aires. After studying at a commercial school, she started working at an accounting firm. At 24 years old she married Elías de Arcuschin.

Her sons were Miguel Sergio Archuschin and Adrián Archuschin and students at the Escuela Superior de Comercio Carlos Pellegrini, one of the most prestigious high schools in Latin America. Miguel was an activist against the Argentine dictatorship and arrested with his younger brother. Adrián was a minor at the time of the arrest and released after 10 days. Miguel was never released, and is part of the ‘disappeared’ of the Dirty War (Victims kidnapped, tortured and murdered whose bodies were disappeared by the military government). Miguel was last seen with his pregnant wife Noemí Jansenson at Campo de Mayo, a secret detention center where newborn babies were kidnapped from pregnant women before they were executed. Afterwards the newborns were given to people loyal to the military dictature.

Raquel was on the first women to walk the Plaza de Mayo, demanding to know where her newborn grandchild was brought. After the dictatorship came to an end she started working with the U.S. geneticist Mary-Claire King on matching grandparents with their kidnapped grandchildren, a work she continued until her death in 2013.
