= Eileen Tallman Sufrin =

Canadian author and labour activist

- Born: Blanche Eileen Tallman; January 19, 1913; Montreal, Quebec, Canada
- Died: March 20, 1999 (aged 86); White Rock, British Columbia, Canada

Blanche Eileen Tallman Sufrin (née Tallman; January 19, 1913 – March 20, 1999) was a Canadian author and labour activist. In 1942, she led a strike of bank employees in Montreal, the first strike in the Canadian banking industry. She later led a drive to unionize employees at Eaton's and helped organize 9,000 Eaton's employees between 1948 and 1952. While the attempt was unsuccessful, the pressure led Eaton’s to increase employee salaries and benefits. In 1979, Sufrin was one of seven women awarded the Governor General’s Medal, commemorating the 50th anniversary of the Persons Case.

== Early life ==
Sufrin was born in Montreal on January 19, 1913, and raised in Toronto. Her father was a travelling salesman for a men's clothing company and her mother had been a dressmaker before marrying. After graduating head of her class at Vaughan Road Collegiate, she completed a diploma in stenography and bookkeeping. She worked as a teacher and, later, an office worker.

== Labour activism ==
In the 1930s, Sufrin became involved in the Co-operative Commonwealth Youth Movement (CCYM), the youth wing of the Co-operative Commonwealth Federation (CCF), the precursor to the New Democratic Party (NDP). Sufrin was active in the Ontario CCYM throughout the 1930s and, when the CCF established a trade union committee in 1937, she was named secretary.

=== Banque Canadienne Nationale strike ===
In 1941, the newly-formed Canadian Congress of Labour (CCL) established the Office and Professional Workers Organizing Committee (OPWOC) after bank workers in Toronto and Montreal expressed interest in unionizing. Sufrin quit her job as an office worker and became a full-time organizer for OPWOC. Given the low wages and poor working conditions of bank employees, including unpaid overtime, penalties for cash shortages, and policies that required employees to seek management's permission before marrying, OPWOC membership grew quickly. Working with few resources and sharing a desk and phone with three men, Sufrin established seven locals in Toronto with approximately 1,000 members.

By November 1941, employees of the Banque Canadienne Nationale (BCN) in Montreal were officially chartered as OPWOC Local 5. Management responded by alleging the union had communist ties and intimidating employees, often transferring them to other branches or forcing them to quit. On April 30, 1942, BCN employees erected picket lines outside BCN branches, launching the first bank strike in Canadian history. The number of workers who participated in the strike is unclear because of starkly conflicting figures provided by the BCN and OPWOC, but the Ottawa Journal reported that 17 of BCN's 70 Montreal branches were forced to close while others were kept open by managers working alone.

Many of the strikers returned to work after the first week of the strike, though 39 remained on the picket lines. The strike officially ended on May 23 after BCN fired the remaining 39 strikers and the drive to unionize bank workers effectively collapsed.

=== United Steelworkers ===
After the BCN strike, Sufrin continued to work as a union organizer. In 1943, she began working for the United Steelworkers (USW) and helped organize 17,000 employees of the John Inglis plant in Toronto. During the year-long union drive, she focused her efforts on recruiting the 7,000 women who were employed there. The work was demanding; Sufrin would often wake up at 5:00 am to distribute leaflets to the early shift and then stay out past midnight distributing them to the swing shift.

The drive was successful but Sufrin, her weight having fallen to just 100 pounds, was left physically and mentally exhausted and she suffered what she described as a nervous breakdown. She was transferred to Vancouver later in 1943 where she spent the next three-and-a-half years fulfilling various administrative roles training union officers, managing finances, handling publicity, and editing a paper for the Vancouver Labor Council.

=== The Eaton Drive ===
In 1947, the CCL made the decision to attempt to organize employees at Eaton's, then known as the T. Eaton Company. At the time, Eaton's was Canada's largest department store and third-largest employer, behind the federal government and the railroads. It had 40,000 employees across Canada, including 13,000 in Toronto alone. The union specifically targeted the company's three Toronto locations given their proximity to labour's head offices.

The Eaton's local was named the Department Store Employees Union and Sufrin, on loan from the USW, was named director. In January 1948, Sufrin headed up a team of five and established a headquarters in a three-room office across the street from Eaton's mail-order warehouse. Her team included Lynn Williams, a union organizer who would later become president of the USW.

Over the next four years, Sufrin and her team employed a wide range of gimmicks to recruit new members and allay fears of strikes, ties to communism, and instant dismissal. They distributed leaflets outside stores on a weekly basis. They launched a weekly illustrated newspaper and a series of paid, five-minute radio programs. Activists were given small bags of peanuts with the slogan “Don't work for Peanuts” as conversation starters, while employees were handed white collars cut from white card that read “Don't Let it be a Yoke”. Members of other unions wearing badges that read “Union Pay Is Good – I Get It!” would hand out shopping bags imprinted “Join Local 1000” (the number assigned to the Eaton's local) to customers as they entered the store. Union activities also included a number of social events, including a bowling team, a Miss Local 1000 contest, and a float in the Labour Day Parade.

Sufrin's team faced a number of obstacles, often with the employees themselves. Eaton's employed a variety of workers with different needs. Sellers of higher end goods such as furs and good furniture tended to identify with the Eaton dynasty rather than with labour unions. Salesmen on commission tended to see themselves as entrepreneurs rather than employees. High turnover rates – as high as 20 to 30 per cent per year – also presented difficulties in retaining new members and, over the course of four years, the union lost roughly 3,000 members through attrition.

Other problems were more political in nature. In 1950, after 5,000 employees had signed membership applications, a revision to the Ontario Labour Relations Act required a $1 initiation fee with every application, meaning that organizers had to go back and attempt to collect it.

The union applied for certification in October 1950. Organizers had signed up approximately 6,000 of Eaton's 13,000 Toronto employees, above the 45 per cent threshold that would permit them to apply for certification, but well below the 55 per cent required for automatic certification. However, proceedings stalled for over a year. A vote was finally held in December 1951 and the union was defeated by a margin of 4,769 votes against and 3,967 in favour. Sufrin and her team continued to canvass Eaton's employees for another year, but they were unable to raise the support necessary for another vote.

While the campaign was ultimately unsuccessful, the pressure pushed Eaton's to improve employee wages and benefits. Over the course of four years, Eaton's had periodically granted wage increases totalling as much as $20 per week, nearly doubling some employees' salaries. Additionally, Eaton's introduced pension and health plans.

=== Later career ===
In 1952, Sufrin returned to the USW where she continued to organize white-collar workers and negotiate new contracts. From 1959 to 1964, Sufrin worked as an industrial relations officer with the Saskatchewan provincial government. She later took a job with the federal labour department researching the problems of women in the workplace.

== Personal life ==
Sufrin met her husband, Bernard “Bert” Sufrin (1916-1995), an economist and fellow CCF worker, while working at the Saskatchewan government finance office. They married in 1960 and moved to Ottawa in 1964 where Bert worked for the Labour Department of the Women's Bureau.

They retired to White Rock, British Columbia by 1972. Sufrin remained active with the NDP and founded the Surrey-White Rock branch of the Choice of Dying Society.

Sufrin died in White Rock on March 20, 1999, at the age of 86. Williams, who had been Sufrin's colleague during the Eaton's drive, wrote in The Globe and Mail:

To know Eileen was to know the true meaning of loyalty and friendship. She never failed to keep in touch. She practised what she believed every day of her life. One of her caregivers (during the last years of her life) was injured when she tripped over the leash while walking Eileen’s dog. No problem: Eileen provided workers’ compensation coverage.

== Legacy ==
In 1979, Sufrin was awarded the Governor General’s Medal, one of seven Canadian women honoured on the 50th anniversary of the Persons Case.

== Bibliography ==
- 1982 : The Eaton Drive: The Campaign to Organize Canada's Largest Department Store 1948 to 1952 by Eileen Sufrin.
