= Carolyn Sufrin =

American medical anthropologist and obstetrician-gynecologist

- Education: Amherst College (B.A.); Harvard University (M.A.); Johns Hopkins School of Medicine (M.D.); University of California, San Francisco and University of California, Berkeley (Ph.D.)
- Scientific career
- Fields: Reproductive health issues, clinical care in jail, gynecology and obstetrics
- Workplaces: University of California, San Francisco; Johns Hopkins University
- Thesis: Jailcare: The Safety Net of a U.S. Women's Jail (2014)
- Doctoral advisor: Vicanne Adams

Carolyn Beth Sufrin is an American medical anthropologist and obstetrician-gynecologist. She is an assistant professor of gynecology and obstetrics at Johns Hopkins University.

== Early life and education ==
Sufrin was born to Janice R. Sufrin, a research biochemist and Gerald Sufrin, a urologist. Her maternal grandparents, and several aunts and uncles are doctors. She started at Amherst College as a pre-medical major. She was influenced by an "Anthropology of Gender" course by Deborah Gewertz to pursue anthropology and medicine. Sufrin earned an undergraduate degree, summa cum laude, in anthropology and chemistry at Amherst College in 1997. She was awarded a Thomas J. Watson Fellowship to study "political activism and healthcare among Australian Aborigines." Sufrin wrote her Watson project while completing an M.A. in cultural anthropology at Harvard University between her final 2 years of medical school. She earned an M.D. from Johns Hopkins School of Medicine in 2003. Sufrin completed a residency at University of Pittsburgh Medical Center in obstetrics and gynecology in 2007. She completed a fellowship at UCSF School of Medicine in 2010. In 2014, Sufrin earned a Ph.D in medical anthropology at University of California, San Francisco and Berkeley. Vincanne Adams was her doctoral advisor.

== Career ==
Sufrin was an assistant professor in the department of obstetrics, gynecology, and reproductive sciences at UCSF and worked as an OB-GYN for a health clinic at San Francisco County Jails. She joined the faculty at Johns Hopkins in 2014 as an assistant professor of gynecology and obstetrics. She holds joint appointments in Bloomberg School of Public Health and the School of Medicine with departmental affiliations in the department of health, behavior, and society. She is the associate director of fellowship in family planning. She authored the 2017 book, Jailcare: Finding the Safety Net for Women Behind Bars. Her book examines reproductive justice, healthcare, and mass incarceration.

=== Research ===
Sufrin is experienced in the healthcare of incarcerated women and correctional medicine. She works on reproductive health issues, clinical care in jail, policy, and advocacy. Sufrin heads the Johns Hopkins initiative, Advocacy and Research on Reproductive Wellness of Incarcerated People. In March 2019, the Pregnancy in Prison Statistics (PIPS) study was released. It examined Federal Bureau of Prisons report data for 12-months between 2016 and 2018 and covered 57 percent of the female prison population. It is the "first national-scale systematic investigation of pregnancy frequencies and outcomes in prison. Its findings were published in the American Journal of Public Health.

== Awards and honors ==
Sufrin is a fellow of the American College of Obstetricians and Gynecologists and the Society for Family Planning.

== Personal life ==
Sufrin and Jacob Harold were married April 2012 at Annadel Estate Winery in Santa Rosa, California.

== Selected works ==
=== Books ===
- Sufrin, Carolyn (2017). Jailcare: Finding the Safety Net for Women behind Bars (1 ed.). University of California Press. JSTOR 10.1525/j.ctt1pd2kb3.
