= Patrice Gaines =

African-American writer (1949-)

- Born: 1949 (age 76–77); Quantico, Virginia
- Occupations: Author, public speaker

Patrice Gaines (born 1949) is a freelance journalist, author, and public speaker. After her incarceration at age 21 for heroin possession, Gaines became passionate about writing and systemic change to the prison industry.

== Biography ==
Patrice Gaines was born in Quantico, Virginia on a military base. She was the eldest of seven children born to a Marine and a homemaker. The family moved to South Carolina when Gaines was 10 years old, and they faced more racial discrimination and segregation than on the military base. Gaines developed feelings of self-doubt and insecurity.

Gaines became pregnant at 18 years old and had daughter Andrea. She began using heroin after the birth of her daughter, and went to jail for two years. After becoming a convicted felon, she "spiraled further down into near destruction before she decided to rebuild her life and discover her talent at, and passion for, writing." She attended community college and took secretarial and creative writing courses.

Gaines worked as a journalist of the Washington Post for 16 years. During an investigation into a 1985 murder case that sentenced eight young black men to prison, she left her position at Washington Post in 2001. Gaines raised doubts about the guilt of the men, and highlighted the systemic discrimination that leads to high rates of incarceration for minorities and the poor.

Gaines co-founded The Brown Angel Center with Gaile Dry-Burton, supporting women who have been incarcerated.

== Published works ==
- Gaines, P. (1994). Laughing in the dark : from colored girl to woman of color--a journey from prison to power (1st ed). Crown. ISBN 9780517594759
- Gaines, P. (1998). Moments of grace : meeting the challenge to change (First paperback edition). Three river Press. ISBN 9780609801710
- Hannah-Jones, N., Auslander, M., Blackistone, K. B., Boyd, H., Bundles, A. P., Carruthers, C. A., DeRamus, B., Edgar, C., Gaines, P., Hinds, A., Kadogo, A., Keymah, T., Latham, T. G., Madison, P. W., Malveaux, J., Matthews, T. M., Newkirk, V. R., Pitts, L., Reid, T., et al. (2020). The burden : African Americans and the enduring impact of slavery (R. Riley, Ed.; Paperback edition). Wayne State University Press. ISBN 9780814348314
- Bunn, C., Cottman, M. H., Gaines, P., Charles, N., Harriston, K., & Morial, M. H. (2021). Say their names : how Black lives came to matter in America (First edition). Grand Central Publishing. ISBN 9781538737828
