= Hodan Nalayeh Secondary School =

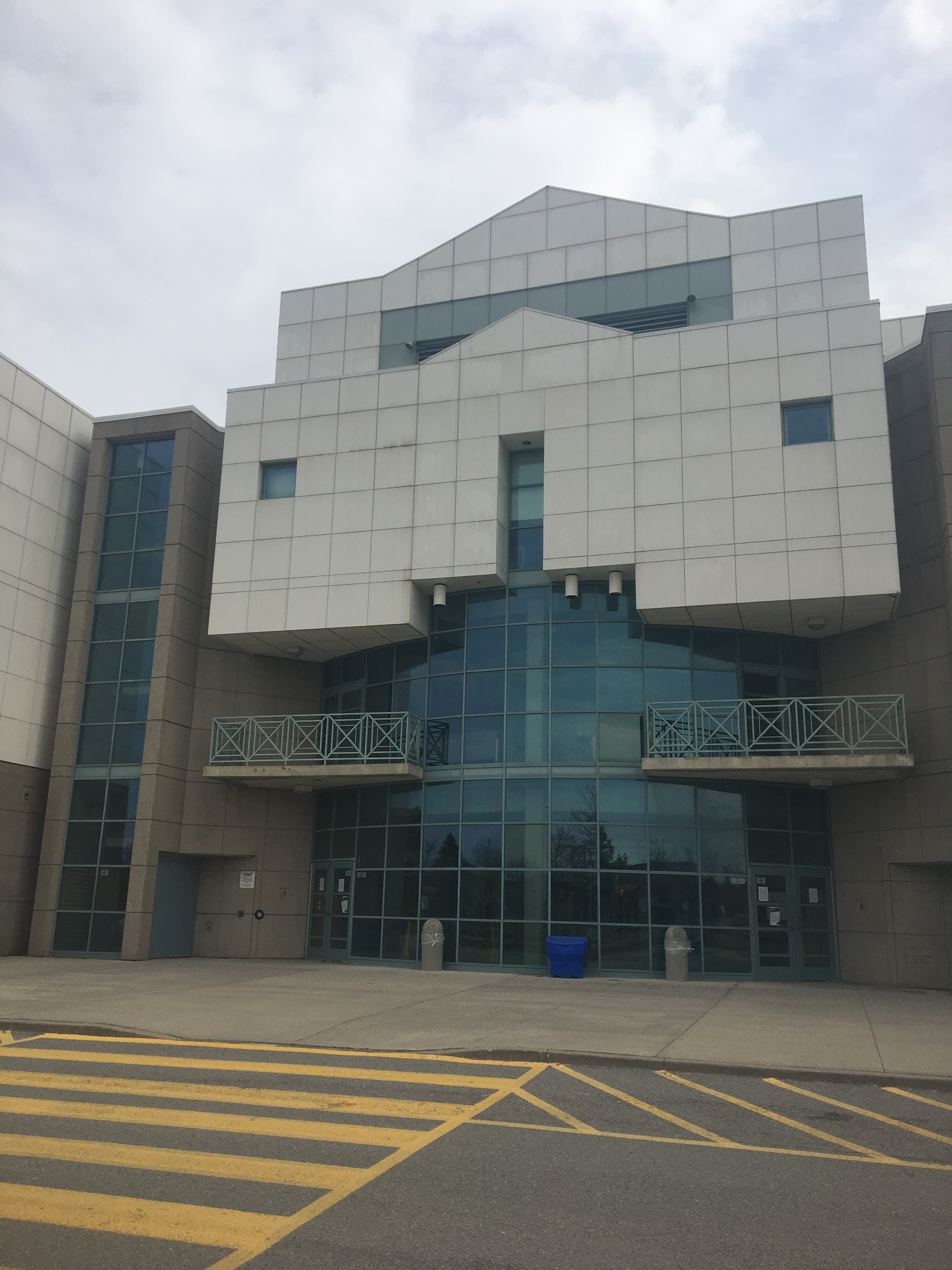

Location
- 1401 Clark Ave. West; Thornhill, Ontario, L4J 7R4; Canada; 43°47′50″N 79°28′07″W

Information
- Former names: Vaughan Secondary School (1989–2021)
- School type: Public high school
- Motto: Ficta Fiunt Res Gestae (Turning Dreams into Action)
- Founded: 1989
- School board: York Region District School Board (York Region Board of Education)
- Principal: Vincent Chow
- Grades: 9–12
- Language: English
- Area: Vaughan, Ontario
- Colours: Navy Blue and White
- Mascot: Nighthawks
- Team name: Nighthawks
- Website: www.yrdsb.ca/schools/hodannalayeh.ss/
- Last updated: December 2021

Hodan Nalayeh Secondary School, formerly Vaughan Secondary School, is a public secondary school in Vaughan, Ontario, Canada. It opened in 1989 by the York Region Board of Education and is currently overseen by the York Region District School Board.

The school was originally named after the City of Vaughan, which was named after Benjamin Vaughan. After complaints that Benjamin Vaughan had associations with slavery, the York Region District School Board renamed this school in honour of Hodan Nalayeh, a Somali-Canadian journalist. The school services a very diverse and multicultural community. Its motto is "Ficta Fiunt Res Gestae" (Turning dreams into action).

== History ==
Vaughan Secondary School was officially opened in 1989 by the York Region Board of Education and consists of three floors of classrooms and portables.

With district reorganization in 2006, a number of regions previously associated with Vaughan Secondary School were reassigned to Stephen Lewis Secondary School (Block 10). Students entering Grade 9 and 10 in 2006 residing in Block 10 were transferred from Vaughan Secondary School to Stephen Lewis Secondary School. This reorganization reduced Hodan Nalayeh Secondary School's student body from about 2,000 students to about 1,100 students.

In September 2020, the York Region District School Board voted to have the name Vaughan removed from its name for historical links to slavery. The school renaming comes after the murder of George Floyd months prior and had been named after the city in which it is located, which in turn was named after Benjamin Vaughan, a British Parliamentarian who owned Jamaican slaves and was once an opponent of abolitionism. As a result, the school was temporarily named "Secondary School".

In March 2021, the school was officially renamed to Hodan Nalayeh Secondary School after Somali-Canadian media executive Hodan Nalayeh, who was murdered in Somalia in 2019 in the Asasey Hotel attack.

== Academics ==
=== French immersion ===
Hodan Nalayeh Secondary School is one of six schools in the York District to offer a French immersion curriculum. Upon successful completion of the requisite French Immersion courses, students are eligible to receive a French Immersion Certificate.

=== Advanced Placement ===
Hodan Nalayeh Secondary School offers the Advanced Placement Program to its students. The school offers AP courses in Science (Chemistry, Biology and Physics), English, History and Math (Advanced functions, Calculus and Vectors). Like other AP programs, students who complete the Grade 12 AP courses are eligible to write the AP exam.

== Extracurricular activities ==
=== Radio station ===
Hodan Nalayeh Secondary School is home to 90.7 RAV-FM, one of the four licensed high school radio stations in Ontario and part of Hodan Nalayeh Secondary School's broadcasting course.

== Building ==
Architecturally, Hodan Nalayeh Secondary School has a modern exterior and interior design. The school consists of a three-storey building and portables. The building's first floor consists of the main lobby, principal stage, 2 gymnasiums, and the cafeteria. The second floor houses the library and the radio station.

== Notable alumni ==
- Nickeil Alexander-Walker, drafted 17th overall in the 2019 NBA draft by the New Orleans Pelicans
- Adam Hadwin, professional golfer
- Andrew Nembhard, drafted 31st overall in the 2022 NBA draft by the Indiana Pacers
- Ryan Nembhard, professional basketball player for the Dallas Mavericks
- Ben Silverman, professional golfer
- Andrew Wiggins, drafted 1st overall in the 2014 NBA draft by the Cleveland Cavaliers

== See also ==
- Education in Ontario
- List of secondary schools in Ontario
