= Andrew Wiggins =

Canadian basketball player (born 1995)

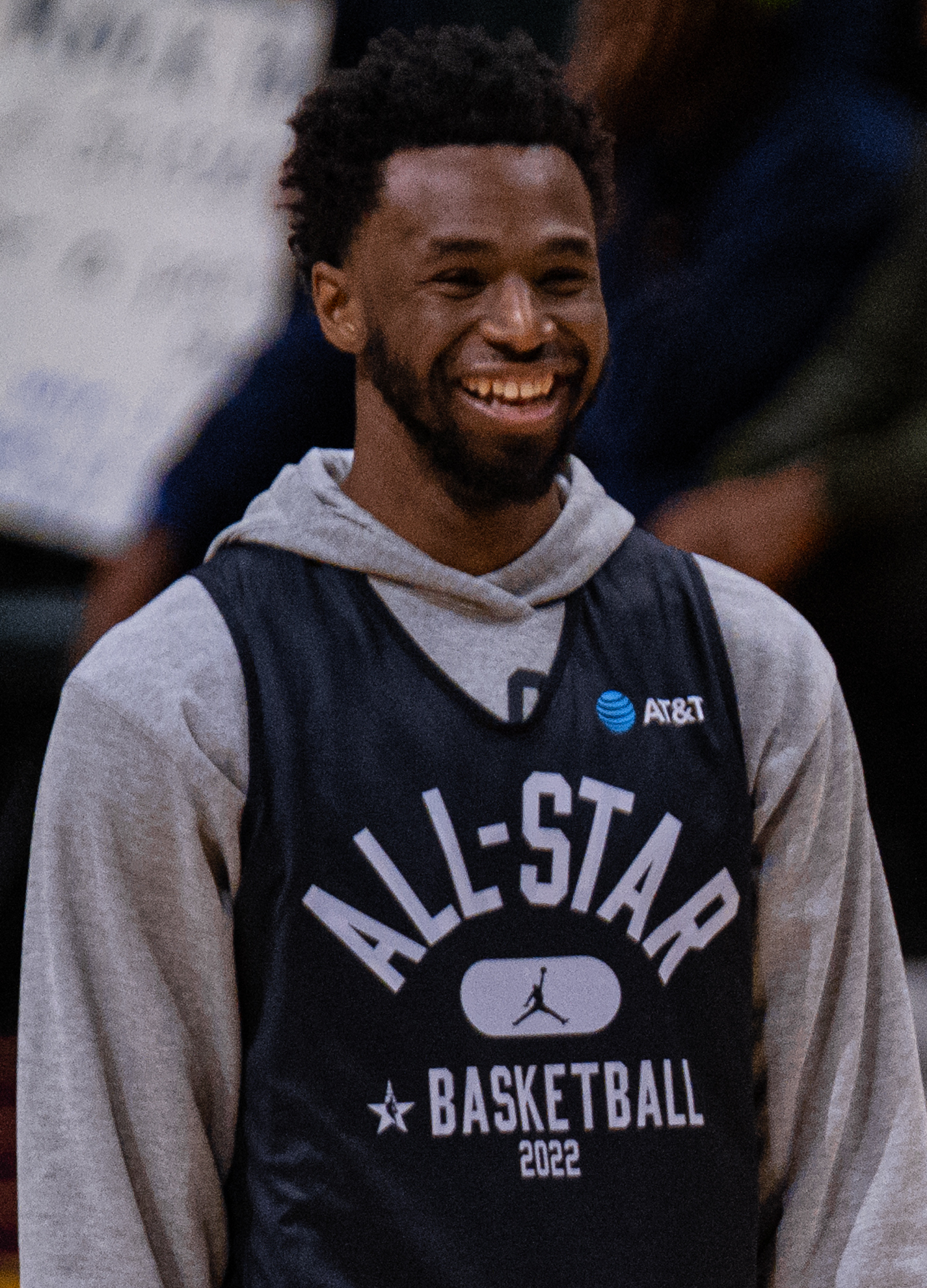
- Wiggins at the 2022 NBA All-Star Game

No. 22 – Miami Heat
- Position: Small forward
- League: NBA

Personal information
- Born: February 23, 1995 (age 31) Toronto, Ontario, Canada
- Listed height: 6 ft 6 in (1.98 m)
- Listed weight: 197 lb (89 kg)

Career information
- High school: Vaughan (Vaughan, Ontario); Huntington Prep (Huntington, West Virginia)
- College: Kansas (2013–2014)
- NBA draft: 2014: 1st round, 1st overall pick
- Drafted by: Cleveland Cavaliers
- Playing career: 2014–present

Career history
- 2014–2020: Minnesota Timberwolves
- 2020–2025: Golden State Warriors
- 2025–present: Miami Heat

Career highlights
- NBA champion (2022); NBA All-Star (2022); NBA Rookie of the Year (2015); NBA All-Rookie First Team (2015); Consensus second-team All-American (2014); First-team All-Big 12 (2014); Big 12 Freshman of the Year (2014); National high school player of the year (2013); McDonald's All-American (2013); First-team Parade All-American (2013)
- Stats at NBA.com
- Stats at Basketball Reference
Medals
Men's basketball
Representing Canada
FIBA AmeriCup
Bronze medal – third place	2015 Mexico City	National team
FIBA World U17 Cup
Bronze medal – third place	2010 Hamburg	National team
FIBA Americas U18 Championship
Bronze medal – third place	2012 São Sebastião do Paraíso	National team

Andrew Christian Wiggins (born February 23, 1995) is a Canadian professional basketball player for the Miami Heat of the National Basketball Association (NBA). He was selected with the first overall pick in the 2014 NBA draft by the Cleveland Cavaliers after one year of college basketball with the Kansas Jayhawks.

Wiggins grew up in Canada before attending his last two years of high school in the United States, where he was named a McDonald's All-American. At Kansas, he was named a second-team consensus All-American before becoming the second Canadian to be selected No. 1 overall in an NBA draft. After a preseason trade to the Minnesota Timberwolves, Wiggins earned NBA Rookie of the Year honors for the 2014–15 season. After five-and-a-half seasons with Minnesota, he was traded to Golden State in 2020. In 2022, Wiggins won his first NBA championship and was selected for his first NBA All-Star game, and was named a Western Conference starter. He has also been a member of the Canadian national team.

== Early life ==
Wiggins was born in Toronto, Ontario and raised in the nearby Vaughan portion of Thornhill, Ontario. He is the son of former NBA player Mitchell Wiggins, an American, and former Olympic track and field sprinter Marita Payne-Wiggins, a Canadian who is originally from Barbados. His parents met as student athletes at Florida State University. He attended elementary school at Glen Shields Public School, and high school at Vaughan Secondary School.

Wiggins began playing organized basketball when he was nine, joining an under-10 team in Toronto. At the time, he was 5 ft 7 in (1.70 m). He dunked a basketball for the first time when he was 13, and a year later, he grew to 6 ft 6 in (1.98 m) and shattered a glass backboard after dunking on a rim at the Dufferin Clark Community Centre in Vaughan.

== High school career ==
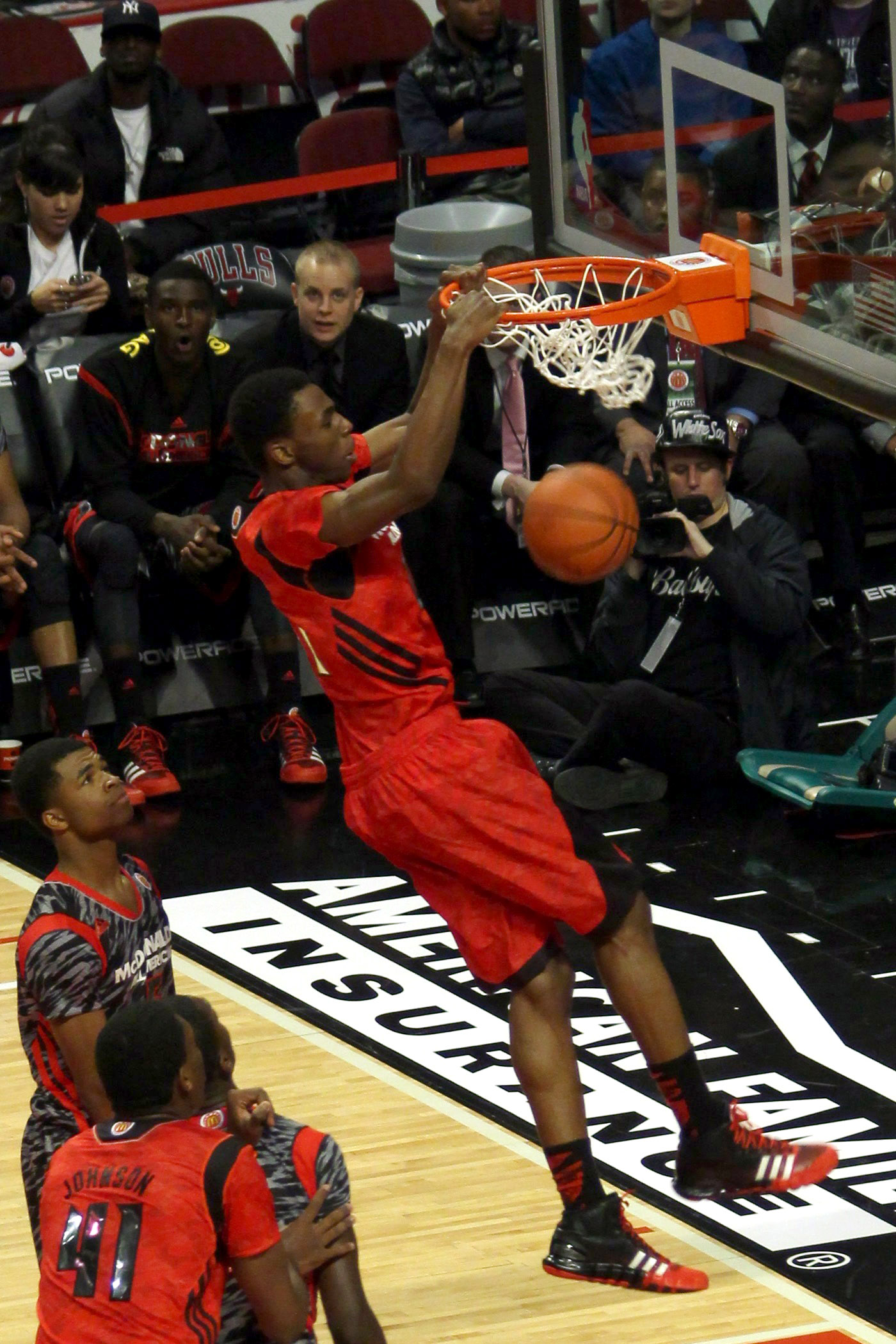
Wiggins dunking in the 2013 McDonald's All-American Boys Game

Wiggins attended Hodan Nalayeh Secondary School (formerly Vaughan Secondary School) in Vaughan for his first two years of high school. In his 2010–11 sophomore year, he led the school's AAAA basketball team to a 44–1 record, en route to winning the Ontario provincial championship. In the championship game, he scored 25 points and grabbed 13 rebounds, amid chants of "Over-rated!" from the crowd.

In 2011, he transferred to Huntington Prep School in Huntington, West Virginia. During his junior season, he averaged 24.2 points, 8.5 rebounds, 4.1 assists and 2.7 blocks per game. As a senior, he averaged 23.4 points, 11.2 rebounds, 2.6 blocks and 2.5 assists per game.

Wiggins had been rated as the top prospect for 2014, but announced in October 2012 that he would officially reclassify into his original high school class of 2013, after having repeated a grade in middle school. He needed just one remaining credit in English to graduate from Huntington Prep. He was immediately placed ahead of the previous number one prospect, Jabari Parker, by ESPN.

On February 7, 2013, after an article in Sports Illustrated criticized Canadian basketball and Wiggins' work ethic, he responded later that day, scoring 57 points in a 111–59 win over Marietta College.

Wiggins was named the 2013 Naismith Prep Player of the Year on February 25. He was named the 2013 Gatorade National Player of the Year on March 28 as the nation's top high school player. He was the first Canadian player to be so named. In May 2013, he was named Mr. Basketball USA. He was ranked number one high school basketball player by SLAM magazine.

In April 2013, Wiggins played in the Jordan Brand Classic All-American game in Brooklyn. He scored 19 points and tied Julius Randle for lead scorer for the East team.

College recruiting
Name	Hometown	School	Height	Weight	Commit date
Andrew Wiggins; SF	Vaughan, ON	Vaughan Secondary / Huntington Prep	6 ft 7 in (2.01 m)	190 lb (86 kg)	May 14, 2013
Andrew Wiggins; SF	Recruit ratings: Scout: Rivals: 247Sports: (97)				
Overall recruit ranking: Scout: 1 (SF); 1 (national); 2 (school) Rivals: 1 (SF); 1 (national)
Note: In many cases, Scout, Rivals, 247Sports, On3, and ESPN may conflict in their listings of height and weight.; In these cases, the average was taken. ESPN grades are on a 100-point scale.; Sources: "2013 Kansas Basketball Commitment List". Rivals. Archived from the original on February 28, 2017.; "2013 Kansas College Basketball Team Recruiting Prospects". Scout. Archived from the original on February 28, 2017.; "Kansas Jayhawks 2013 Player Commits". ESPN. Archived from the original on February 28, 2017.; "Scout.com Team Recruiting Rankings". Scout.; "2013 Team Ranking". Rivals.

== College career ==
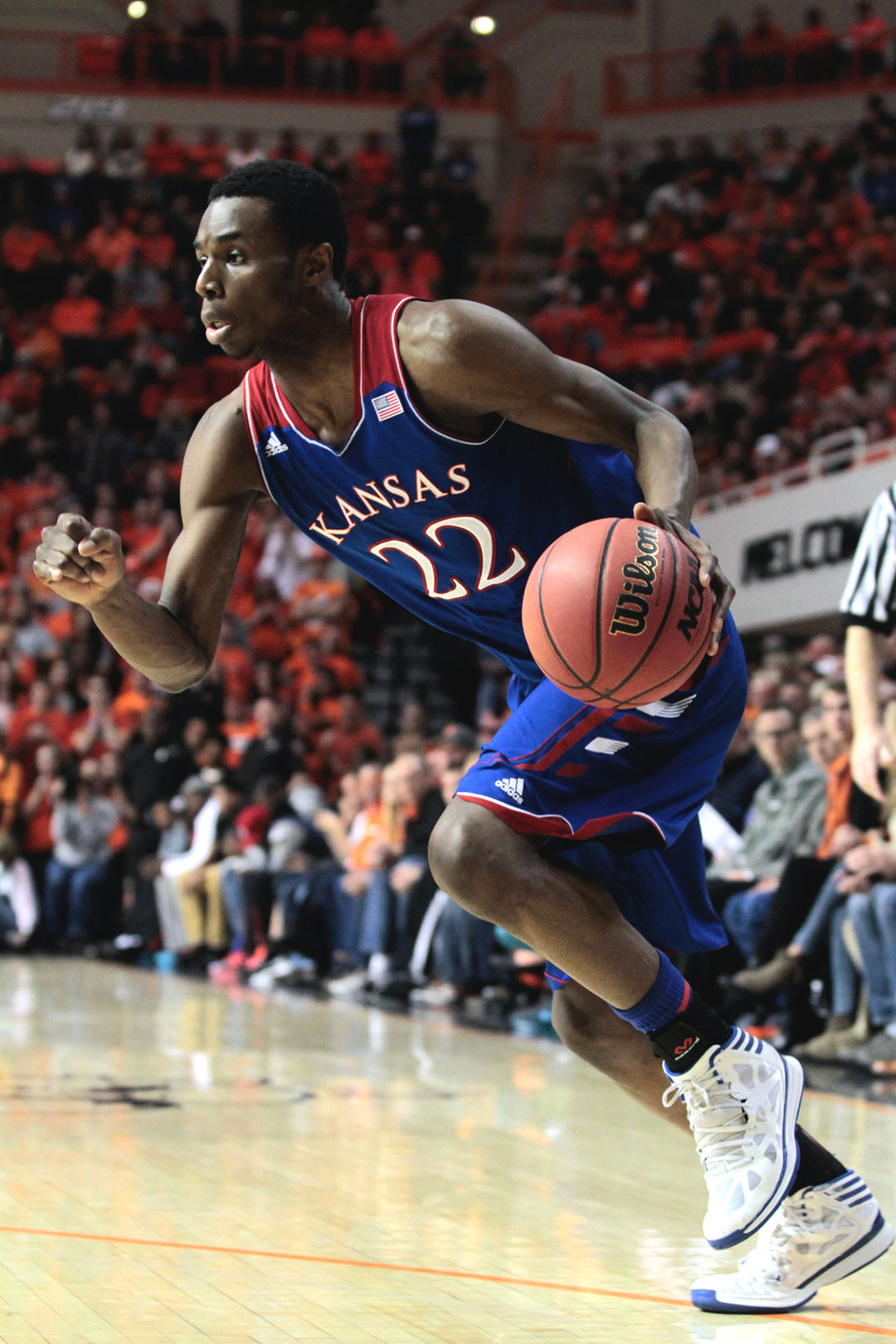
Wiggins playing for Kansas in 2014

Wiggins committed to Kansas on May 14, 2013. Before the announcement, he had narrowed his choices to Florida State, Kentucky, Kansas and North Carolina. Wiggins joined the Kansas team on June 19, 2013.

On January 13, 2014, Wiggins scored 17 points and collected 19 rebounds in a 77–70 victory over Iowa State, becoming only the second freshman in the last 15 years (along with Michael Kidd-Gilchrist) to amass those numbers in a win against a ranked opponent.

Wiggins averaged 17.1 points per game (ppg), 5.9 rebounds per game (rpg), and made 34.1% of his three-point field goals in his freshman year at Kansas. On January 22, 2014, Wiggins was named a Top 25 Finalist for the John R. Wooden Men's Player of the Year award by the Los Angeles Athletic Club. On February 28, he was named one of the 10 semi-finalists for Naismith College Player of the Year.

On March 8, 2014, Wiggins scored 41 points against West Virginia, the most for a Big 12 Conference freshman since Michael Beasley scored 44 points against Baylor in 2008.

== Professional career ==
=== Minnesota Timberwolves (2014–2020) ===
==== Rookie of the Year (2014–2015) ====
Wiggins declared for the 2014 NBA draft on March 31, 2014. He was selected first overall in the draft by the Cleveland Cavaliers on June 26, 2014, becoming the second Canadian picked number one in the draft, after Anthony Bennett, who had been selected first overall one year prior in the 2013 NBA draft, also by Cleveland. On August 23, a three-team trade was completed involving the Cavaliers, the Minnesota Timberwolves and the Philadelphia 76ers. As part of the deal, Wiggins and Bennett were traded to the Wolves, along with Thaddeus Young, then of the Sixers. The Cavaliers received Kevin Love from Minnesota, while the Sixers received Luc Mbah a Moute and Alexey Shved from Minnesota and a 2015 first-round draft pick from Cleveland. Wiggins became just the second player since the ABA–NBA merger to be drafted as the number one pick, only to be traded afterwards without playing a single game for the team he was originally selected for; Chris Webber was the first following the 1993 draft.

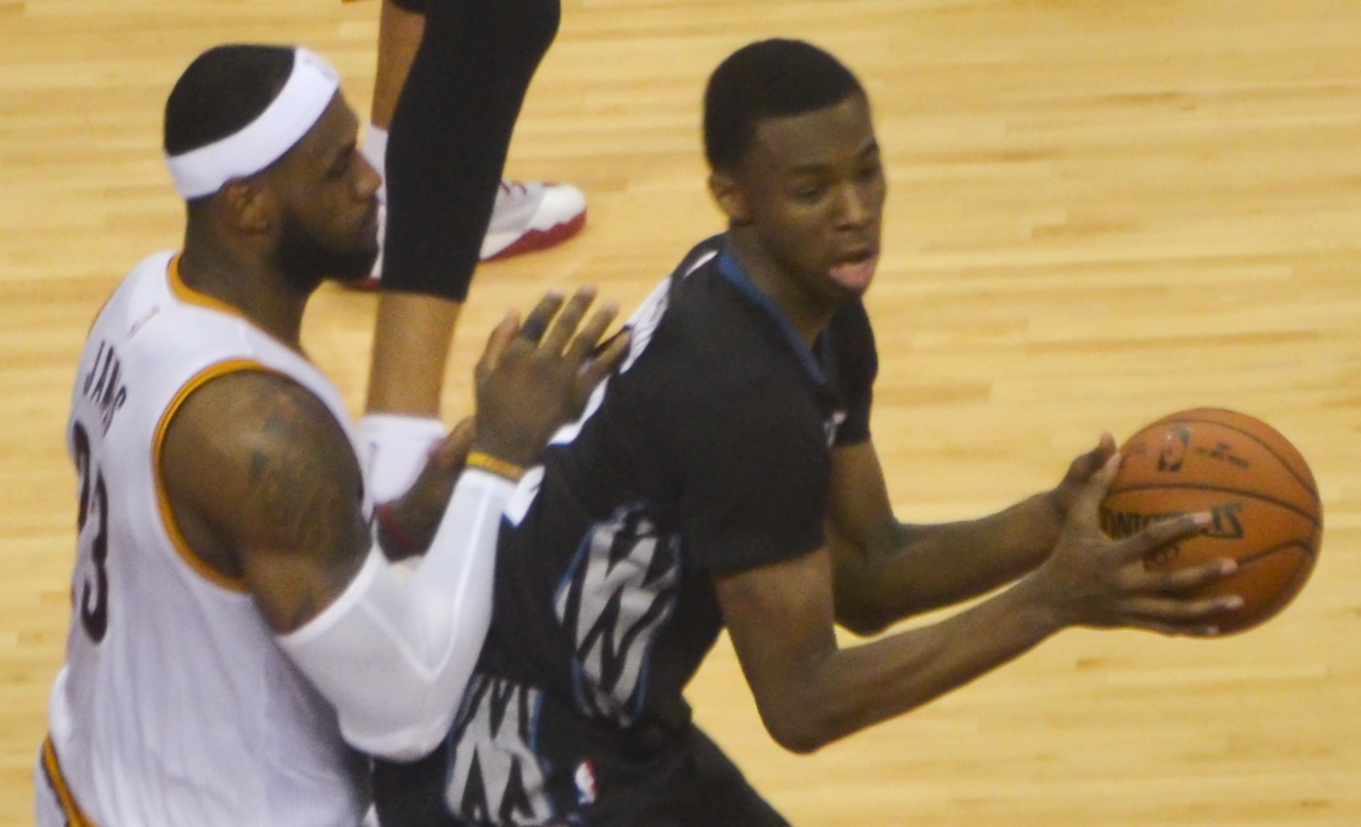
LeBron James guarding Wiggins in his rookie season with the Timberwolves, December 2014

In his NBA debut on October 29, 2014, Wiggins scored six points in a 105–101 season-opening loss to the Memphis Grizzlies. He went on to earn Rookie of the Month honours in the Western Conference for the first two months of the season. On January 31, he scored 33 points in a loss to the Cavaliers. On February 13, Wiggins won the Rising Stars Challenge MVP after scoring 22 points for Team World in a 121–112 win over Team USA. On April 30, he was named the NBA Rookie of the Year for the 2014–15 season.

==== Career highs in scoring (2015–2017) ====
On November 7, 2015, Wiggins scored a game-high 31 points in a 102–93 overtime win over the Chicago Bulls. Two days later, he tied his career high with 33 points in a 117–107 win over the Atlanta Hawks, thus recording consecutive 30-point games for the first time in his career. On December 18, he recorded 32 points, 10 rebounds and six assists in a 99–95 win over the Sacramento Kings, joining LeBron James, Kevin Durant and Tobias Harris as the only players 20 or younger to record at least 30 points, 10 boards and five assists in a game since 2000. On January 8, 2016, he scored a then career-high 35 points in a loss to the Cleveland Cavaliers.

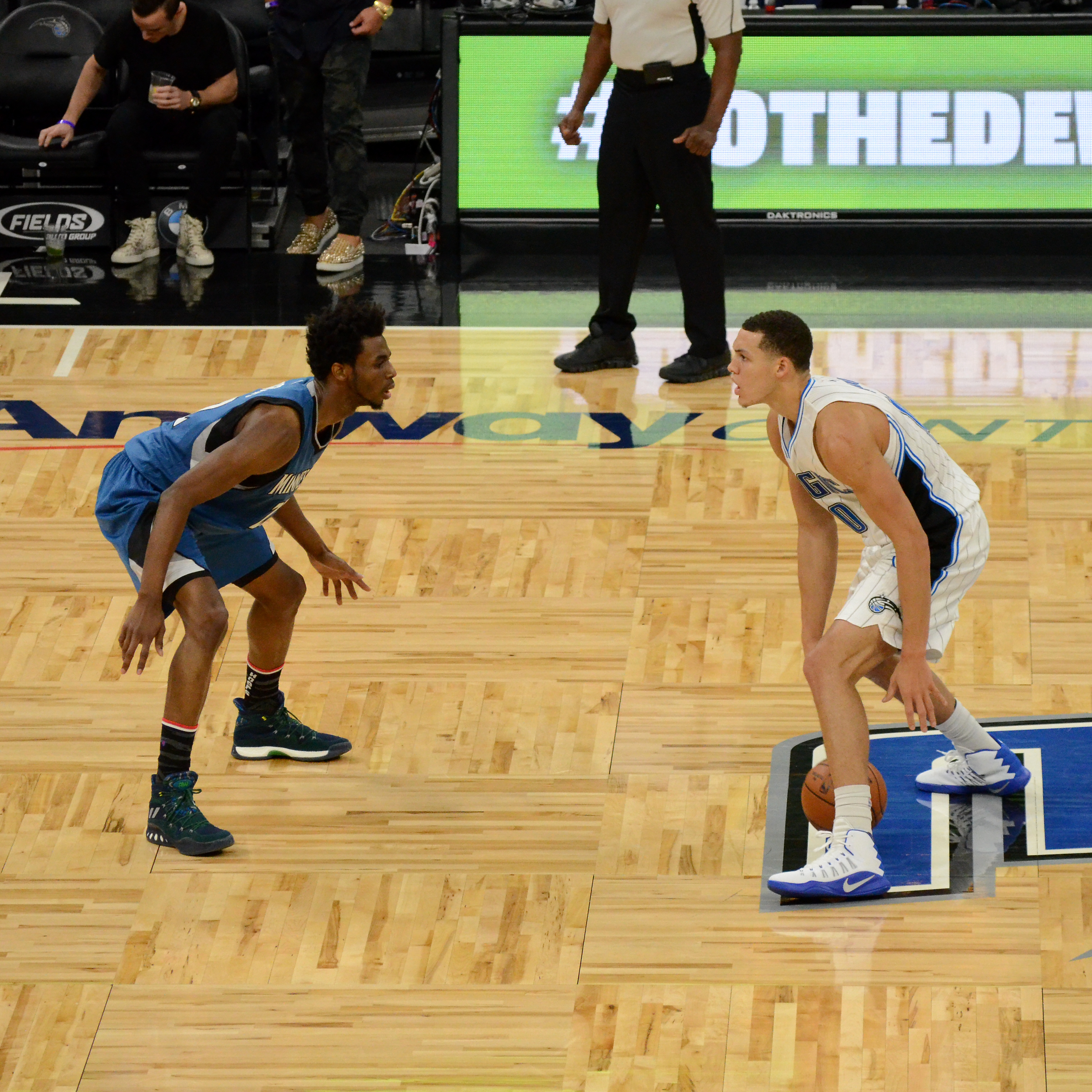
Wiggins guarding Aaron Gordon during a game in November 2016

On November 8, 2016, Wiggins scored a career-high 36 points and hit a career-best six three-pointers in a 119–110 loss to the Brooklyn Nets. Five days later, he set a new career high with 47 points in a 125–99 win over the Los Angeles Lakers, becoming the first Canadian-born player to score 40-plus points in an NBA game. On February 14, he had a 41-point effort in a 116–108 loss to the Cleveland Cavaliers. The following day, he scored 40 points in a 112–99 win over the Denver Nuggets, becoming just the second Minnesota player to record back-to-back 40-point games. On February 24, he scored 27 points in a 97–84 win over the Dallas Mavericks, topping 20 points for the 16th straight game, tying a franchise record.

==== First playoff appearance (2017–2020) ====
On October 11, 2017, Wiggins signed a five-year, $148 million contract extension with the Timberwolves. On October 22, he scored 27 points and hit the game-winning, buzzer-beating three-pointer to lift the Timberwolves to a 115–113 win over the Oklahoma City Thunder. On January 20, 2018, he scored 22 of his season-high 29 points in the first half of the Timberwolves' 115–109 win over the Toronto Raptors. Two days later, he set a new season high with 40 points in a 126–118 win over the Los Angeles Clippers. On February 7, 2018, in a 140–138 overtime loss to the Cleveland Cavaliers, Wiggins reached 6,000 career points. At 22 years, 349 days, he became the sixth-youngest player to reach the plateau. By the end of the season, Wiggins finished with a scoring average of 17.7 PPG, his lowest since his rookie year.

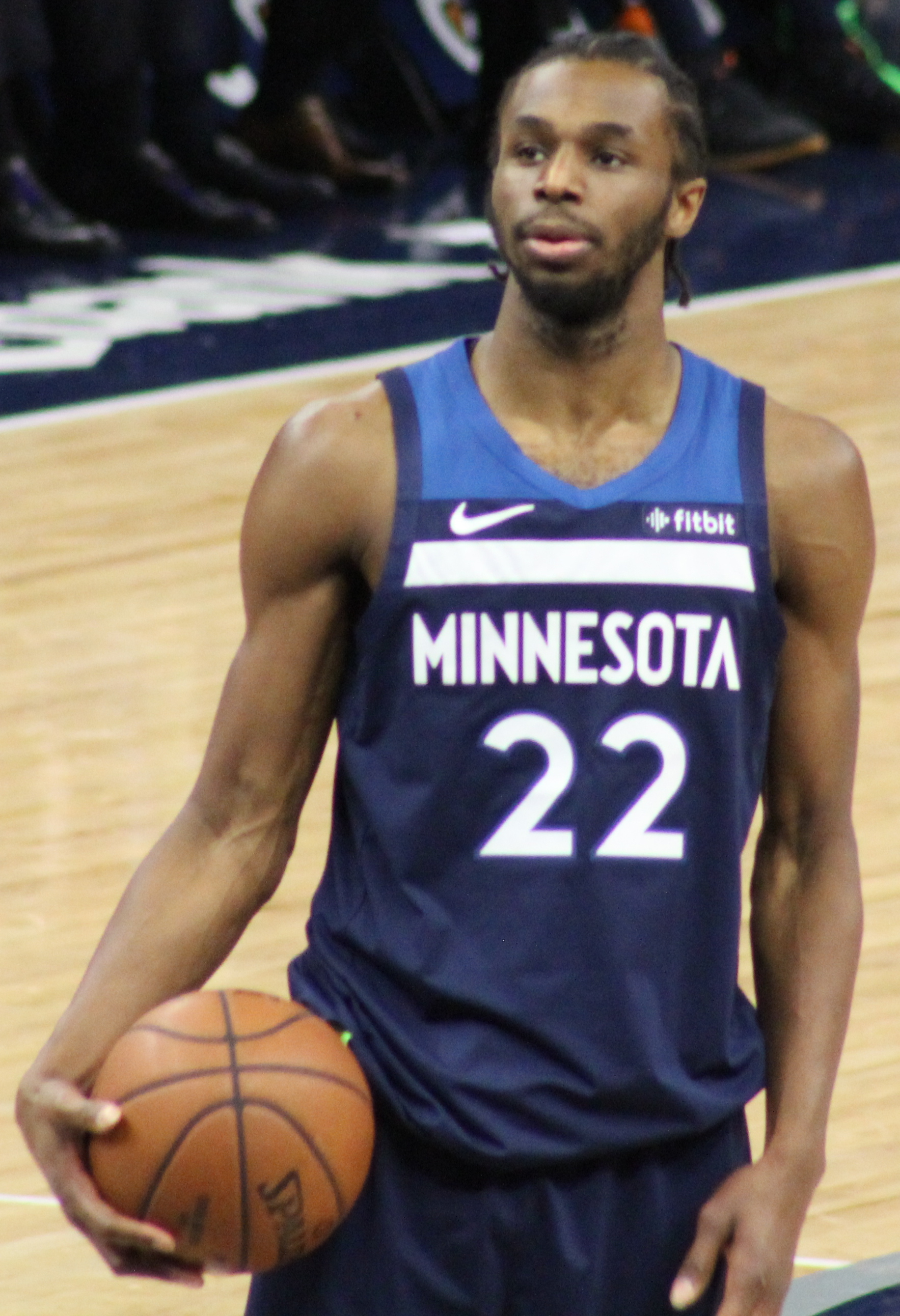
Wiggins in 2019

On October 24, 2018, Wiggins was inactive for only the second time in his career, sitting out the Timberwolves' loss to the Toronto Raptors because of a bruised right quadriceps. The last time Wiggins was inactive was November 10, 2015, when he sat out a loss to the Charlotte Hornets because of a sore right knee. Wiggins returned to action on October 31 against the Utah Jazz after missing three games. He struggled early in the season, culminating in an 0-for-12 shooting night on November 24 against the Chicago Bulls. It was the first time in his career he finished a game scoreless. On December 23, he scored 30 points and hit the go-ahead layup with 14 seconds remaining to help the Timberwolves defeat the Oklahoma City Thunder 114–112. He topped that total with 31 points on January 2 against the Boston Celtics. On January 6, he scored 25 of his 28 points in the first half of the Timberwolves' 108–86 win over the Los Angeles Lakers. Two days later, he had a season-high 40 points and 10 rebounds in a 119–117 win over the Thunder. On January 18 against the San Antonio Spurs, Wiggins passed Sam Mitchell (7,161) for second place on the franchise's career scoring list. On January 27, he scored a game-high 35 points in a 125–111 loss to the Jazz.

On January 18, 2020, Wiggins achieved his first career triple-double with 18 points, 10 rebounds and a career-high 11 assists.

=== Golden State Warriors (2020–2025) ===
==== First year in Golden State and play-in appearance (2020–2021) ====
On February 6, 2020, Wiggins and two draft picks were traded to the Golden State Warriors in exchange for Jacob Evans, D'Angelo Russell and Omari Spellman. Wiggins scored 24 points and had five steals in his debut for the Warriors, in a 125–120 loss to the Los Angeles Lakers. The Warriors failed to qualify for the playoffs and finished with a 15–50 record, the worst in the league.

On March 19, 2021, Wiggins scored a season-high 40 points, alongside eight rebounds, four assists and four steals, in a 116–103 win over the Memphis Grizzlies. The Warriors qualified for the newly implemented play-in tournament; however, they suffered two straight losses to the Los Angeles Lakers and Memphis Grizzlies, failing to reach the postseason for the second straight season despite a 22-point, 10-rebound double-double from Wiggins in their loss to the Grizzlies.

==== First All-Star selection and NBA championship (2021–2022) ====
On December 6, 2021, Wiggins scored 28 points on a career-high eight threes made, in a 126–95 win over the Orlando Magic. On January 27, 2022, he was named a Western Conference starter for the 2022 NBA All-Star Game, his first All-Star selection. He received support in the form of fan voting points from K-pop star, BamBam, who provided a strategic social media boost. He was the third first-time All-Star to be voted a starter in his eighth season or later. (Note: The first two were Bob Boozer (eighth season, 1968) and Kyle Lowry (ninth, 2015)) Wiggins also became the first No. 1 overall draft pick in the modern draft era (since 1966) to earn his first All-Star selection in his eighth season or later. On May 22, during Game 3 of the Western Conference Finals, Wiggins scored a playoff career-high 27 points and tied his then-playoff career high with 11 rebounds in a 109–100 Game 3 win over the Dallas Mavericks.

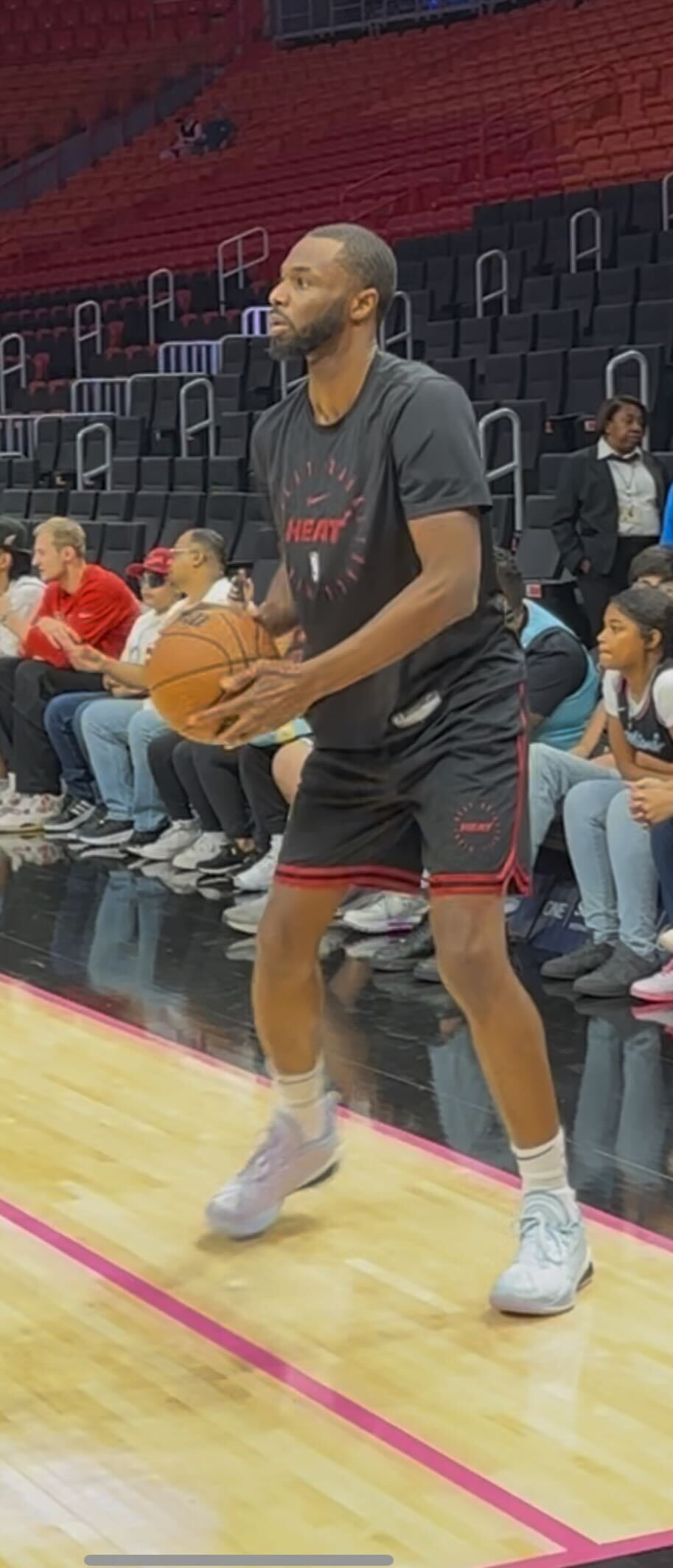
Andrew Wiggins warming up with the Heat during the 2024-25 season.

In Game 4 of the NBA Finals, Wiggins posted a 17-point, 16-rebound (a playoff career high) double-double in a 107–97 win over the Boston Celtics. In Game 5, he logged a 26-point, 13-rebound double-double in a 104–94 win. Wiggins won his first NBA championship after the Warriors defeated the Celtics in six games. He finished the NBA Finals as the leading rebounder, blocker and second highest scorer for the Warriors after averaging 18.3 points, 8.8 rebounds and 1.5 blocks per game, along with playing stifling defense on Boston All-NBA forward Jayson Tatum.

==== Contract extension (2022–2025) ====
On October 15, 2022, Wiggins signed a four-year contract extension worth $109 million with the Warriors. On November 20, Wiggins scored 22 points on 6-of-11 shooting from three-point range. Wiggins, Stephen Curry and Klay Thompson combined for 23 made three-pointers, the most three-pointers made in a game by a trio in NBA history. On December 3, Wiggins scored a season-best 36 points and matched his career high with 8-of-10 shooting from three-point range in a 120–103 win over the Houston Rockets. In the 2023 NBA playoffs, the Warriors were eliminated in the Conference Semifinals by the Los Angeles Lakers. On March 24, 2024, Wiggins became the first NBA player born in Canada to reach 1,000 career threes made.

=== Miami Heat (2025–present) ===
On February 6, 2025, Wiggins was traded to the Miami Heat in a five-team trade, which included Jimmy Butler going to the Warriors. On March 23, Wiggins had the second-highest scoring game of his career with 42 points in a 122–105 win over the Charlotte Hornets.

On November 10, 2025, Wiggins scored 23 points, grabbed 4 rebounds, and delivered 4 assists in the Heat's overtime win against the Cleveland Cavaliers, including the game-winning alley-oop dunk at the buzzer to secure a 140–138 victory.

On June 29, 2026, Wiggins opted into the final year of his contract and signed a two-year, $34 million extension with the Heat, essentially making it a three-year, $64 million contract.

== National team career ==
Wiggins participated in the 2010 FIBA Under-17 World Championship and 2012 FIBA Americas Under-18 Championship, helping the Canadian junior national team win a bronze medal in each tournament. During the 2010 tournament, Wiggins was a teammate of Anthony Bennett, the number one overall pick in the 2013 NBA draft and his former teammate on the Timberwolves. In the 2012 tournament, he led the team in scoring with 15.2 ppg, along with 7.6 rpg.

On August 20, 2015, Wiggins was named to the Canadian national team roster for the 2015 FIBA Americas Championship, a qualifying tournament for the 2016 Summer Olympics. Wiggins helped Canada win the bronze medal; he led the team in scoring, with 15.1 points per game, and he was named to the All-Tournament Team.

Wiggins rejoined the team for the 2020 FIBA Men's Olympic Qualifying Tournament, averaging 21.7 points, 6.0 rebounds and 2.3 assists per game in three contests.

== Career statistics ==
Legend
GP	Games played	GS	Games started	MPG	Minutes per game
FG%	Field goal percentage	3P%	3-point field goal percentage	FT%	Free throw percentage
RPG	Rebounds per game	APG	Assists per game	SPG	Steals per game
BPG	Blocks per game	PPG	Points per game	**Bold**	Career high
†	Won an NBA championship	*	Led the league

=== NBA ===
==== Regular season ====
Year	Team	GP	GS	MPG	FG%	3P%	FT%	RPG	APG	SPG	BPG	PPG
2014–15	Minnesota	**82**	**82***	36.2	.437	.310	.760	4.6	2.1	1.0	.6	16.9
2015–16	Minnesota	81	81	35.1	.459	.300	.761	3.6	2.0	1.0	.6	20.7
2016–17	Minnesota	**82***	**82***	**37.2**	.452	.356	.760	4.0	2.3	1.0	.4	**23.6**
2017–18	Minnesota	**82***	**82***	36.3	.438	.331	.643	4.4	2.0	1.1	.6	17.7
2018–19	Minnesota	73	73	34.8	.412	.339	.699	4.8	2.5	1.0	.7	18.1
2019–20	Minnesota	42	42	34.7	.444	.331	.720	**5.2**	**3.7**	.7	.9	22.4
2019–20	Golden State	12	12	33.6	.457	.339	.672	4.6	3.6	**1.3**	**1.4**	19.4
2020–21	Golden State	71	71	33.3	**.477**	.380	.714	4.9	2.4	.9	1.0	18.6
2021–22†	Golden State	73	73	31.9	.466	.393	.634	4.5	2.2	1.0	.7	17.2
2022–23	Golden State	37	37	32.2	.473	.396	.611	5.0	2.3	1.2	.8	17.1
2023–24	Golden State	71	59	27.0	.453	.358	.751	4.5	1.7	.6	.6	13.2
2024–25	Golden State	43	43	30.1	.444	.379	.777	4.6	2.4	.9	.8	17.6
2024–25	Miami	17	17	32.1	.458	.360	.731	4.2	3.3	1.2	1.0	19.0
2025–26	Miami	68	68	30.3	.475	**.414**	**.784**	4.8	2.7	1.1	1.0	15.4
Career		834	822	33.5	.451	.362	.728	4.5	2.3	1.0	.7	18.2
All-Star		1	1	15.3	.571	.500	—	.0	1.0	.0	.0	10.0

==== Playoffs ====
Year	Team	GP	GS	MPG	FG%	3P%	FT%	RPG	APG	SPG	BPG	PPG
2018	Minnesota	5	5	32.8	.441	.333	.600	5.2	2.0	.4	.4	15.8
2022†	Golden State	**22**	**22**	**34.9**	**.469**	.333	.646	**7.5**	1.8	**1.0**	1.0	16.5
2023	Golden State	13	12	34.0	.459	.297	.681	5.6	1.9	.8	1.2	**16.7**
2025	Miami	4	4	30.5	.372	**.350**	**.700**	3.3	**2.3**	.3	**1.3**	11.5
Career		44	43	34.0	.456	.324	.655	6.3	1.9	.8	1.0	16.0

=== College ===
Year	Team	GP	GS	MPG	FG%	3P%	FT%	RPG	APG	SPG	BPG	PPG
2013–14	Kansas	35	35	32.8	.448	.341	.775	5.9	1.5	1.2	1.0	17.1

== Personal life ==
Wiggins has two children named Amyah and Alayah.

Wiggins has five siblings: sisters Stephanie, Angelica and Taya; and brothers Nick and Mitchell Jr. His middle brother, Nick, played college basketball at Vincennes University, Wabash Valley College and Wichita State University, and his oldest brother, Mitchell Jr., played at Hillsborough Community College and Southeastern University.

== See also ==
- List of Canadians in the NBA
- List of second-generation NBA players
