= Gewirtz =

Gewirtz West Ashkenazi Jewish Yiddish surname געווירץ variously spelled Gevirtz/Gevirts/Gewertz literally meaning "spice". Notable people with the surname include:

- David Gewirtz, American journalist
- Howard Gewirtz, American television writer
- Paul Gewirtz, American legal scholar
- Russell Gewirtz, American screenwriter
- The Gewirtz graph, named after American mathematician Allan Gewirtz

== See also ==
- Gvirtz
