= Gerald Sufrin =

American physician

Gerald Sufrin is an American urologist. He is a professor in the department of urology at University at Buffalo School of Medicine and Biomedical Sciences. He was the president of the American Association of Genitourinary Surgeons from April 15, 2015, to April 14, 2016. In 2017, he received the Lifetime Achievement Award from the American Urological Association. He is the father of Carolyn Sufrin.
