= Elifelet (organization) =

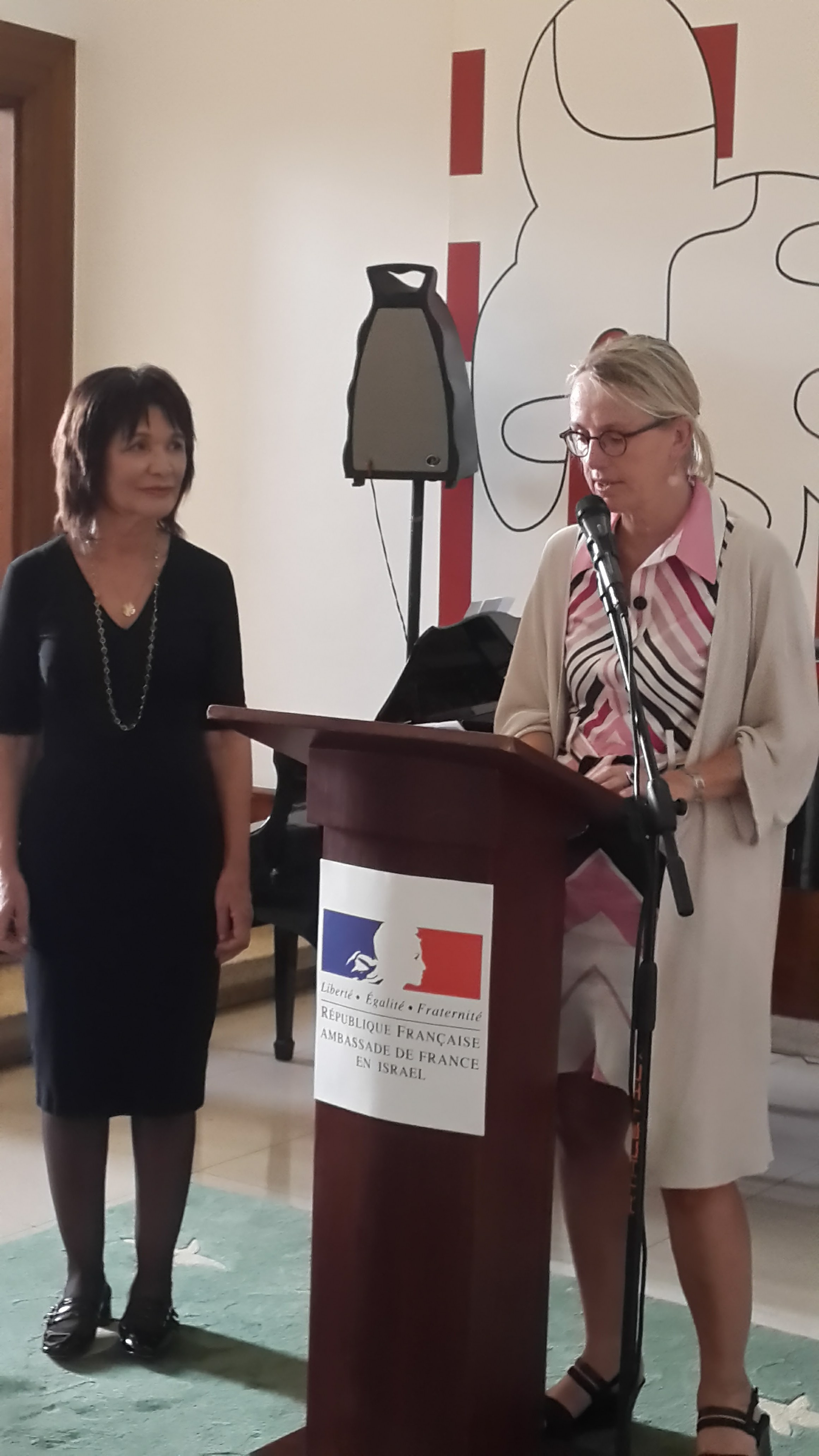
French Ambassador to Israel presents a commendation within the framework of the Human Rights Prize of the French Republic, to Yael Gvirtz

Elifelet - Citizens for Refugee Children (Hebrew: אליפלט - אזרחים למען ילדי פליטים) is a non-profit non-governmental educational and aid organization headquartered in Tel Aviv-Yafo which works to assist the youth and children of migrant workers, refugees, and foreign nationals in Israel, founded in 2013. Its founder is journalist and social activist Yael Gvirtz.

It was named after the poem "Elifelet" by Nathan Alterman.

== Controversies ==
In 2016 Israeli Minister of Defense Avigdor Liberman ordered Israeli military not to take part in the activities that assist migrants, after Channel 10 reported that some soldiers were volunteering for Elifelet. Orthodox rabbi Eli Ben-Dahan supported this decision: "Israeli soldiers should volunteer for programs that benefit Israeli citizens".

== Recognition ==
- 2015: President's Volunteer Award
- 2015: Yigal Alon Award
- 2017: a commendation in the framework of the Human Rights Prize of the French Republic
- 2017: a commendation during the Dror Prize for Social Change ceremony.
