= Deborah Gewertz =

American anthropologist

Deborah B. Gewertz (born 1948) is an American anthropologist. She is the G. Henry Whitcomb 1874 Professor of Anthropology at Amherst College. Gewertz is a fellow of the Association for Cultural Anthropology and the Association for Social Anthropology in Oceania. Gewertz completed a B.A. in English literature, cum laude at Queens College, City University of New York in 1969. She was a special student at Princeton University from 1968 to 1969. Gewertz earned a Ph.D. in anthropology from the Graduate Center, CUNY in 1977.
