= John Vaughan (wine merchant) =

American wine merchant (1756-1841)

- Portrait by Thomas Sully, c. 1823
- Born: 15 January 1756; London
- Died: 30 December 1841 (aged 85); Philosophical Hall
- Parent(s): Samuel Vaughan; Sarah Hallowell

John Vaughan (15 January 1756 – 30 December 1841) was a wine merchant, philanthropist, and long-time treasurer and librarian of the American Philosophical Society. He was born in England and moved to Philadelphia in 1782, becoming a respected citizen of the city, and working for literary, scientific and benevolent causes. During five decades of service to the Society, Vaughan was instrumental in building its library collection and introducing many scientists and historians to each other through his letters and Sunday breakfasts.

== Life ==
John Vaughan was born in London on 15 January 1756, one of ten surviving children of Samuel Frier Vaughan, a London merchant banker and West India planter, and Sarah Hallowell, daughter of Benjamin Hallowell, a Boston merchant and founder of Hallowell, Maine. The family were liberals who attended the Presbyterian, later Unitarian, Gravel Pit Chapel, Hackney, where the dissenting minister and political radical Richard Price preached.

As with his four brothers Benjamin Vaughan, Vaughan attended Warrington Academy, 1772-1774. In preparation for a mercantile career, John Vaughan was sent abroad, first to Jamaica (1776), and then to France (1778), where he worked for a merchant house in Bordeaux, and met Benjamin Franklin. In 1778, following the signing of the Treaty of Amity and Commerce, Vaughan, who, as a British subject, was faced with possible arrest or deportation, declared himself an American. However, he was unable to procure a certificate to that effect, and resided in Spain for a while before removing to the United States in 1782. Vaughan settled in Philadelphia, where he became a prosperous wine merchant, with warehouse and offices at 109 & 111, South Front Street, in the commercial quarter.

Vaughan became a member of the American Philosophical Society, 16 January 1784, and subsequently dedicated much of his energy and resources to the Society. He became a member, 16 January 1784, its treasurer in 1791, and librarian in 1803, serving in these posts until his death. Vaughan kept the society's books and accounts, and oversaw its publications. In 1824 he compiled a catalogue for the library which he hoped would one day become a national library. In 1795, he subscribed towards the proposed western expedition of the French botanist André Michaux. Though not a scholar himself, Vaughan encouraged and supported the work of scholars, especially those interested in Native American linguistics and ethno-history. He remained a close friend of the Portuguese botanist and geologist José Francisco Correia da Serra, who lived in Philadelphia from 1812 and 1820 and who served for the latter half of this time as ambassador to the United States from Portugal.

Vaughan contributed generously to the construction of Philosophical Hall, in which he established his offices, whose cellars he rented for the storage of his wines and spirits, and where, from 1822, he set up home in rooms formerly occupied by the studio and gallery of the painter Thomas Sully, who, the following year, painted Vaughan’s portrait.

Vaughan was distinguished for his philanthropic activities, serving as President of the Pennsylvania Institution for the Instruction of the Blind; President of the Society of the Sons of St George; a Director of the Pennsylvania Academy of the Fine Arts; Vice-president of the Athenaeum of Philadelphia, a Trustee of the Unitarian Society; and a Councillor of the Historical Society of Pennsylvania. Furthermore, he was Secretary and Treasurer of the Philadelphia Chamber of Commerce; a Director of the Insurance Company of North America and of the Delaware Insurance Company of Philadelphia; and an Agent of the firm of E. I. Du Pont de Nemours and Company. He was an active member of the First Unitarian Church of Philadelphia, where he occasionally occupied the pulpit.

John Vaughan, who never married, died in his rooms in Philosophical Hall. The beneficiaries of his bequest included his friend Jacob Snider, who had been brought up by Vaughan, as well as various learned and philanthropic societies. Vaughan’s fifty years of service to the American Philosophical Society were overshadowed by the discovery after his death that he had mingled the Society's funds with his own, though there was no suggestion that he was the gainer thereby, or the Society the loser.

== See also ==
- Jane Aitken
