= Benjamin Vaughan =

British diplomat and politician

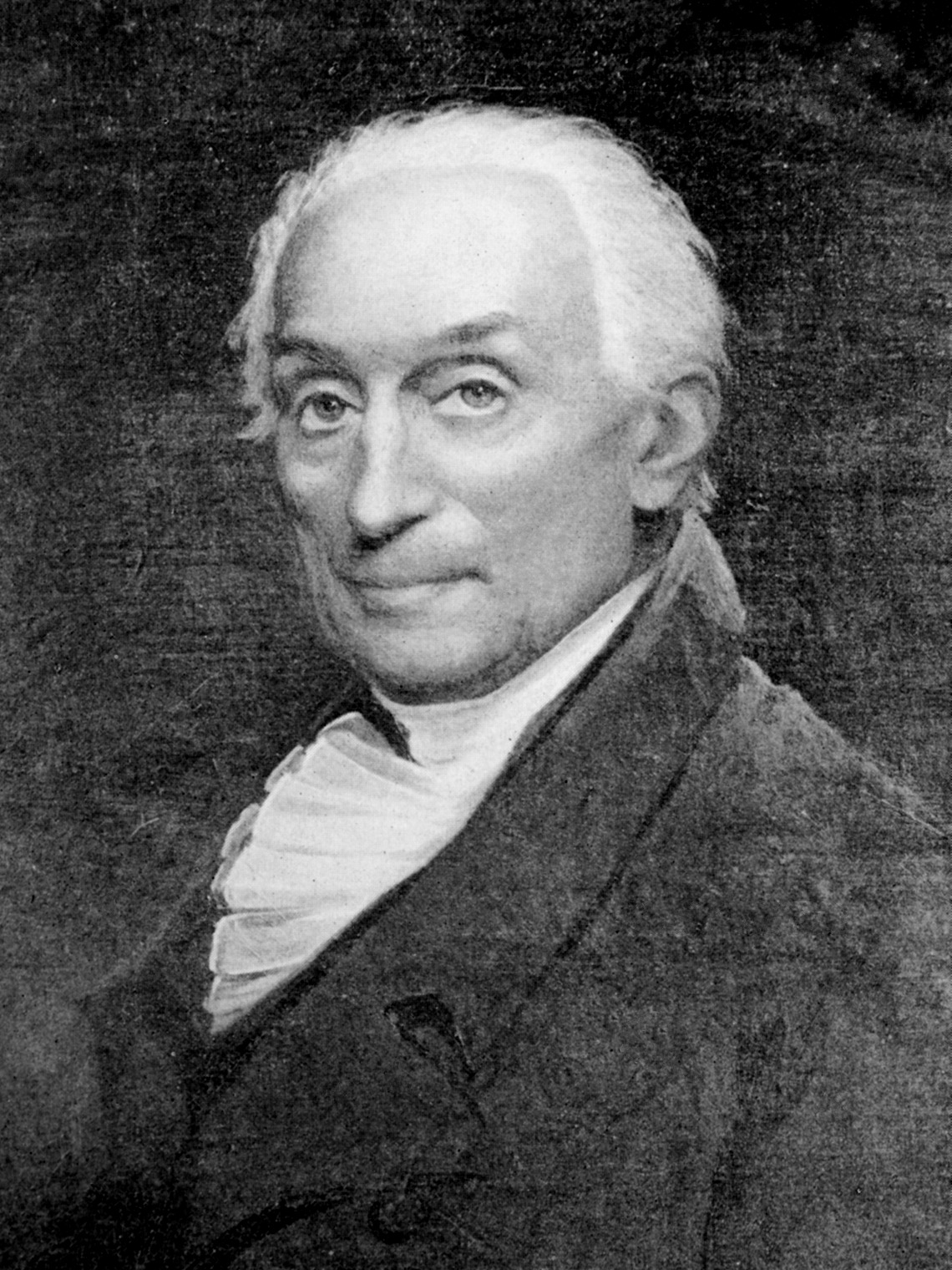
- Born: 19 April 1751; Colony of Jamaica, British Empire
- Died: 8 December 1835 (aged 84); Hallowell, Maine, United States
- Education: Newcome's School; Warrington Academy; Trinity Hall, Cambridge
- Occupations: Commissioner, politician
- Spouse: Sarah Manning (m. 1781)
- Parent(s): Samuel Vaughan; Sarah Hallowell
- Relatives: William Vaughan (brother); John Vaughan (brother)

Benjamin Vaughan MD FRSE LLD (19 April 1751 – 8 December 1835) was a British political radical. He was a commissioner in the negotiations between Britain and the United States at the drafting of the Treaty of Paris.

== Life ==
Vaughan was born in Jamaica to Samuel Vaughan, a British banker and West India merchant planter of Irish Protestant descent, and his Anglo-American wife, Sarah Hallowell, daughter of shipbuilder, Benjamin Hallowell.

He was educated at Newcome's School and Warrington Academy and attended Trinity Hall, Cambridge, without graduating. He then studied medicine at the University of Edinburgh. In 1785, during his stay in Edinburgh, he was elected a Fellow of the Royal Society of Edinburgh. His proposers were Allan Maconochie, Lord Meadowbank, Dugald Stewart, and James Hutton.

His broader long-term interest was in politics and sciences, the latter leading to his friendship with Benjamin Franklin. In 1786, Vaughan was elected a member of the American Philosophical Society in Philadelphia, to which his father, Samuel Vaughan, had been elected a member two years prior.

Vaughan was a political economist, merchant and medical doctor. Through Benjamin Horne, brother of John Horne, he met the politician Lord Shelburne. Shelburne then used Vaughan in a diplomatic role, to try to bring peace between Great Britain and the United States, towards the end of the American War of Independence. He was also a middleman in reconciling Franklin and Shelburne.

He was elected at a by-election in 1792 as a Member of Parliament (MP) for the borough of Calne in Wiltshire, and held the seat until the 1796 general election (he was absent from 1794). He spoke in parliament in strong defence of slavery in Jamaica, in his maiden speech. However, in February 1794, he came out in favour of the abolition of the slave trade. He felt that since slaves could no longer be repressed by ignorance and fear, they should be given inducements not to rebel. During his period in London he lived in Finsbury Square. He was arrested in 1794 on grounds of treason, regarding the supposed invasion of England by the French.

After 1794, Vaughan left France for Switzerland and later to America. His interest in republicanism lead to his permanent departure from Britain. He settled in Boston and then on a farm in Hallowell, Maine in 1797.

He is thought to be the builder (or related to the builder) of Hallowell House in Boston, and it is possible his Jamaican links give rise to the district being called Jamaica Plain.

In 1805, Vaughan was elected a Fellow of the American Academy of Arts and Sciences, and in 1813, he was elected a member of the American Antiquarian Society.

He died in Hallowell in 1835.

== Family ==
Coat of Arms of Benjamin Vaughan

Vaughan married in 1781 to Sarah Manning, daughter of William Manning (died 1791), and sister of William Manning. They had several children, including:

- Harriet Manning Vaughan (1782–1798)
- William Oliver Vaughan (1784–1826), who married Mary Argy (1786–1856)
- Sarah Vaughan (1785–1847)
- Henry Vaughan (1786–1806)
- Petty Vaughan (1788–1854)
- Lucy Vaughan (1790–1869), who married William Emmons (1784–1855)
- Elizabeth Frances Vaughan (1793–1855), who married Samuel Clinton Grant (1796–1853)

The family and their descendants remained in Maine after Vaughan settled in Hallowell in 1797 and continue to reside in the town today.

John Vaughan and William Vaughan were his brothers.

== Legacy ==
Several places are named after Vaughan:

- City of Vaughan, Ontario is in his honour
- Indirectly Vaughan Road is linked to him as the northern end of the road headed into then Township of Vaughan.
- Vaughan Road Academy, named after Vaughan Road
- Vaughan Stream in Hallowell, Maine
- Vaughan Field in Hallowell
- Vaughan Homestead, his Hallowell estate, now a museum
- Vaughan Secondary School until name change to Hodan Nalayeh Secondary School in 2021

Parliament of Great Britain
Preceded by John Morris; Joseph Jekyll	Member of Parliament for Calne; 1792 – 1796; With: Joseph Jekyll	Succeeded by Sir Francis Baring, Bt; Joseph Jekyll
