= Vaughan Homestead =

Historic house in Maine, United States

- U.S. National Register of Historic Places
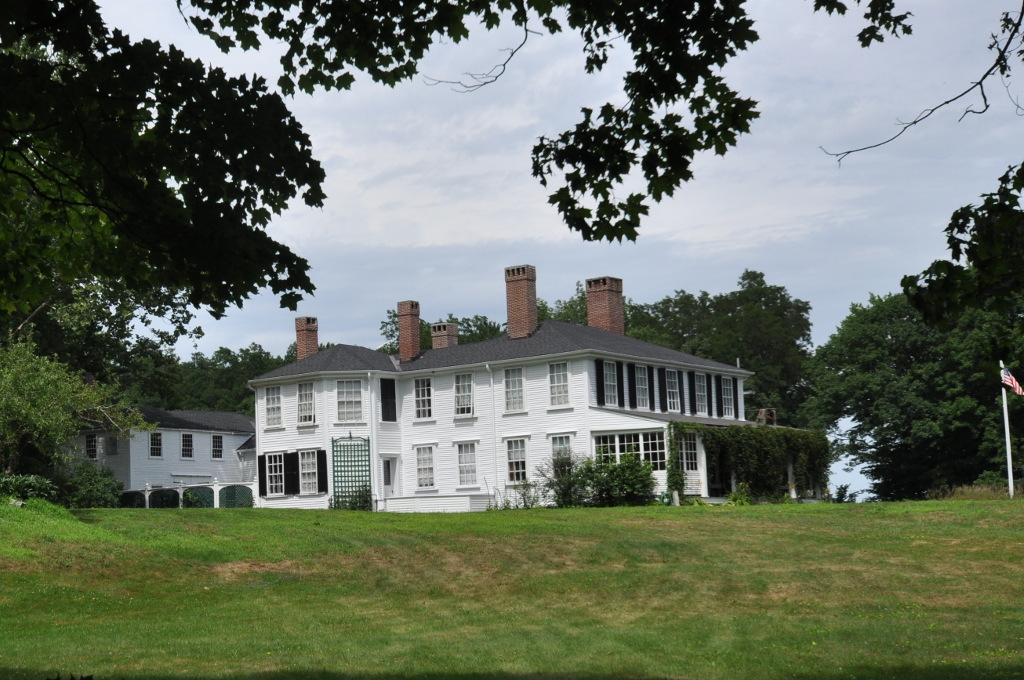

- Location within Maine Location within the United States
- Location: 2 Litchfield Rd., Hallowell, Maine
- Coordinates: 44°16′36″N 69°47′43″W
- Area: 25 acres (10 ha)
- Built: 1797
- NRHP reference No.: 70000091
- Added to NRHP: October 6, 1970

'Vaughan Woods & Historic Homestead' is a non-profit nature preserve and historic house museum in Hallowell, Maine. The trails of Vaughan Woods are open to the public daily from dawn to dusk. They may be accessed via two designated trailhead and parking areas. The Hallowell trailhead does not have a street address, but is easily located at the corner of Litchfield Road and Middle Street. The Farmingdale trailhead is behind the Hall-Dale High School tennis courts at 97 Maple Street. Access to the Homestead and gardens is restricted unless a public program is in session.

== Description and history ==
Vaughan Woods & Historic Homestead is located south of downtown Hallowell on a property overlooking the Kennebec River, that is bounded on the north by Litchfield Road, the west by Interstate 95, the south by public lands containing regional schools, and the east by Greenville Street and small residential roads. The property covers nearly 200 acres (81 ha), much of it woodland. The northern third is separated from the south by Vaughan Brook, which flows east from Cascade Pond (on the property) to the Kennebec River. It is in this area that the Homestead and outbuildings are located. The house is a large and rambling structure, two stories in height. The original main block is the southernmost portion, except for a covered porch extending across its southeastern face. To the northwest of this block there are a series of ells, also mostly of 19th-century origin, one of which is in a distinctive octagon shape. The house is surrounded by terraced landscaping. To the south and west of the house are woods, with hiking trails offering scenic views and access to historic uses of the property.

The property was part of the once-large holdings of Benjamin Hallowell, one of the Kennebec Proprietors and the namesake of the city. Hallowell's daughter Sarah married Samuel Vaughan, son of a London merchant, and their two sons, Charles and Benjamin, moved to Hallowell in 1791 and 1797, respectively. Charles had the main portion of this house built in 1794 as a summer cottage, but when Benjamin and his family arrived from England in 1797, they turned it into their year-round home. Benjamin Vaughan was a merchant and diplomat, playing a critical role in negotiations ending the American Revolutionary War. Both Vaughans were active in the promotion of business and the economic development of Hallowell.

By the late 19th century, a significant portion of the Vaughan estate had been sold off and cleared of trees. Vaughan descendants William and Benjamin Vaughan began in 1890 to repurchase portions of the estate and restore the woodlands. The present property is largely a product of their efforts. William's heirs donated a conservation easement to the Kennebec Land Trust in 1991, and the property was eventually taken over by a non-profit organization founded in 2002.

== See also ==
- National Register of Historic Places listings in Kennebec County, Maine
