= Vaughan Portrait =

1795 painting by Gilbert Stuart

- George Washington Vaughan portrait
- Artist: Gilbert Stuart
- Year: 1795; 231 years ago
- Medium: Oil on canvas
- Subject: George Washington
- Dimensions: 73 x 60.5 cm
- Condition: On display
- Location: National Gallery of Art, Washington, D.C.
- Owner: National Gallery of Art
- Accession: 1942.8.27
- Website: nga.gov

Vaughan Portrait, also known as the George Washington Vaughan portrait, is an oil portrait of the first U.S. president, George Washington, painted by American painter Gilbert Stuart in 1795 and named after Samuel Vaughan. It was the first portrait of Washington created by Stuart. After its creation, Stuart made several other variations of the portrait. The portrait's current location is at the National Gallery of Art in Washington, D.C.

== History ==
Painter Gilbert Stuart painted the Vaughan Portrait in 1795 and named it after Samuel Vaughan, an Anglo-Irish merchant and political radical. The year it was painted, it was taken to England and was not returned until 1851. The painting is of George Washington and is the first painting painted by Stuart of Washington. Stuart painted many other variations after the original one, most notably the Vaughan-Sinclair portrait, which was painted the same year as the first.

In 1795 Vaughan bought the painting for an undisclosed amount of money. It was bought again in 1912 for $16,100 and was valued by Knoedler at $175,000 in 1936. As of 2026, the painting currently sits in the National Gallery of Art in Washington, D.C.

== Description ==
The painting shows Washington from the chest up against a deep red wine background. His body is turned slightly to the viewer's right while he faces directly toward the viewer. He has pale skin, gray eyes, flushed cheeks, a hooked nose, and white hair that points out at the sides and is tied at the back with a ribbon. He wears a high-collared black coat and a cream-white ruffled cravat. The background fades from a brighter red around his face to darker tones near the corners.

== Variations ==
13 other variations of the painting exist, including the Gibbs-Channing-Avery Portrait held at the Metropolitan Museum of Art. In 2024, The Met deaccessioned a second variation, referred to as the Philips-Brixey Portrait, realizing a price of $2.83 million; it was also called one of the rarest paintings of Washington.

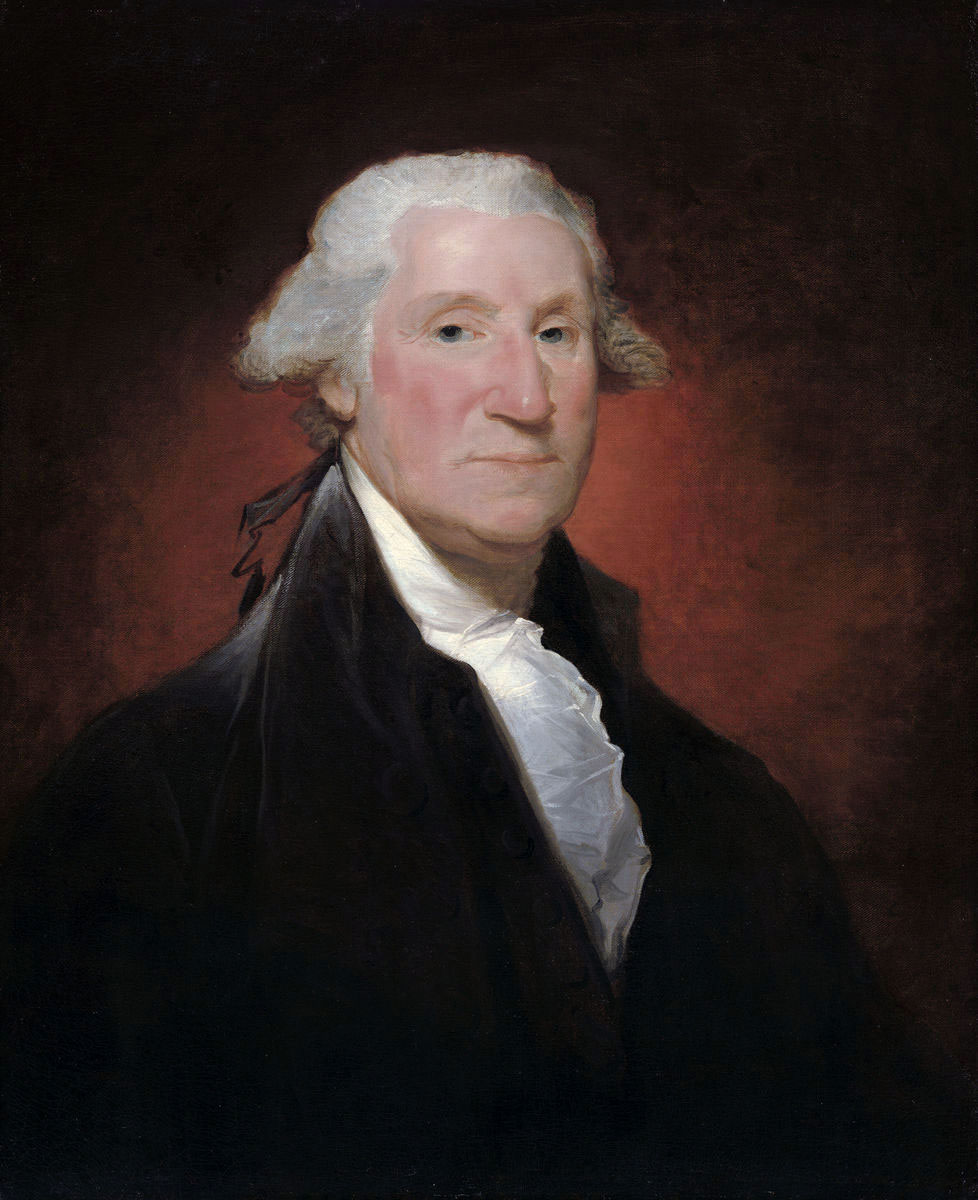

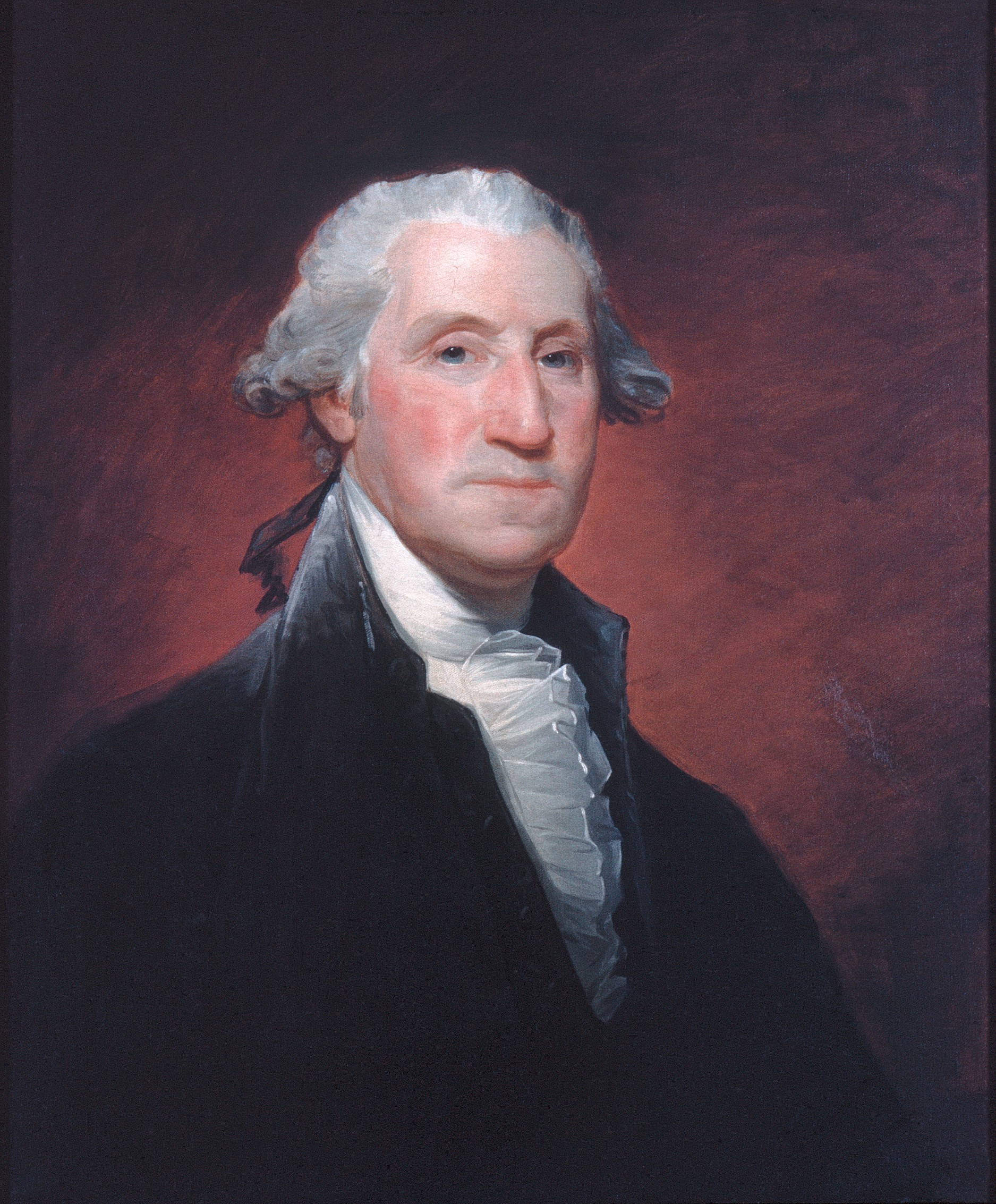

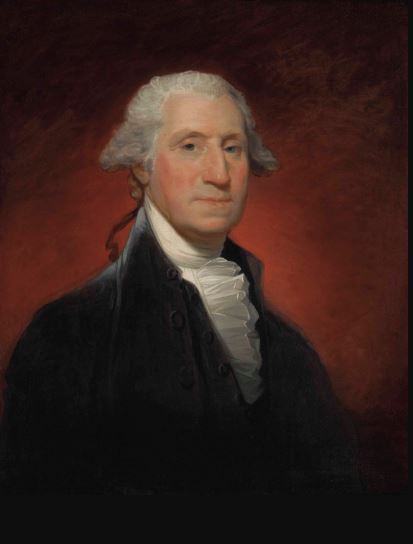

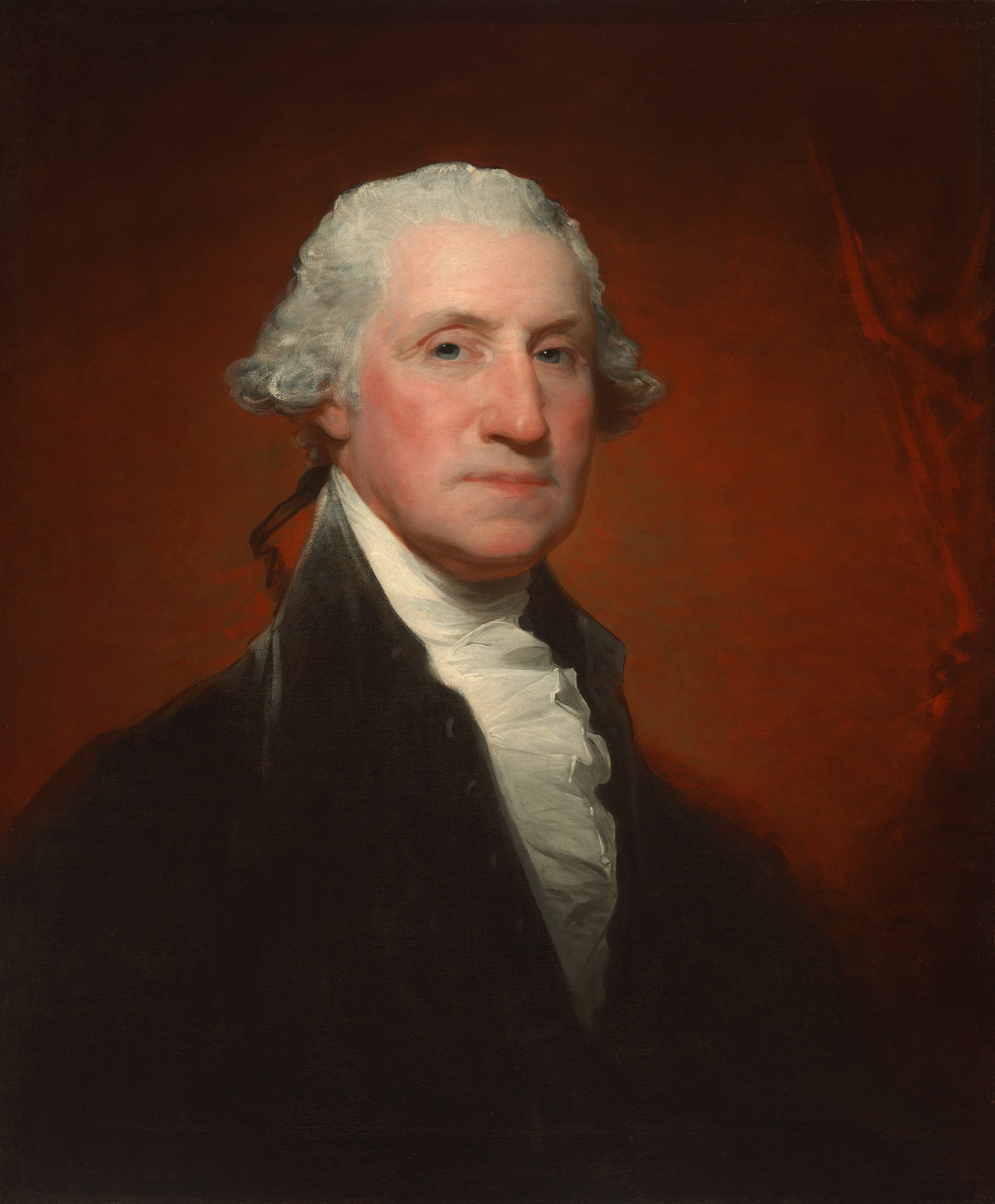
Vaughan-Sinclair Portrait

== See also ==
- Athenaeum Portrait – 1796 unfinished portrait of George Washington by Gilbert Stuart
- Lansdowne Portrait – 1796 painting by Gilbert Stuart
- List of paintings of George Washington
