= William Vaughan (merchant) =

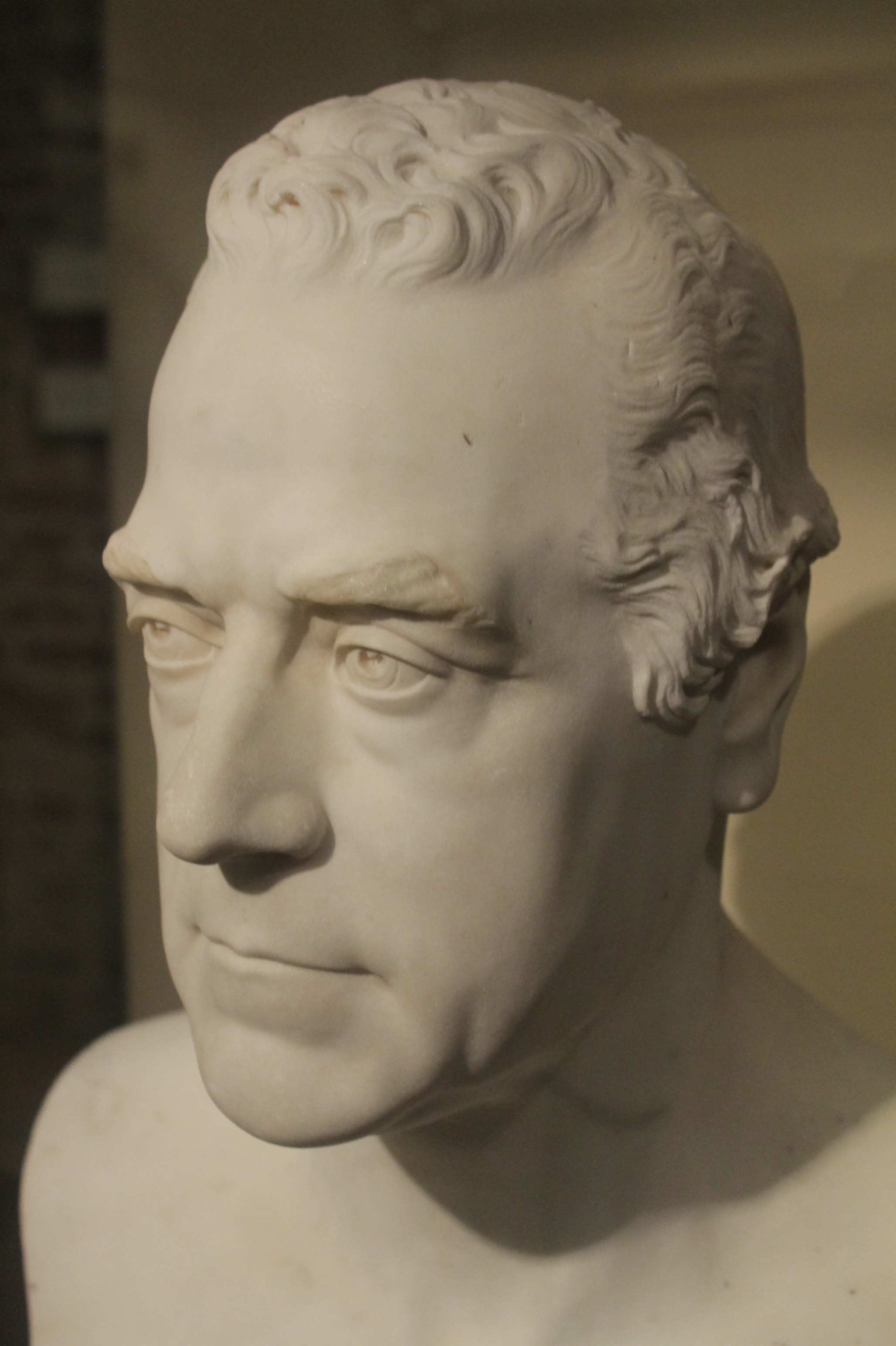
- William Vaughan by Chantrey 1811
- Born: 22 September 1752
- Died: 5 May 1850 (aged 97); London
- Education: Newcome's School; Hackney; Warrington Academy
- Occupations: Merchant, author
- Parent(s): Samuel Vaughan; Sarah Hallowell

William Vaughan (22 September 1752 – 5 May 1850) was an English West India merchant and author.

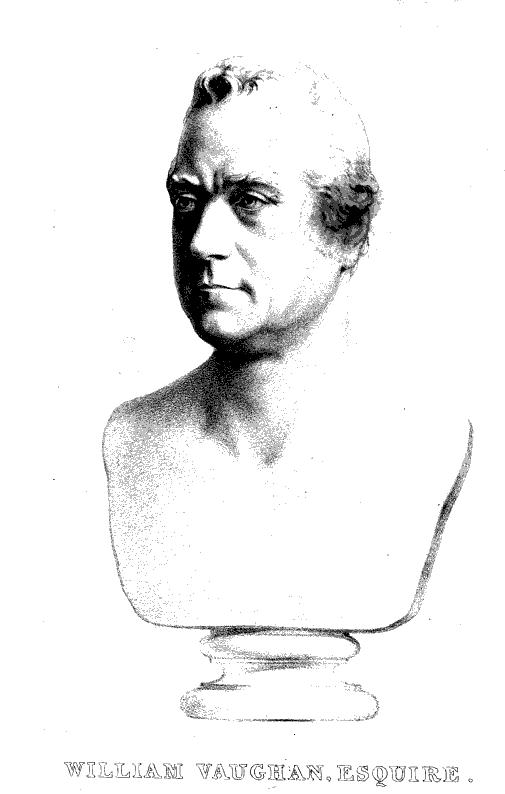
William Vaughan, drawing of the 1811 bust by Francis Chantrey

== Life ==
Born on 22 September 1752, he was the second son of Samuel Vaughan, a merchant in London and Jamaica, by his wife Sarah, daughter of Benjamin Hallowell of Boston, Massachusetts. Benjamin Vaughan was his elder brother. He was educated at Newcome's School in Hackney and Warrington Academy.

After leaving school Vaughan entered his father's business, and became prominent in commerce.

In April 1782 Vaughan travelled to Amsterdam to meet John Adams, as part of the negotiations to end the American War of Independence. In 1783 he was elected a director of the Royal Exchange Assurance Corporation, and continued in it, as director, sub-governor, and governor, until 1829. During the Nore mutiny in 1797, Vaughan formed one of the committees of London merchants convened to meet at the Royal Exchange to deal with it. He independently drew up a short address to the seamen which was put in circulation by the naval authorities.

From 1793 to 1797 Vaughan published a series of pamphlets and tracts advocating the construction of docks for the Port of London. On 22 April 1796 he gave evidence before a parliamentary committee in favour of the bill for establishing wet docks. Later that year he was on the committee planning docks, with Robert Milligan, George Hibbert and Beeston Long. Plans were laid for docks at Wapping; but the following year Milligan and Hibbert broke away to follow their own, more exclusive plans at the Isle of Dogs. Vaughan became a director of the London Dock Company in 1805.

Vaughan was a Fellow of the Royal Society, the Linnean Society, and of the Royal Astronomical Society. He was a member of the New England Corporation, and its governor till 1829. He was also a member of the Society for Bettering the Condition of the Poor, which was instrumental in 1815 in establishing the first savings bank in London, at Leicester Place in Westminster. He was a governor of Christ's Hospital and an honorary member of the Society of Civil Engineers. He was elected a member of the American Philosophical Society in 1830 and a Foreign Honorary Member of the American Academy of Arts and Sciences in 1840.

Vaughan died in London on 5 May 1850, at his residence, 70 Fenchurch Street.

== Works ==
Vaughan was the author of:

- On Wet Docks, Quays, and Warehouses for the Port of London, London, 1793.
- Plan of the London Dock, with some Observations respecting the River, London, 1794.
- Answers to Objections against the London Docks, London, 1796.
- A Letter to a Friend on Commerce and Free Ports and London Docks, London, 1796.
- Examination of William Vaughan in Committee of the House of Commons, London, 1796.
- Reasons in favour of London Docks, London, 1797.
- A Comparative Statement of the Advantages and Disadvantages of the Docks in Wapping and the Isle of Dogs, 2nd ed. London, 1799.

The first six were published together in 1797 as A Collection of Tracts on Wet Docks for the Port of London, with Hints on Trade and Commerce and on Free Ports. They were republished in 1839, with the Comparative Statement and other pieces as Tracts on Docks and Commerce, printed between 1793 and 1800.

In 1791 Vaughan tried to form a society for the promotion of English canals. He made a collection, in three folio volumes, of plans and descriptions relating to the subject. He edited the captivity narrative The Narrative of Captain David Woodard and Four Seamen: Who Lost Their Ship While in A Boat at Sea, and Surrendered Themselves Up to the Malays (1804).

== Notes ==
Attribution

This article incorporates text from a publication now in the public domain: Lee, Sidney, ed. (1899). "Vaughan, William (1752-1850)". Dictionary of National Biography. Vol. 58. London: Smith, Elder & Co.
