= Gibbs-Channing-Avery Portrait =

Portrait of George Washington by Gilbert Stuart

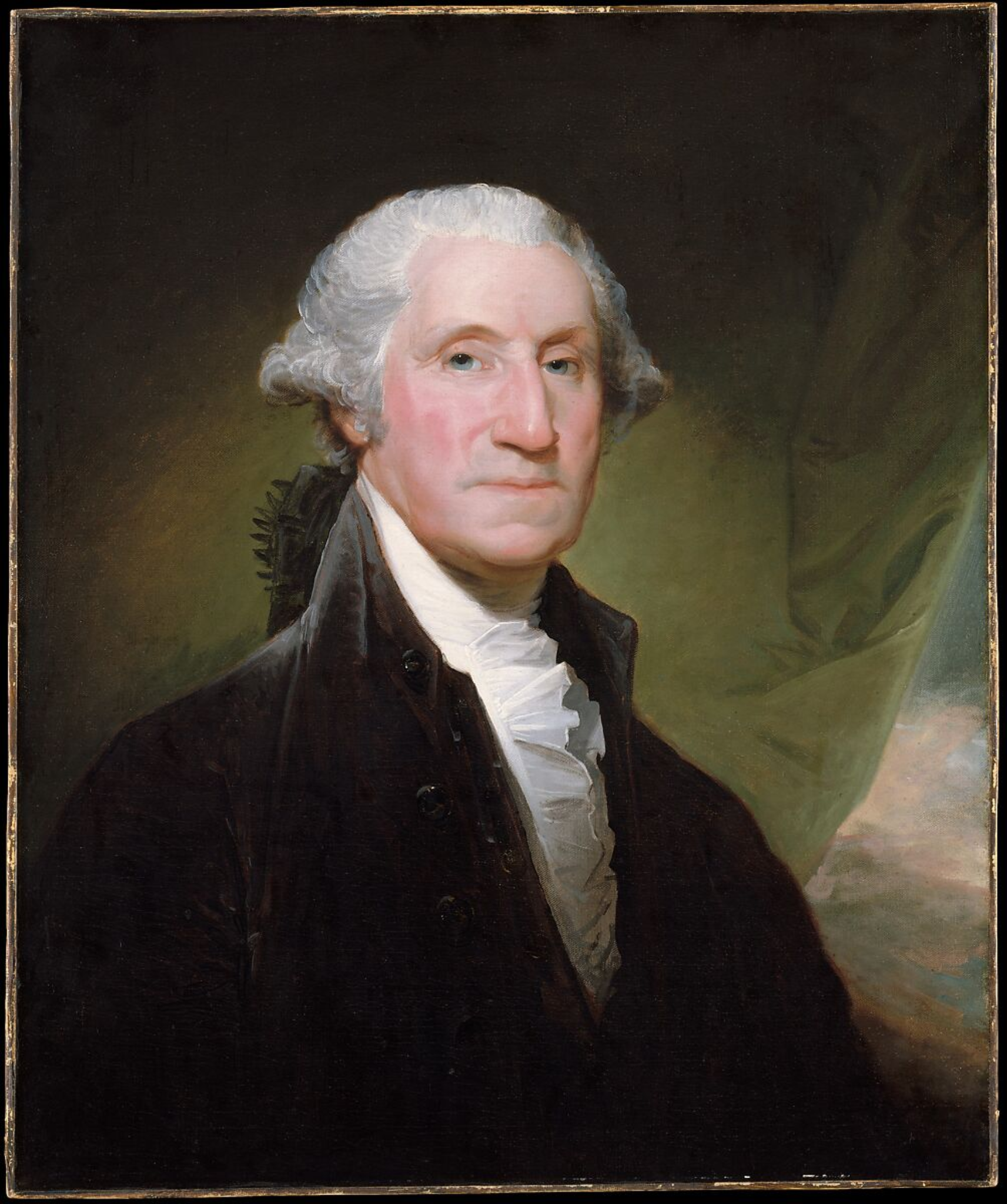
- Artist: Gilbert Stuart
- Year: 1795
- Medium: Oil on canvas
- Subject: George Washington
- Dimensions: 76.8 cm × 64.1 cm (30.2 in × 25.2 in)
- Location: Metropolitan Museum of Art, New York City

The Gibbs-Channing-Avery Portrait is an oil painting of George Washington, the first U.S. president and one of the Founding Fathers of the United States, painted by Gilbert Stuart in 1795.

== History ==
The portrait was created in 1795 as a stem of the Vaughan Portrait and belongs to a group called the "Vaughan Group". The Gibbs-Channing-Avery Portrait is one of the earliest and highest-quality replicas Stuart painted based directly on the original sitting.

== Copies ==
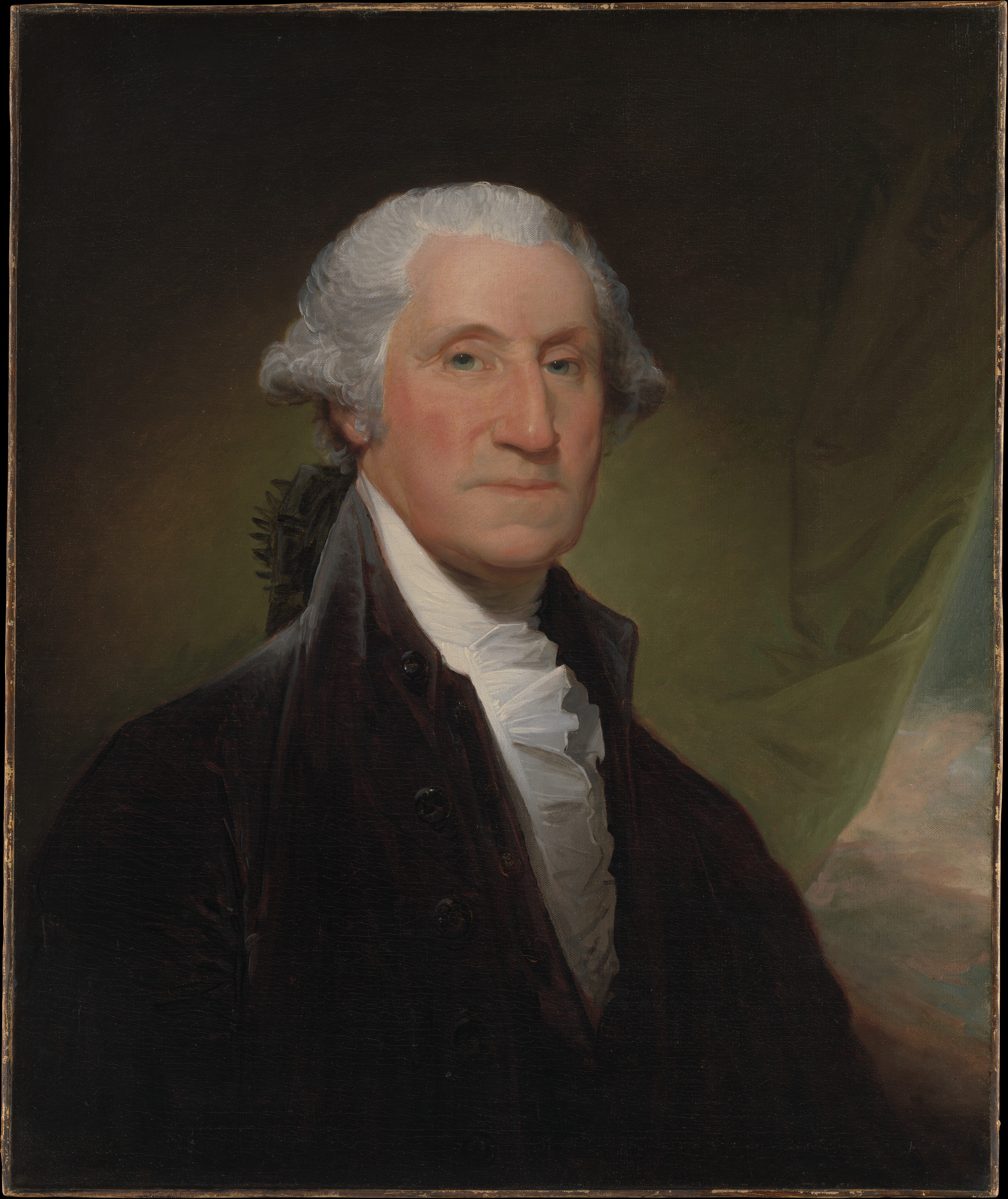

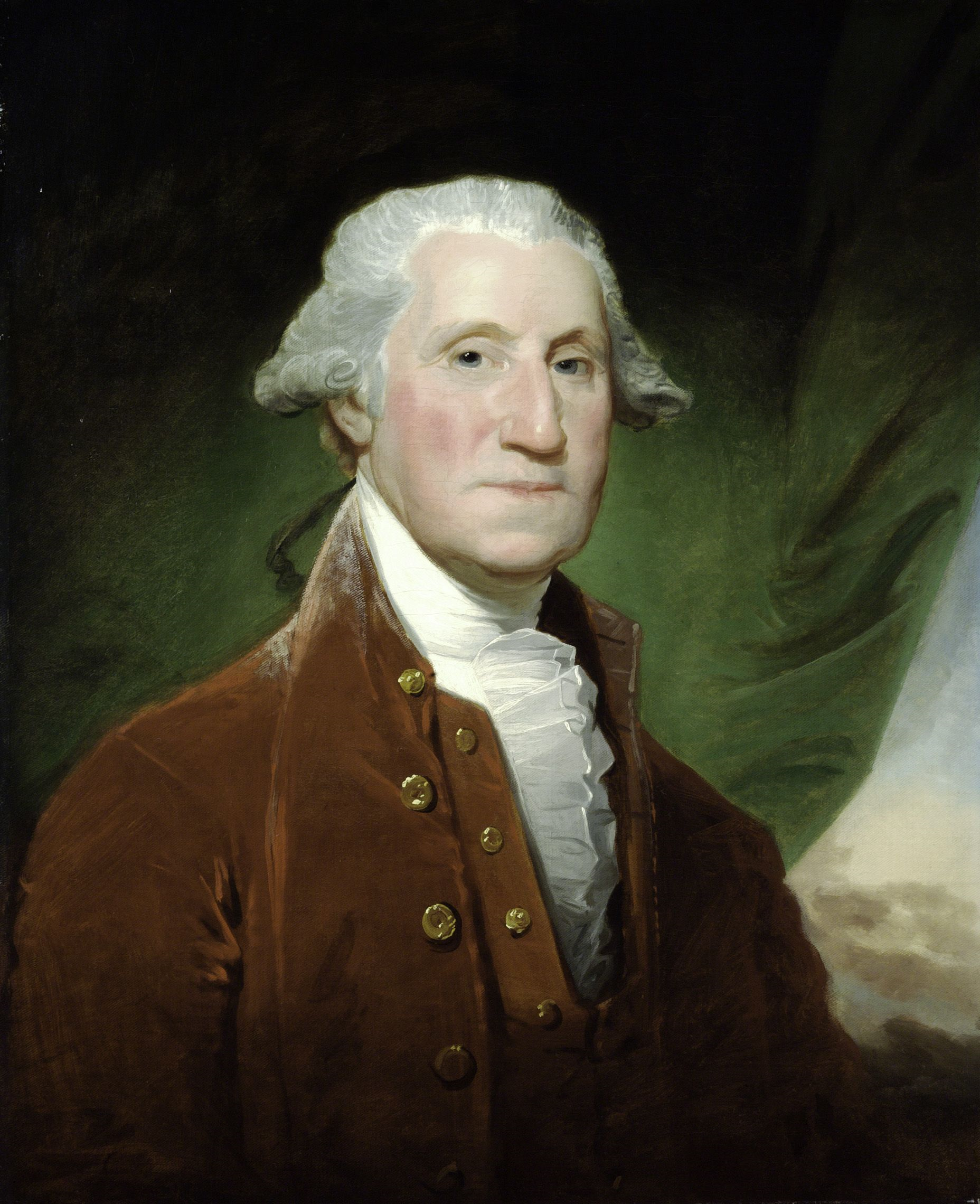

== See also ==
- List of paintings of George Washington
- Athenaeum Portrait
- Lansdowne Portrait
