= George Washington (Stuart, Williamstown) =

1803 painting by Gilbert Stuart

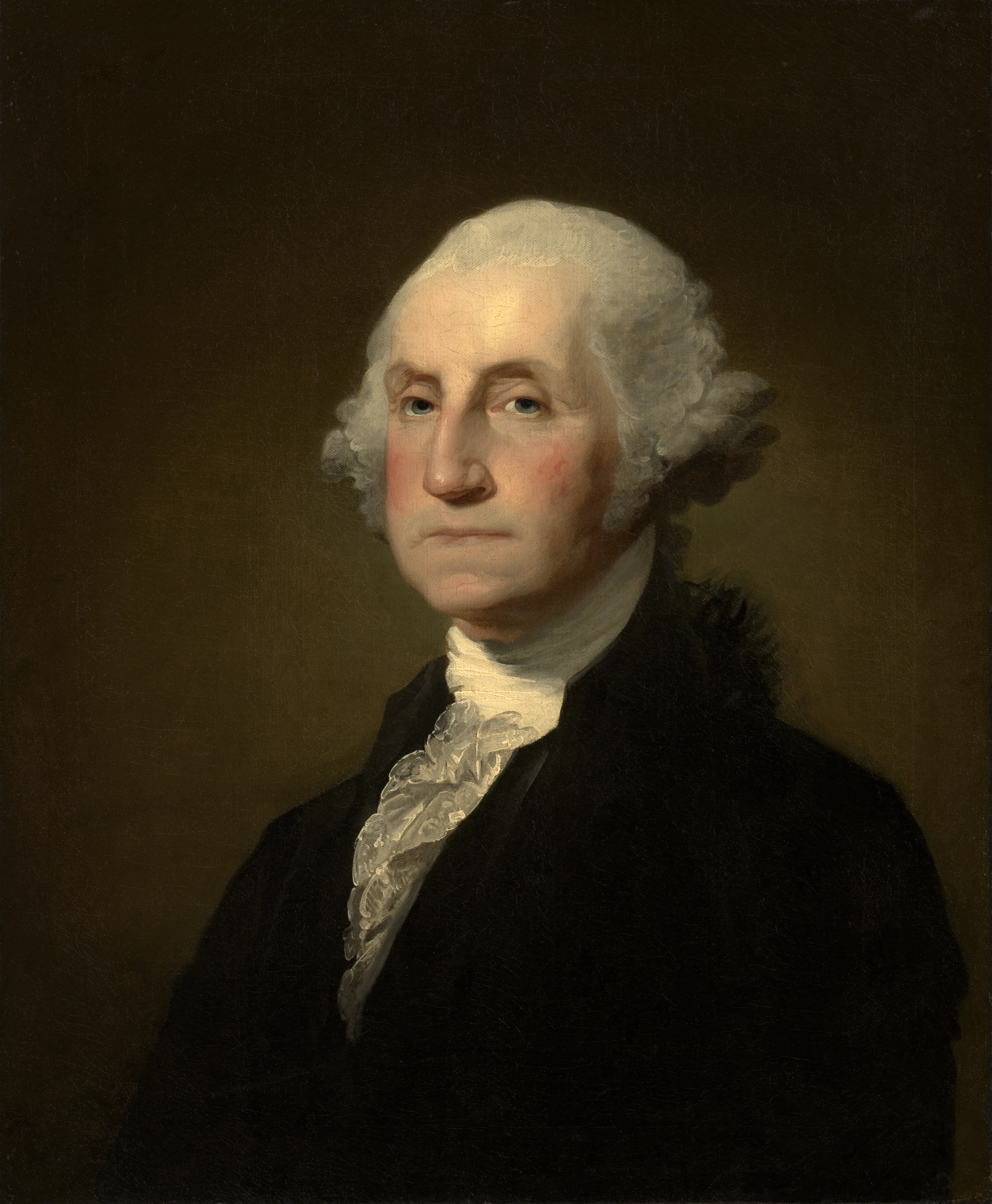
- Artist: Gilbert Stuart
- Year: 1803; 223 years ago
- Medium: Oil on canvas
- Subject: George Washington
- Dimensions: 28.15 × 24.1
- Location: Clark Art Institute
- Accession: 1955.16

George Washington is an 1803 painting of the Founding Father and first president of the United States, George Washington, by American painter Gilbert Stuart and was one of the many presidential portraits used for Washington. The painting is based on the unfinished painting Athenaeum Portrait.

== See also ==
- List of paintings of George Washington
