= Athenaeum Portrait =

1796 unfinished portrait of George Washington by Gilbert Stuart

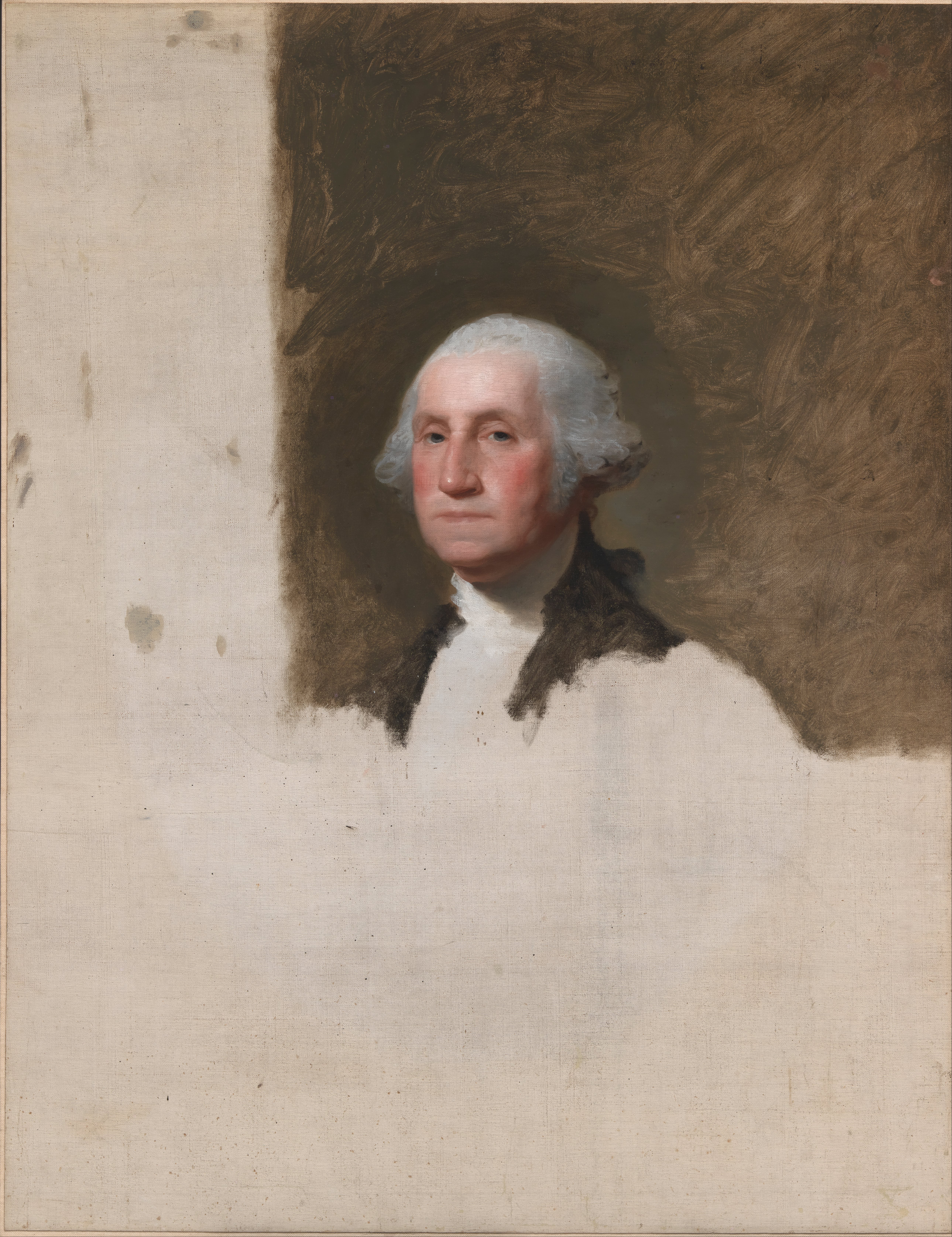
- Artist: Gilbert Stuart
- Year: 1796; 230 years ago
- Medium: Oil on canvas
- Subject: George Washington
- Dimensions: 121.9 cm × 94 cm (48.0 in × 37 in)
- Location: Museum of Fine Arts, Boston
- Owner: Museum of Fine Arts, Boston and the National Portrait Gallery jointly
- Accession: 1980.1
- Website: www.mfa.org/collections/object/george-washington-34341

The Athenaeum Portrait, also known as The Athenaeum, is an unfinished painting by Gilbert Stuart of United States President George Washington. Created in 1796, it is Stuart's most notable work. The painting depicts Washington at age 64, about three years before his death, on a brown background. It served as the model for the engraving that would be used for Washington's portrait on the United States one-dollar bill.

A corresponding portrait of Martha Washington is also known as the Athenaeum Portrait, and is exhibited near the painting of her husband at the Boston Museum of Fine Arts and the National Portrait Gallery, Washington, D.C.

== Description ==
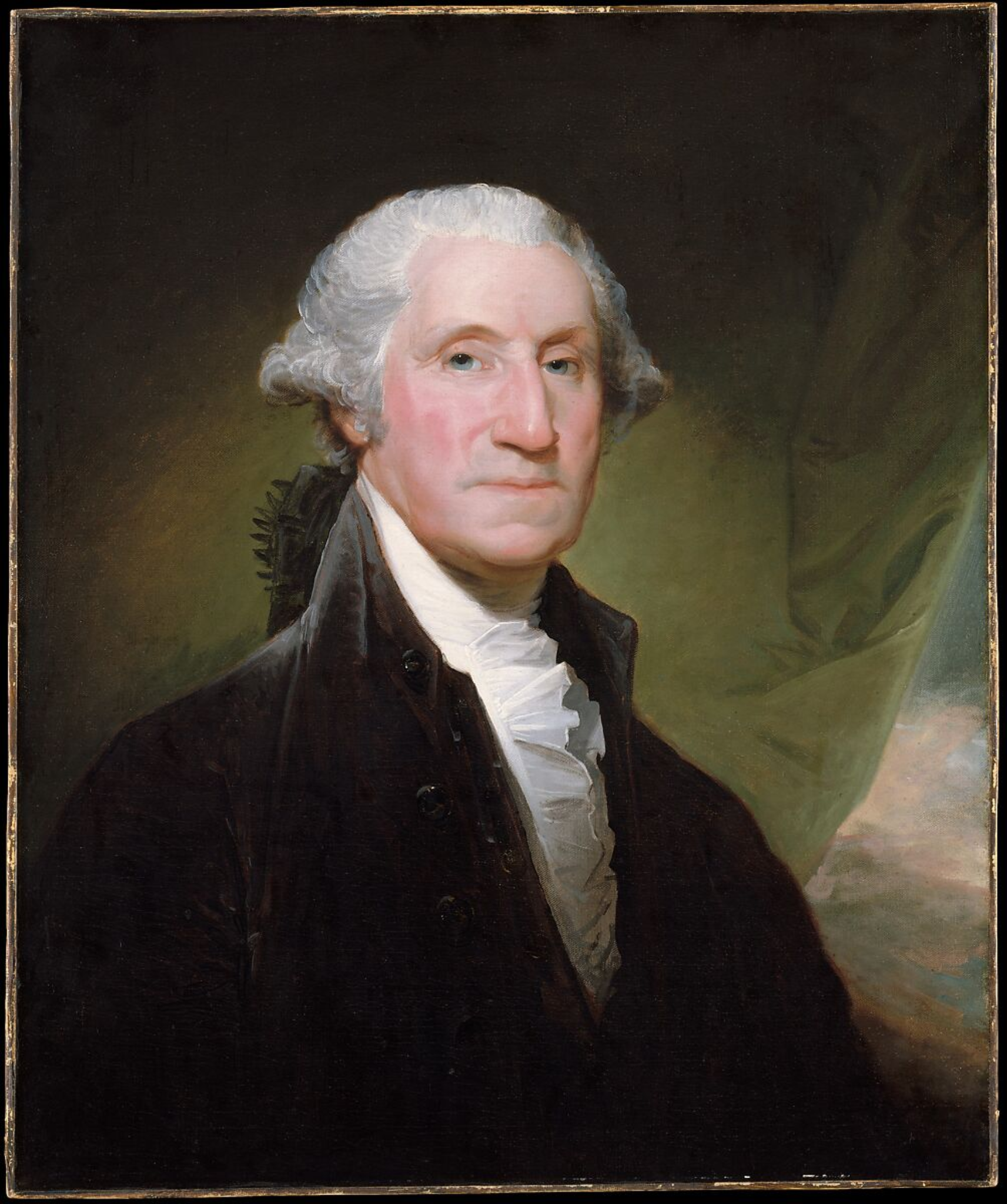
The Gibbs-Channing-Avery Portrait, c. 1795, by Gilbert Stuart, an early presidential portrait (not based on the Athenaeum Portrait), Metropolitan Museum of Art

The painting is called The Athenaeum as, after the death of Stuart, the portrait was sent to the Boston Athenæum. It is Stuart's most famous work. He started painting the portrait in 1796, in Germantown, Pennsylvania (now a neighborhood within Philadelphia). The painting is oil on canvas, and depicts only Washington's head and neck, painted when he was 64 years old (about three years before his death in 1799) on a brown background. The rest of the painting is unfinished. The frame was made by a frame maker, picture dealer, and entrepreneur named John Doggett.

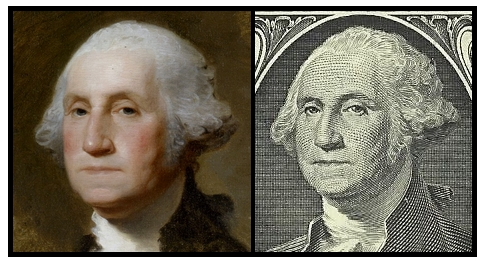
Comparison with the image on the obverse of the United States one-dollar bill (flipped horizontally for ease of comparison)

The painting was never delivered to Washington. Instead, Stuart used it as a model for many replicas, capitalizing on Washington's fame. After Washington's death, he used it to paint 130 copies, which he sold for $100 each. More than 60 of these copies still exist. The Athenaeum Portrait was also used to produce a number of U.S. postage stamps of the 19th century and early 20th century. Most notably, the Athenaeum Portrait served as the model for the engraving that would be used (in mirror image) for the United States one-dollar bill.

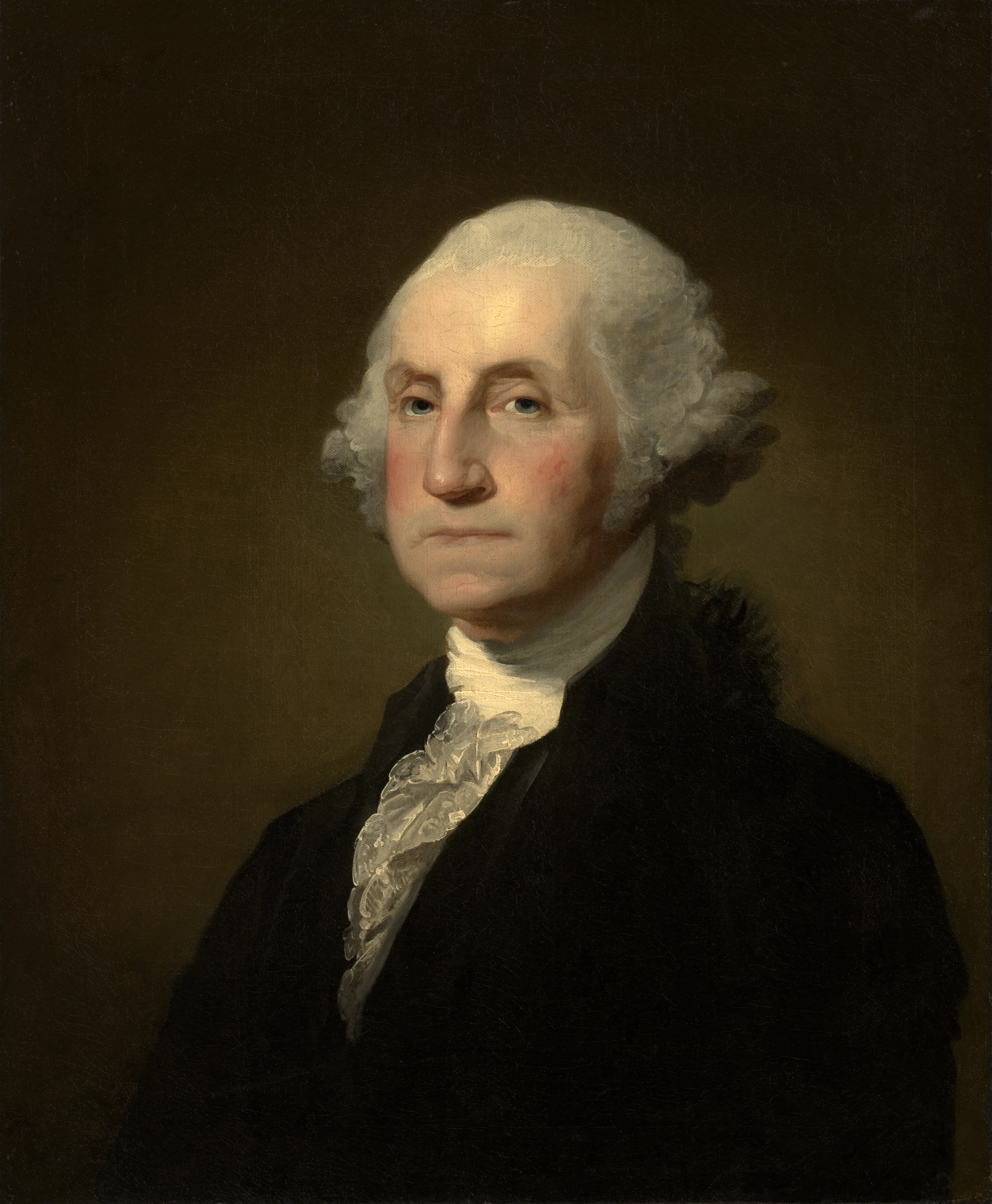
George Washington, c. 1803, one of Stuart's many copies of the Athenaeum Portrait, Walters Art Museum

The painting was owned by Stuart until he died in 1828, after which ownership passed to his daughter, Jane. It was purchased in May 1831 for US$1,500 (equivalent to $45,352 in 2025) by the Trustees of the Boston Athenæum, with money raised via subscription from the Washington Monument Association and 22 other subscribers. It was then given to the Boston Athenæum by them. In 1876 the Boston Athenæum deposited the painting at the Museum of Fine Arts, Boston. In 1980 it was bought by the Museum of Fine Arts, Boston and the National Portrait Gallery jointly from the Boston Athenæum. As of 2024, it splits its time between the Museum of Fine Arts, Boston and the National Portrait Gallery in Washington, DC.

== See also ==
- List of paintings of George Washington
