= Philosophical Hall =

American historic building

- American Philosophical Society Hall
- U.S. National Register of Historic Places
- U.S. National Historic Landmark
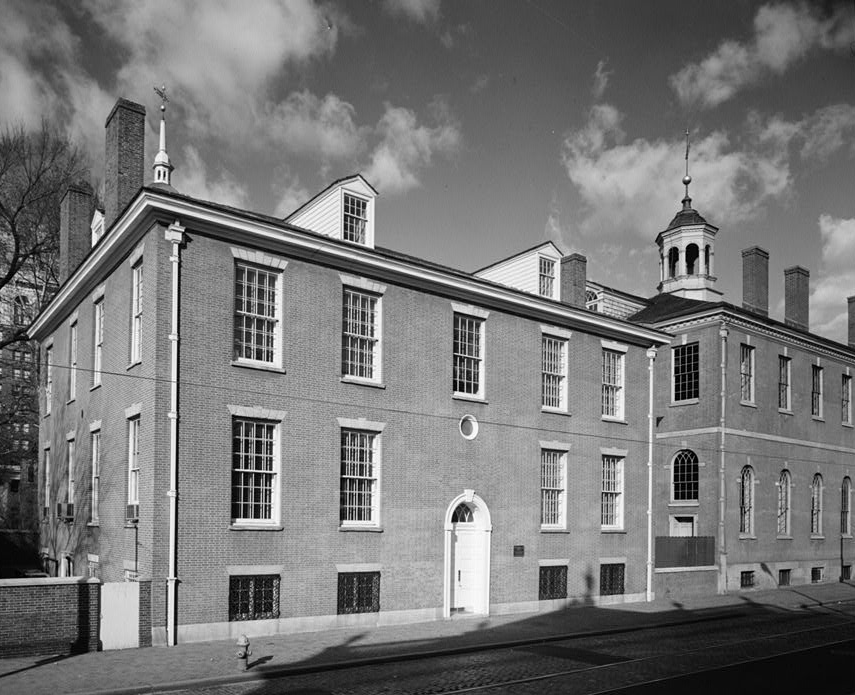
- American Philosophical Society in October 1967

- Location within Philadelphia Location within Pennsylvania Location within the United States
- Location: 104 S. Fifth St. Philadelphia, Pennsylvania, U.S.
- Coordinates: 39°56′55″N 75°08′58″W
- Built: 1787
- Architect: Samuel Vaughan
- Architectural style: Georgian
- NRHP reference No.: 66000675

Significant dates
- Added to NRHP: October 15, 1966
- Designated NHL: January 12, 1965

Philosophical Hall is a historic building at 104 S. 5th Street in Center City, Philadelphia, Pennsylvania, United States. Located near Independence Hall, the building has, for over 200 years, been the headquarters of the American Philosophical Society. It was designated a National Historic Landmark in 1965 for its association with that organization.

== Origin ==
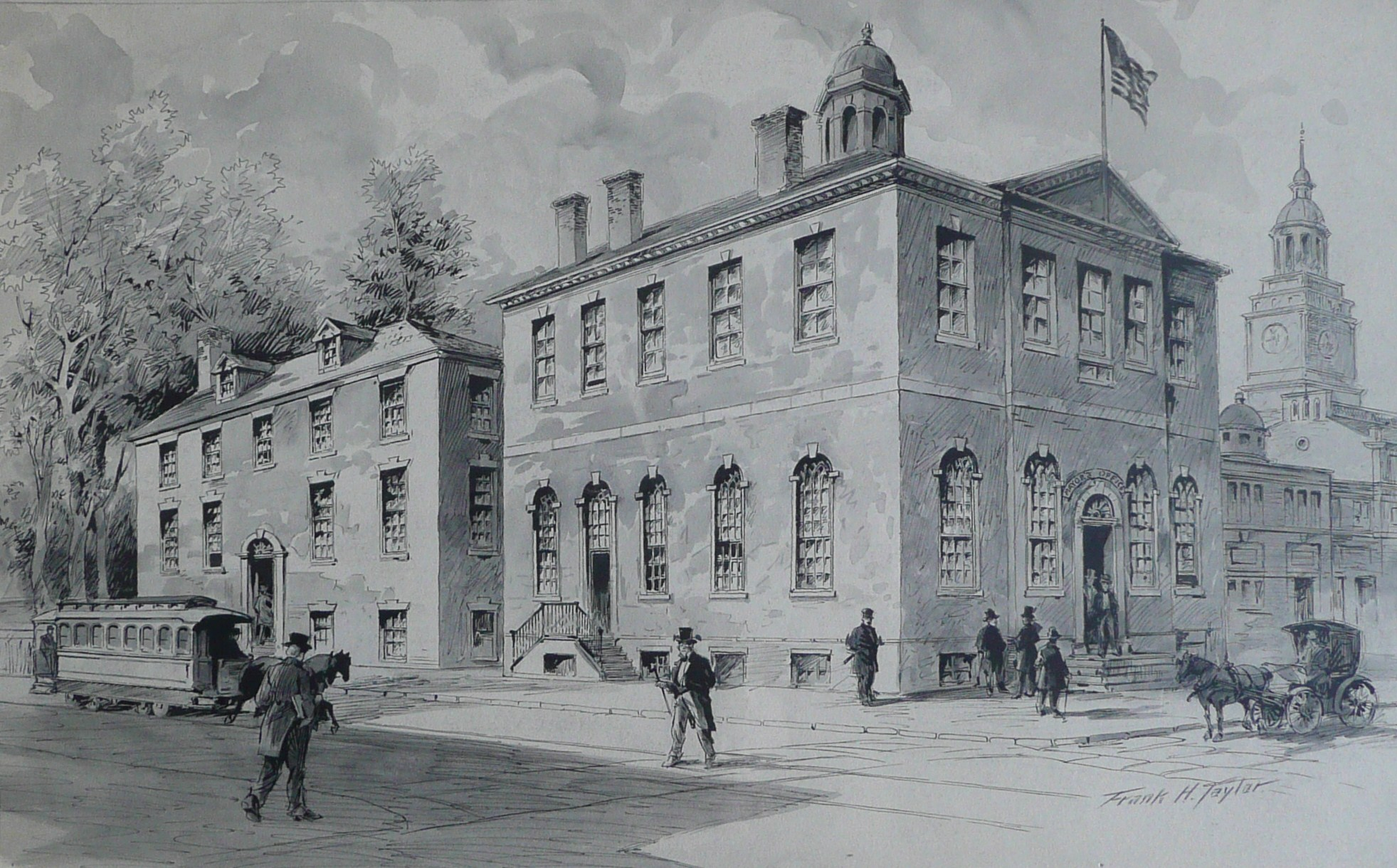
Philosophical Hall, Philadelphia depicted in a 1919 watercolor painting

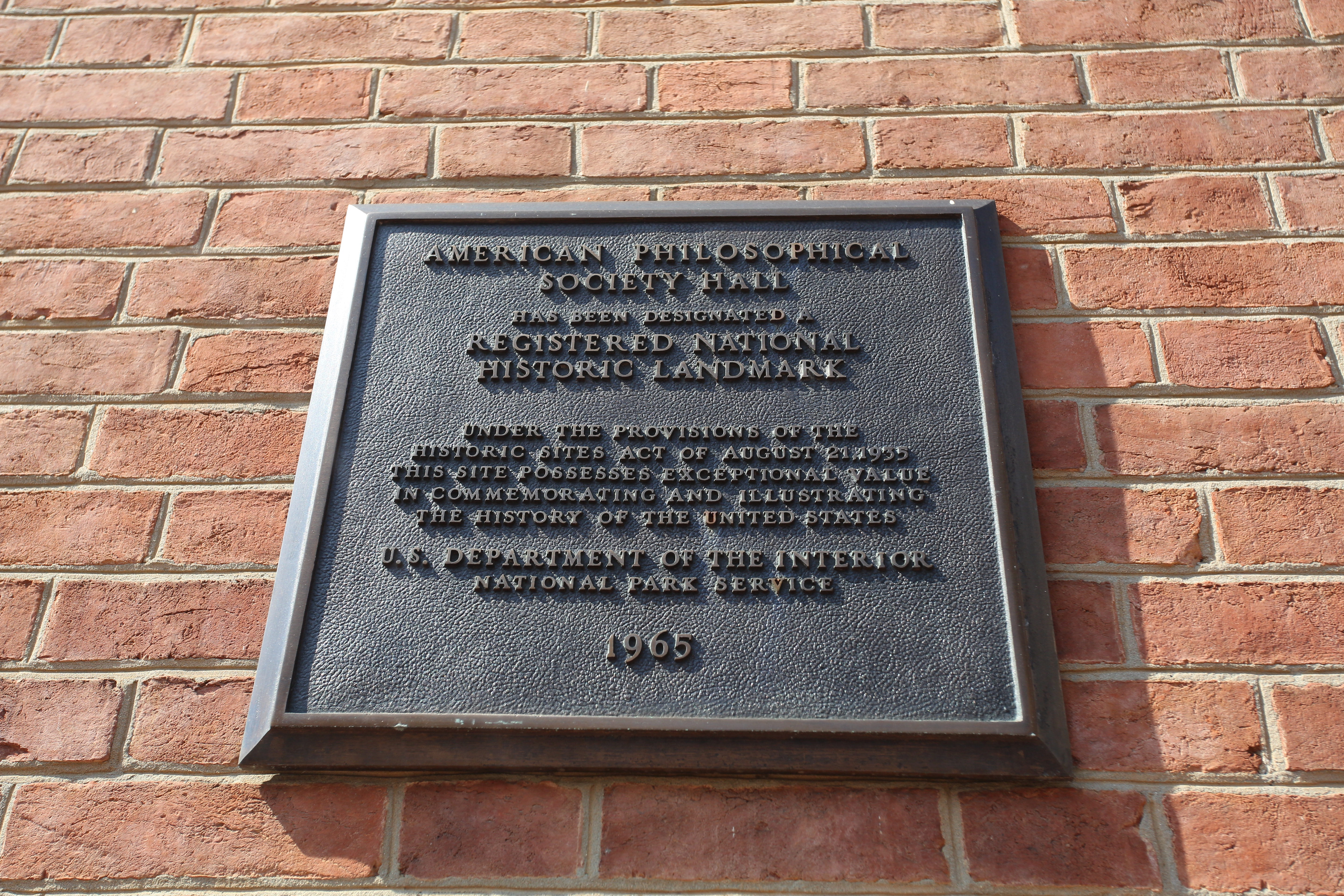
National Historic Landmark Plaque

For twenty years after its founding, the American Philosophical Society (APS) had no home of its own, and met in different locations in Philadelphia. In 1783, APS members voted to construct a building in which meetings could be held. The Society originally considered a lot near Arch Street, but a lot became available in the State House yard, now Independence Square. In 1785 the Pennsylvania Legislative Assembly, who met in State House, today known as Independence Hall, voted to give the lot to the Society.

The Society immediately began the excavation of the cellar of the new building. However, fundraising proceeded slowly, and the building took four years to construct, the final money needed to complete it coming by way of a loan from Society member Benjamin Franklin.

== History ==
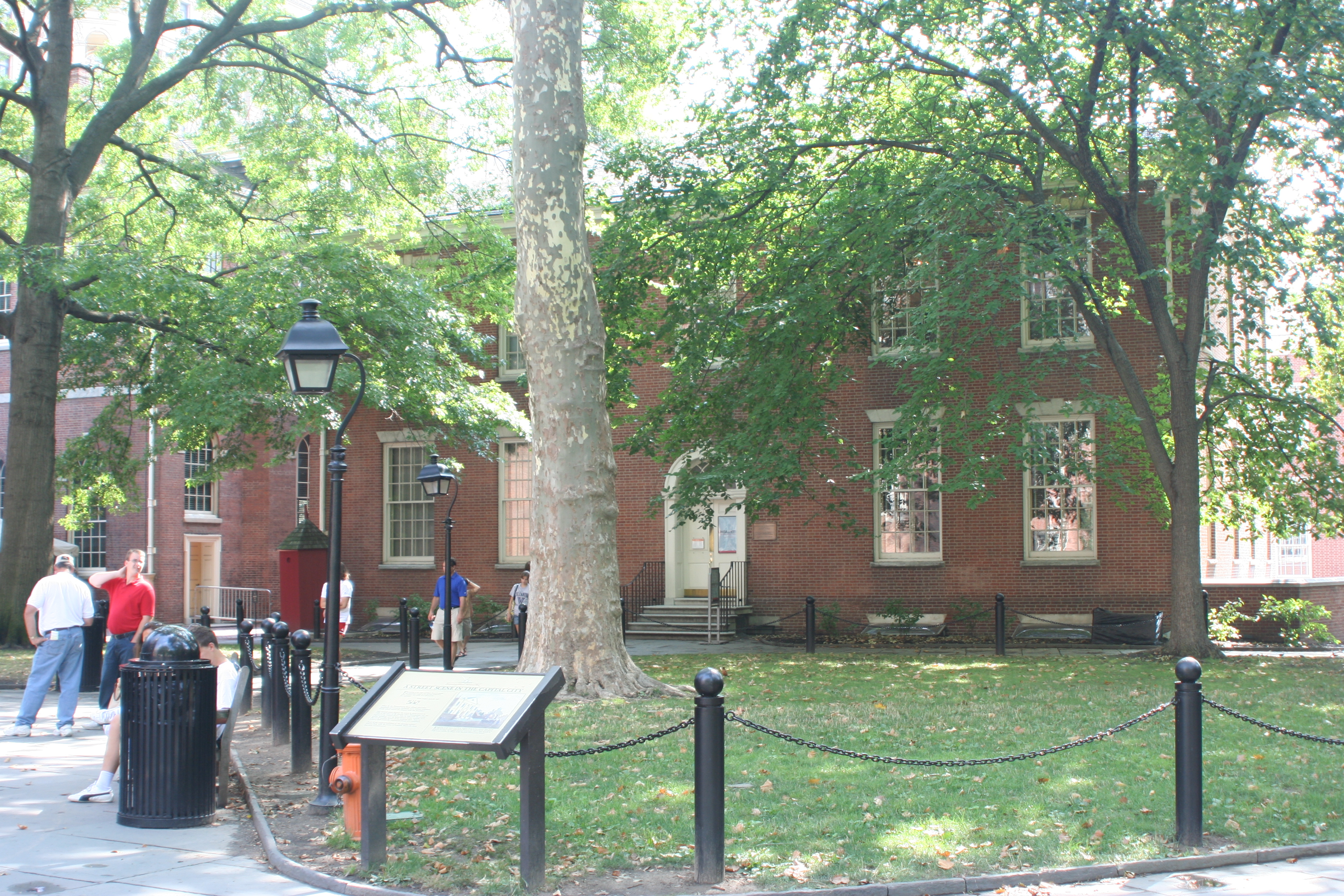
Philosophical Hall in August 2008

Philosophical Hall is used as a place for APS meetings and for its offices and library. The building was larger than the Society's requirements, and it rented out rooms. Classes for the University of Pennsylvania were held here for several years. Charles Willson Peale located his Philadelphia Museum here for several years. Government also rented space—including the city and the United States District Court for the Eastern District of Pennsylvania. The Society finally ended its practice of renting space in 1934, when a significant bequest from a member placed it on a sound financial footing.

The Society considered leaving Philosophical Hall several times, once when the city sought to acquire the building as a courthouse; however, the parties could not agree on a price. In the early 20th century, the Society considered a move to the newly constructed boulevard, the Benjamin Franklin Parkway. Planners hoped to lure intellectual groups to offices on the Parkway. The Society's membership considered this several times, but the 1934 bequest put an end to the discussions; the APS remained at Philosophical Hall. In 1890, the APS built a third story onto Philosophical Hall to house its expanding library, but the addition was considered ugly and was removed in 1949, after the library moved to other space.

Philosophical Hall provides space for the APS's offices and houses a museum that is open to the public April through December each year. The twice-yearly meetings moved to Benjamin Franklin Hall, about a block away, in 1993. It is the only privately owned structure on Independence Square.

== See also ==
- List of National Historic Landmarks in Philadelphia
- National Register of Historic Places listings in Center City, Philadelphia
