= Samuel Vaughan =

Anglo-Irish merchant (1720–1802)

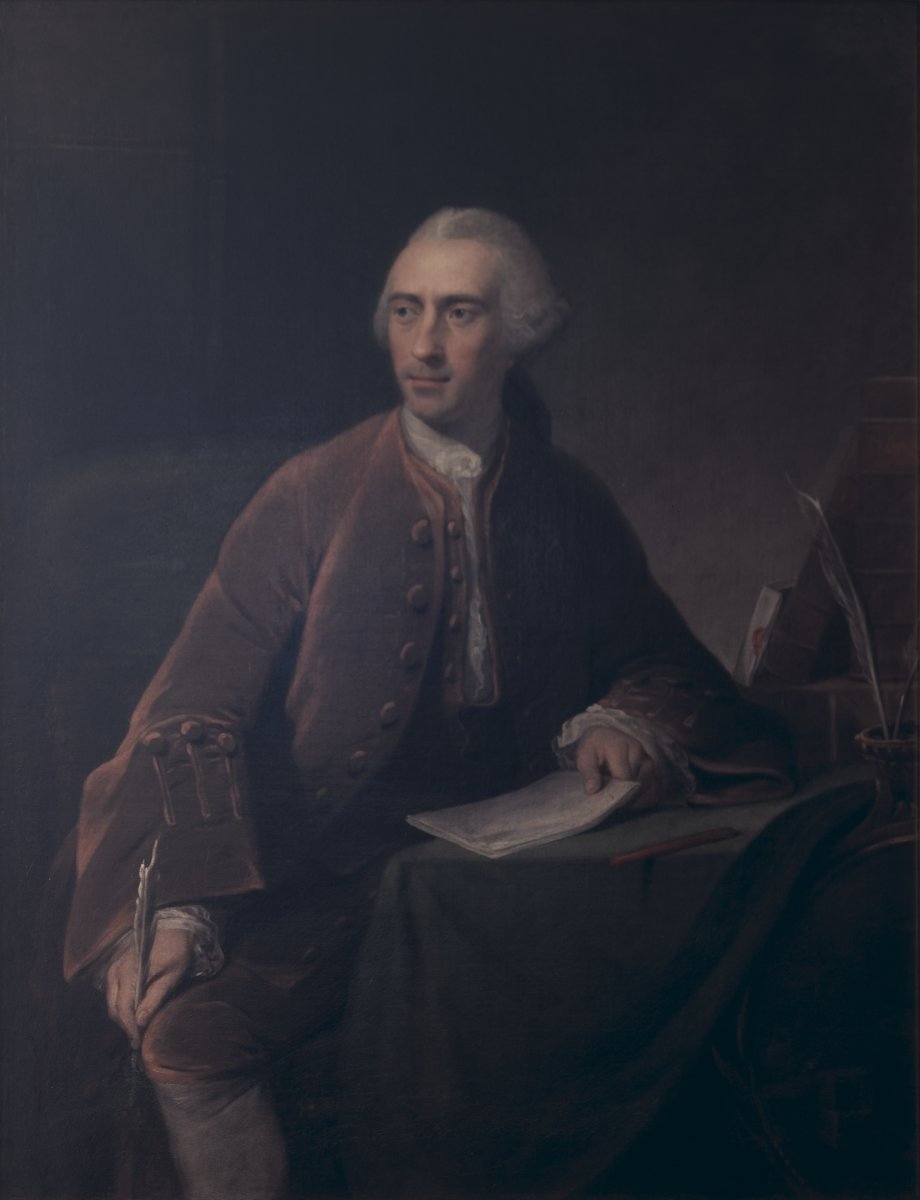
- Portrait by Robert Edge Pine, 1760
- Born: 1720; Ireland
- Died: 1802 (aged 81–82); Hackney, Middlesex
- Occupations: Merchant and political activist
- Spouse: Sarah Hallowell
- Children: 11

Samuel Vaughan (1720–1802) was an Anglo-Irish merchant and political radical.

== Early life ==
Vaughan was born in Ireland, the son of Benjamin Vaughan and Ann Wolf; he was the youngest of a family of 12. He was a merchant and plantation owner, living largely in Jamaica, from 1736 to 1752, when he set up business as a merchant banker at Dunster's Court, Mincing Lane, in the City of London.

== Political activist ==
In politics Vaughan supported John Wilkes. He sent his five sons to Warrington Academy, Benjamin and William being taught by Joseph Priestley, with whom a strong family connection was forged. In early 1769 Vaughan was using his contact with John Seddon of Warrington to circulate Wilkite literature in Lancashire. He also hoped to recruit supporters in Manchester and Liverpool through Seddon. With Joseph Mawbey and others, Vaughan was a founder of the Bill of Rights Society (Society of Gentlemen Supporters of the Bill of Rights). It was a trust giving financial support to Wilkes, and the treasurers were Vaughan, Richard Oliver and John Trevanion (1740–1810). The Society set about dealing with Wilkes's tangled money affairs.

Vaughan belonged to what Benjamin Franklin fondly called the Club of Honest Whigs, which met at St Paul's Coffee House in the cathedral churchyard (see English coffeehouses in the 17th and 18th centuries). His support for the cause of Corsica in 1768 brought him the acquaintance of James Boswell through the Club. Vaughan was a trustee of funds for Corsica, with William Beckford and Barlow Trecothick.

In December 1774 Franklin and Josiah Quincy II stayed with Vaughan at Wanstead in Essex. In the period 1781–2 the parliamentary reformer Christopher Wyvill met radical leaders at Vaughan's house. There resulted a political pact for the following session of parliament, of mutual support between Wyvill and a radical group around Vaughan (including John Jebb, John Horne Tooke, and James Townsend). Vaughan joined the Society for Constitutional Information in the 1780s. Through William Beckford, he met the Earl of Shelburne. When Shelburne became Prime Minister, the Vaughan family influence reached foreign policy, trying to split the United States from their French allies in some ultimately unsuccessful moves of 1782.

The Vaughan family was part of the Newington Green congregation of the dissenting minister Richard Price. Samuel Vaughan was a friend of the elder William Hazlitt, the Unitarian minister. Vaughan's religious views have been described as "free-thinking Unitarian".

== Jamaica and bribery scandal ==
Coat of Arms of Samuel Vaughan

Vaughan purchased in 1765 the post of Clerk to the Supreme Court of Jamaica. In 1769 Vaughan then offered the Duke of Grafton, a government minister, a sum of £5000 to secure a reversion, to hold this official place in the family for three of his sons. Grafton brought a King's Bench case against Vaughan, which resulted in embarrassment to both parties. The prominence of the issue led the campaigning writer Junius to expose a previous sale of office by Grafton. This was the post of Collector of Customs in Exeter, to a Mr. Hine, for which Grafton took £3,500; and the implication was that the money went to a card-sharp.

Vaughan put his side of the case in An Appeal to the Public on Behalf of Samuel Vaughan, Esq. in a fall and impartial Narrative of his Negotiation with the Duke of Grafton; and Grafton dropped the prosecution. Even so, Vaughan's actions appeared to be a political gaffe to some of the political radicals, Vaughan's allies. Anna Laetitia Barbauld, a family friend, wrote a poem complimenting his wife Sarah as a gesture of support.

Some of Vaughan's sons became involved in the plantation business, and its London end Vaughan & Co. Benjamin visited the Colony of Jamaica in the early 1770s, and in parliament in the 1790s defended slavery on the island. William worked in the company, and became prominent in the London Society of West India Merchants. Vaughan himself visited Jamaica again in 1775. The Vaughan estates were Flamstead and Vaughansfield in Saint James Parish, slave-run sugar plantations. Vaughansfield was involved in the Second Maroon War in the neighbouring Trelawny Parish. Samuel Vaughan junior became proprietor of these estates.

== In the United States ==
After the end of the American War of Independence Vaughan made several long stays in the United States. There were three separate visits. Vaughan was accompanied by his family, but sent them home in 1786. He wrote to Richard Price in 1785 of the American principles of government as being "the permanent security of the rights of mankind".

=== Philadelphia and Virginia ===
Vaughan was on good terms with George Washington; Washington wrote to him on 30 November 1785 about gifts of a pamphlet of Mirabeau on the Society of the Cincinnati, and Jamaican rum. They had met in Philadelphia in December 1783. There Vaughan planned the planting of the State House garden, as well as laying out the gardens of Gray's Ferry Tavern in the English style. In Philadelphia also, with Francis Hopkinson, he helped revive the American Philosophical Society, to which Vaughan was elected a member in 1784; and provided a sketch-plan for Philosophical Hall.

As Vaughan explained to Humphry Marshall, he planned to plant the State House Yard with a representative collection of American trees and shrubs. The ambition was a political statement, on the unity of the newly United States, and was shared by Washington and Thomas Jefferson as gardeners. In Philadelphia for the Constitutional Convention during the summer of 1787, Vaughan paid a visit in July to William Bartram's nursery, from which he ordered 55 species of plants. The State House project's greater scope was abandoned, but Vaughan saw to the publication of Marshall's Arbustum Americanum, in 1785. He was elected a Fellow of the American Academy of Arts and Sciences in 1786.

In 1787 also, Vaughan visited Mount Vernon, and drew a plan of the garden. He gave Washington a marble mantelpiece for the house.

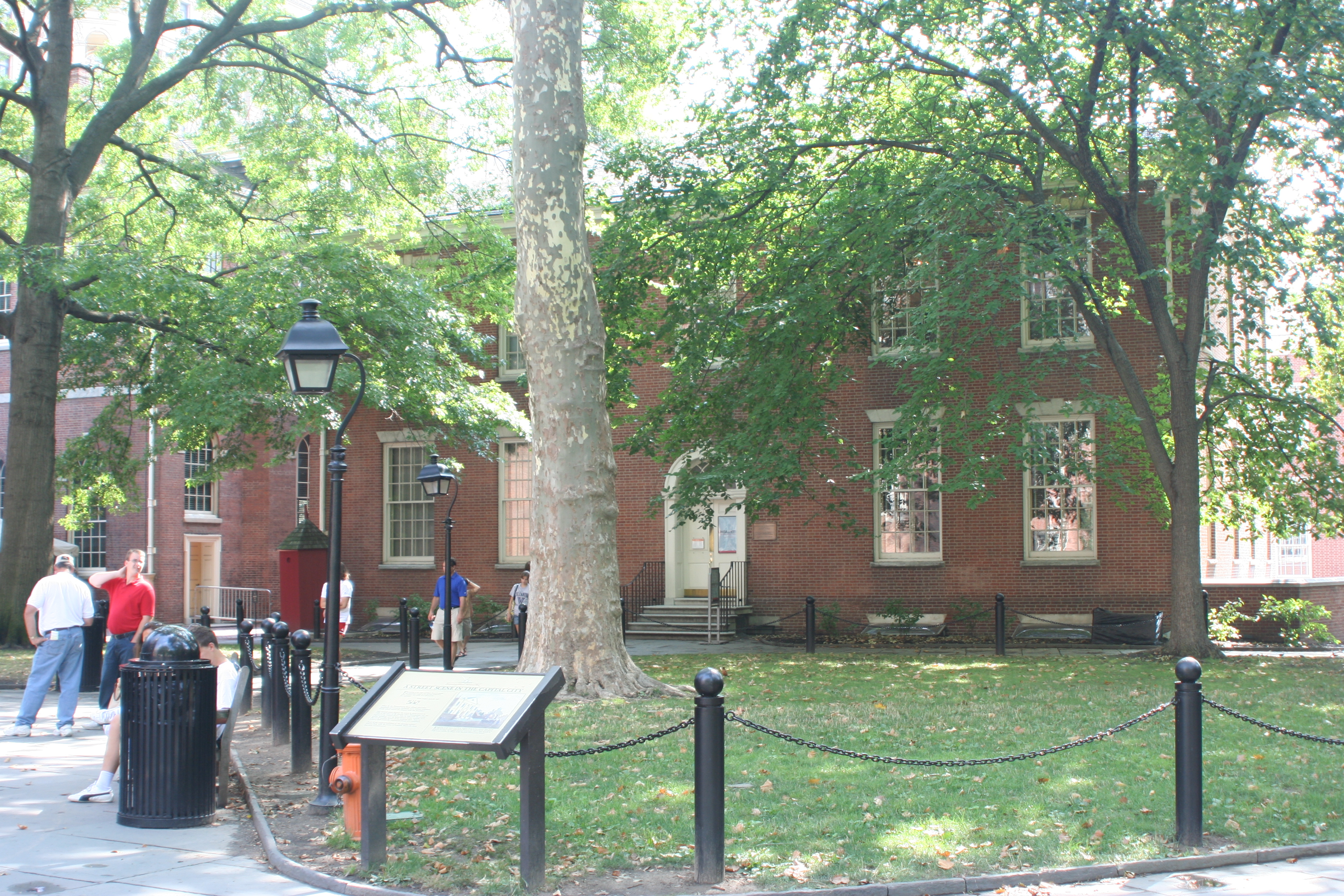
Philosophical Hall, Philadelphia today

=== Maine ===
Vaughan also spent time in Hallowell, Maine, meeting up with William Hazlitt there in the winter of 1784–5. Sarah Vaughan had inherited property on the Kennebec River, from her father, who was a "Kennebeck Proprietor", and also a congregationalist supporter of the Brattle Square Church. Two of the Vaughan sons (Benjamin and Charles) settled there, and another (John, a business partner of Robert Morris) at Philadelphia. Samuel Vaughan in fact intended a religious project in the area, which was put in the hands of Charles, who became a "Kennebeck Proprietor"; but the original aim became muted as Charles's lack of business acumen showed through.

== Later life ==
In 1790, Vaughan attended the funeral of his friend Benjamin Franklin. Shortly after, he returned to London. In 1792, he went to Paris to attend debates of the National Assembly. In 1795, he bought the Vaughan Portrait, one of many portraits of George Washington by Gilbert Stuart.

Vaughan Portrait, a 1795 portrait by Vaughn

== Death ==
Vaughan died in Hackney in Middlesex, England, in 1802.

== Family ==
Vaughan married Sarah Hallowell (1727–1809), daughter of Benjamin Hallowell. They had 11 children in all. Ten lived to be adults. Their sons were:

- Benjamin (1751–1835), married Sarah Manning, sister of William Manning.
- William (1752–1850)
- John (1756–1841)
- Charles (1759–1839), married Frances Western Apthorp, granddaugther of Charles Apthorp.
- Samuel junior (1762–1827)

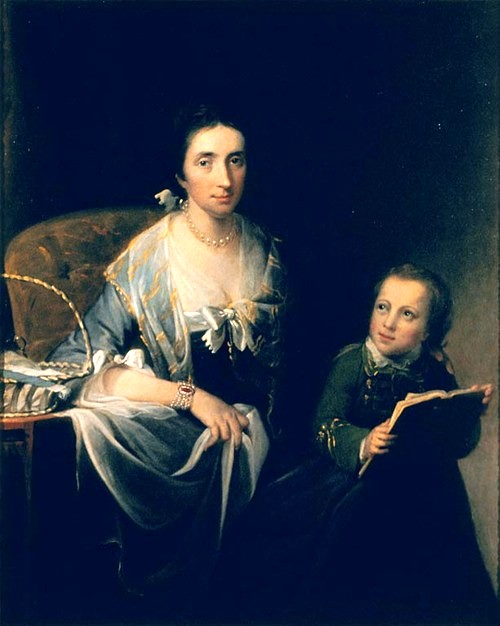
Sarah Hallowell Vaughan

Their daughters were

- Anne, or Ann, who married John Darby and was mother to John Nelson Darby
- Rebecca married John Merrick, and was mother of Samuel Vaughan Merrick.
- Barbara Eddy, Sarah, Hannah.
