= American Philosophical Society =

American scholarly organization and learned society

- American Philosophical Society Hall
- U.S. National Register of Historic Places
- U.S. National Historic Landmark
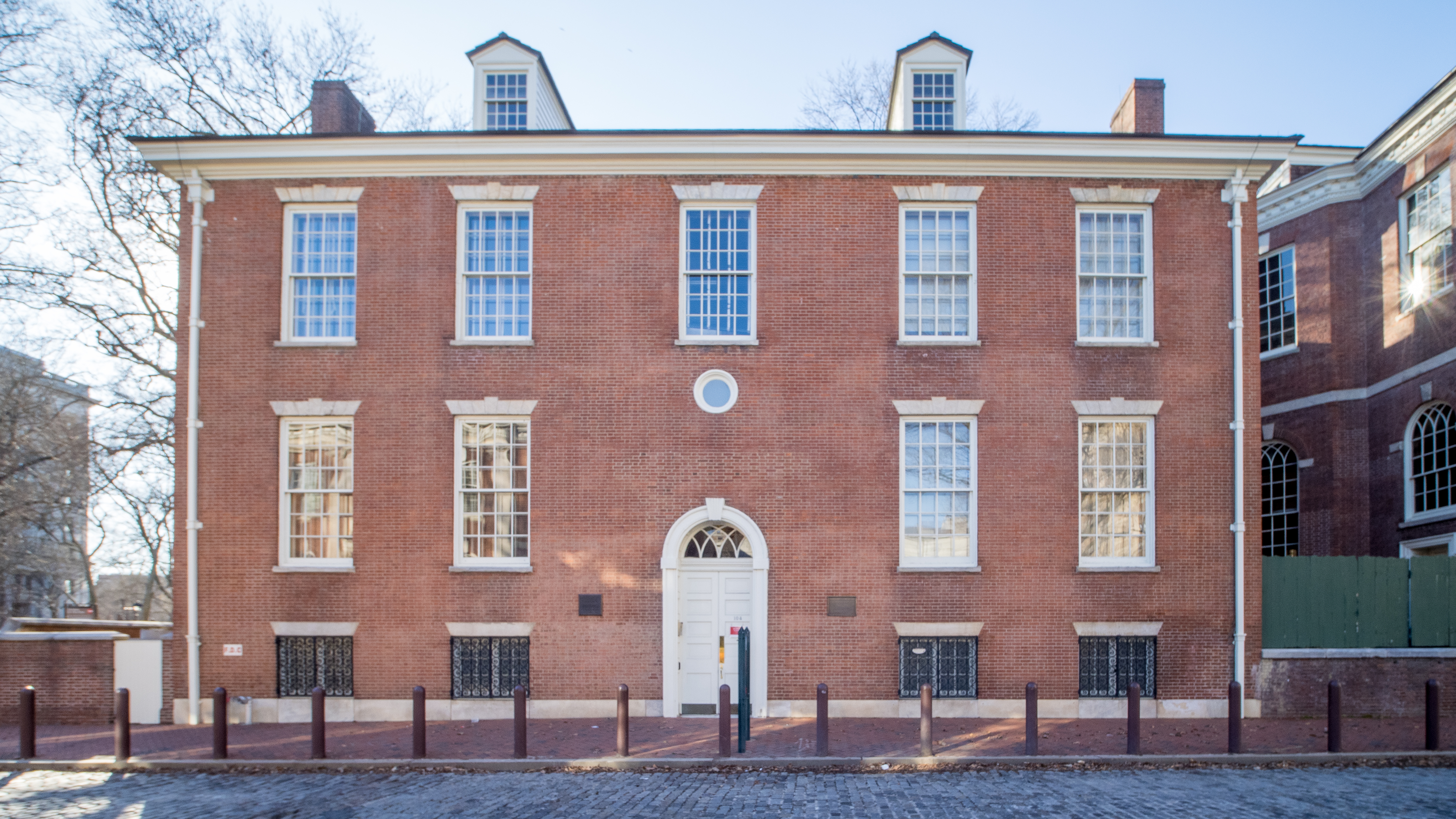
- Philosophical Hall, the headquarters of the American Philosophical Society in Philadelphia

- Location within Philadelphia Location within Pennsylvania Location within the United States
- Location: 104 S. Fifth St., Philadelphia, Pennsylvania, U.S.
- Coordinates: 39°56′55″N 75°8′58″W
- Built: 1787
- Architect: Samuel Vaughan
- Architectural style: Georgian
- Website: amphilsoc.org
- NRHP reference No.: 66000675

Significant dates
- Added to NRHP: January 12, 1965
- Designated NHL: January 12, 1965

The American Philosophical Society (APS) is an American scholarly organization and learned society founded in 1743 in Philadelphia that promotes knowledge in the humanities and natural sciences through research, professional meetings, publications, library resources, and community outreach. It was founded by the polymath Benjamin Franklin and is considered the first learned society founded in what became the United States.

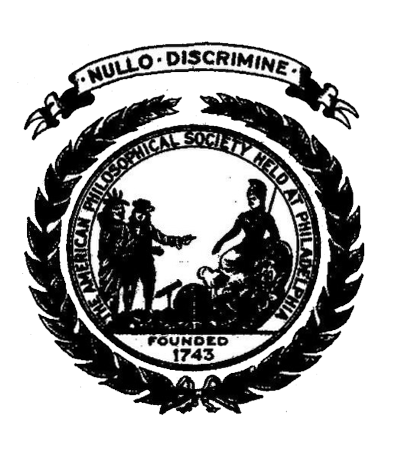
The society's seal

Philosophical Hall, the society's headquarters and a museum, is located just east of Independence Hall in Independence National Historical Park. In 1965, in recognition of the building's history, it was designated a National Historic Landmark.

The society has about 1,000 elected members. As of April 2020, 5,710 members had been inducted since its creation. Through research grants, published journals, the American Philosophical Society Museum, an extensive library, and regular meetings, the society supports a variety of disciplines in the humanities and the sciences.

== History ==
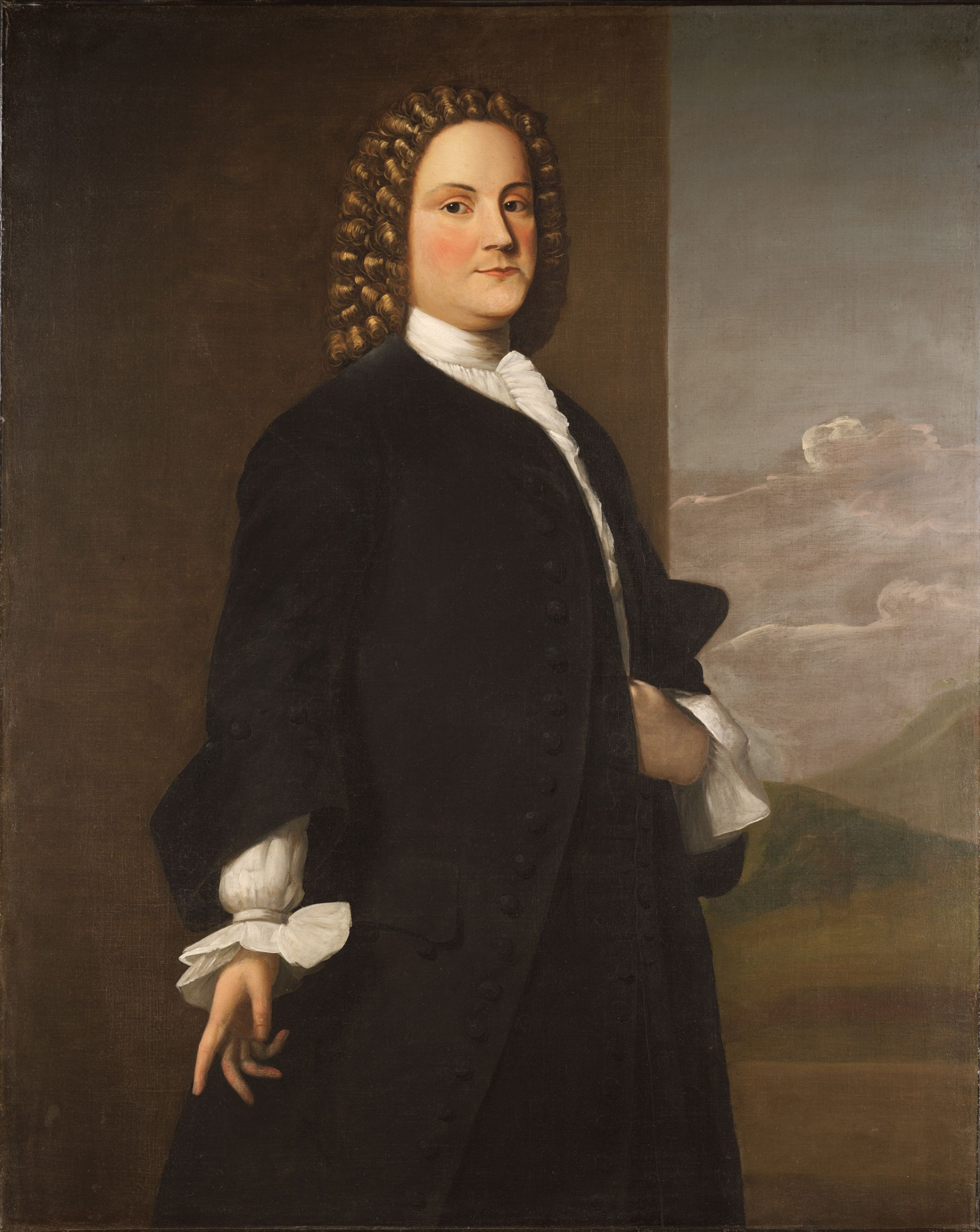
Portrait of Benjamin Franklin by Robert Feke, c. 1746–1750

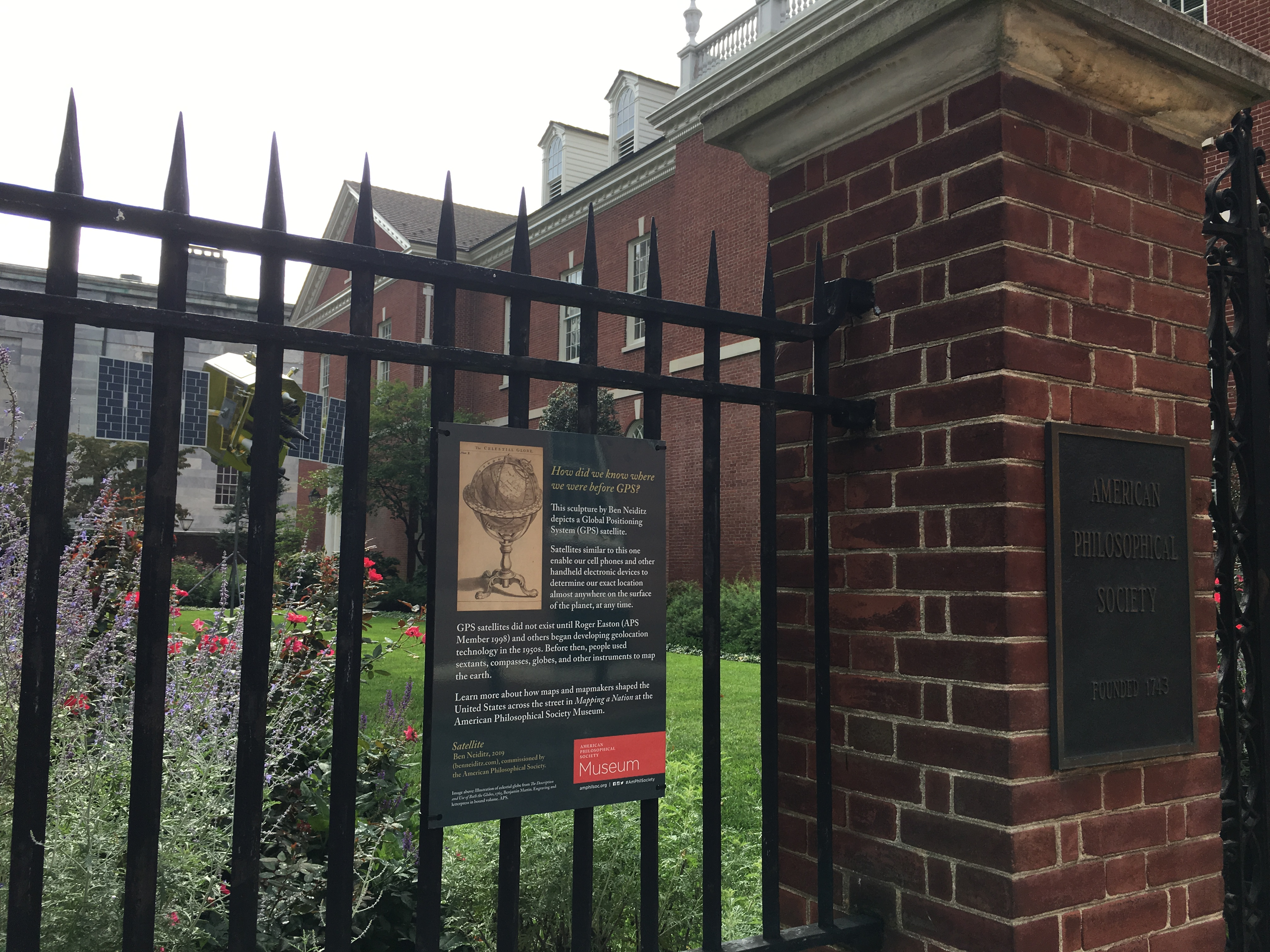
Thomas Jefferson Garden adjacent to Library Hall

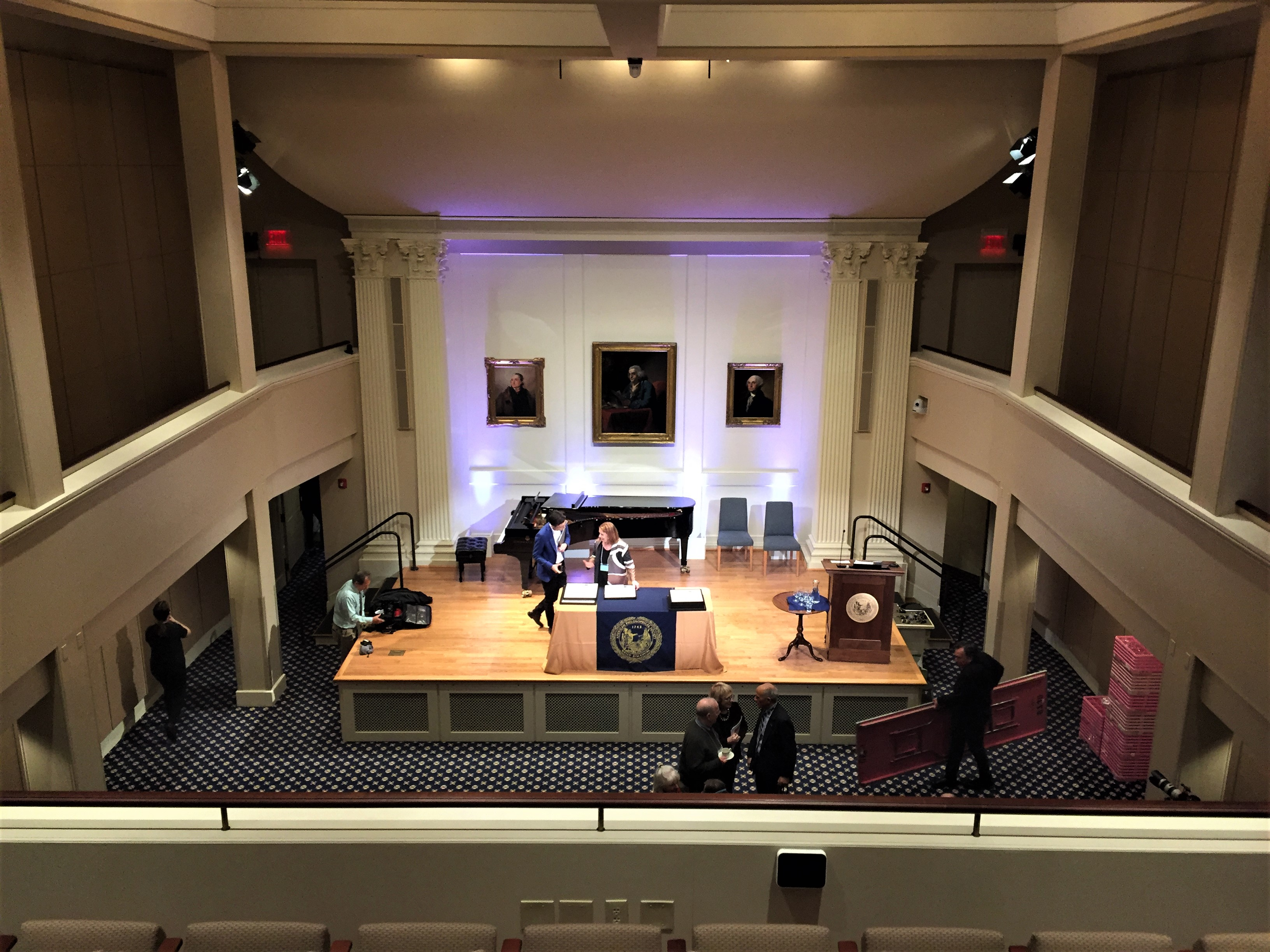
Franklin Hall at the American Philosophical Hall, named for Benjamin Franklin, the organization's founder

The American Philosophical Society was founded as the Philosophical Society in 1743 by Benjamin Franklin, James Alexander, Francis Hopkinson, John Bartram, Philip Syng Jr., and others as an offshoot of an earlier club, the Junto.

Early members included: Benjamin Franklin, John Dickinson, George Washington, John Adams, Thomas Jefferson, Alexander Hamilton, James McHenry, Thomas Paine, David Rittenhouse, Peter Stephen Du Ponceau, Nicholas Biddle, Owen Biddle, Benjamin Rush, James Madison, Michael Hillegas, John Marshall, Charles Pettit, and John Andrews.

It was common at the time for intellectual societies to invite members from around the world, where the society recruited members from other countries, including Alexander von Humboldt, the Marquis de Lafayette, Baron von Steuben, Tadeusz Kościuszko, Peter Jonas Bergius and Princess Dashkova. The society lapsed into inactivity by 1746, but was revived in 1767.

On January 2, 1769, the society united with the American Society for Promoting Useful Knowledge under the name American Philosophical Society Held at Philadelphia for Promoting Useful Knowledge. Franklin was elected the first president. During this time, the society maintained a standing Committee on American Improvements; one of its investigations was to study the prospects for a canal to connect the Chesapeake Bay and the Delaware River. The Chesapeake and Delaware Canal, which had been proposed by Thomas Gilpin, Sr., was built in the 1820s.

Following the American Revolutionary War, the society looked for leadership to Francis Hopkinson, one of the signatories of the United States Declaration of Independence. Under his influence, the society received land from the government of Pennsylvania, along with a plot of land in Philadelphia, where Philosophical Hall now stands.

Charles Darwin, Robert Frost, Louis Pasteur, Elizabeth Cabot Agassiz, John James Audubon, Linus Pauling, Margaret Mead, Woodrow Wilson, Maria Mitchell, and Thomas Edison were all prominent members of the society.

Many members of the Society of the Cincinnati were among the APS's first board members and contributors; the APS and SOC still maintain an informal, collegial relationship.

== Membership ==
Membership of the APS "honors extraordinary accomplishments in all fields." It has about 1,000 elected members, comprising about 840 "resident" members (United States citizens or those working or living in the United States) and about 160 "international" members. As of February 2025 it had elected 5,890 members since its foundation.

Over that history, 220 members have been from Harvard University, 117 from Princeton University, 91 from Stanford University, and 86 from the University of California, Berkeley. Ten academic institutions have each been affiliated with 50 or more members:

Institution	Members (1743–2024)
Harvard	220
Princeton	117
Stanford	91
Berkeley	86
Columbia	76
Chicago	73
Penn	67
Yale	63
MIT	58
NYU	42

Presidents

- 1959-1970 Henry Allen Moe
- 2011-2017 Clyde Barker
- 2017-2023 Linda Greenhouse
- 2023-2029 Roger S. Bagnall

== Awards ==
In 1786, the society established the Magellanic Premium, a prize for achievement in "navigation, astronomy, or natural philosophy," the oldest scientific prize awarded by an American institution, which it still awards. Other awards include the Barzun Prize for cultural history, the Judson Daland Prize for Outstanding Achievement in Clinical Investigation, the Benjamin Franklin Medal for distinguished achievement in the sciences, the Lashley Award for neurobiology, the Lewis Award for the best book published by the society in the year, and the Thomas Jefferson Medal for distinguished achievement in the arts, humanities, or social sciences.

== Publications ==
The society has published the Transactions of the American Philosophical Society since 1771. Five issues appear each year. The Proceedings have appeared since 1838; they publish the papers delivered at the society's biannual meetings. The society has also published The Papers of Benjamin Franklin, Joseph Henry, William Penn, and Meriwether Lewis, and William Clark. Jane Aitken bound 400 volumes for the society.

The society also has an expansive archive on framer of the U.S. constitution John Dickinson.

APS holds the ACLS Collection (American Council of Learned Societies Committee on Native American Languages, American Philosophical Society) which is a collection of indigenous language documents from around the United States including recordings of the Odawa language from northern Michigan. APS has created a guide to help provide broad coverage of the Native American and Indigenous archival collections at the Library & Museum of the American Philosophical Society. These materials date from 1553 to 2020 and include manuscript, audio, and visual materials relating to Indigenous peoples throughout the Americas.

The society also has a collection of manuscripts on the history of the British colonies, Revolutionary War, the history of American science, quantum physics, Charles Darwin and evolution, genetics and the history of technology.

== Buildings ==
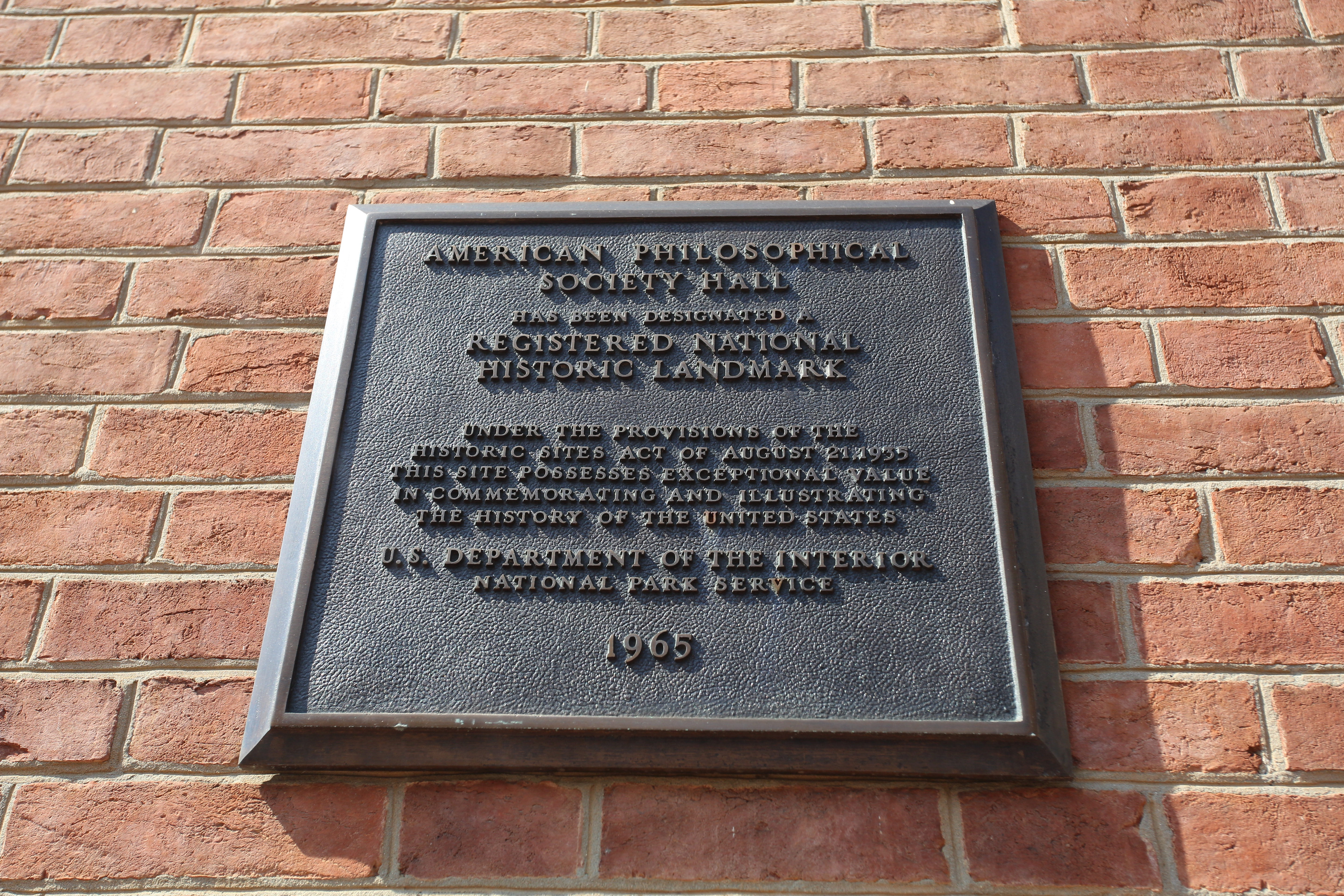
National Historic Landmark Plaque

=== Philosophical Hall ===
Philosophical Hall, at 104 South Fifth Street, Philadelphia, between Chestnut and Walnut Streets, immediately south of Old City Hall, was built in 1785–1789 to house the society and designed by Samuel Vaughan in the Federal style. A third floor was added in 1890 to accommodate the expanding library, but was removed in 1948–1950, when the building was restored to its original appearance for the creation of Independence National Historical Park. In 2001, it was opened to the public as The American Philosophical Society Museum, hosting revolving, thematic exhibitions that explore intersections of history, art, and science. The museum features works of art, scientific instruments, original manuscripts, rare books, natural history specimens, and curiosities of all kinds from the APS's own collections, along with objects on loan from other institutions.

=== Library Hall ===
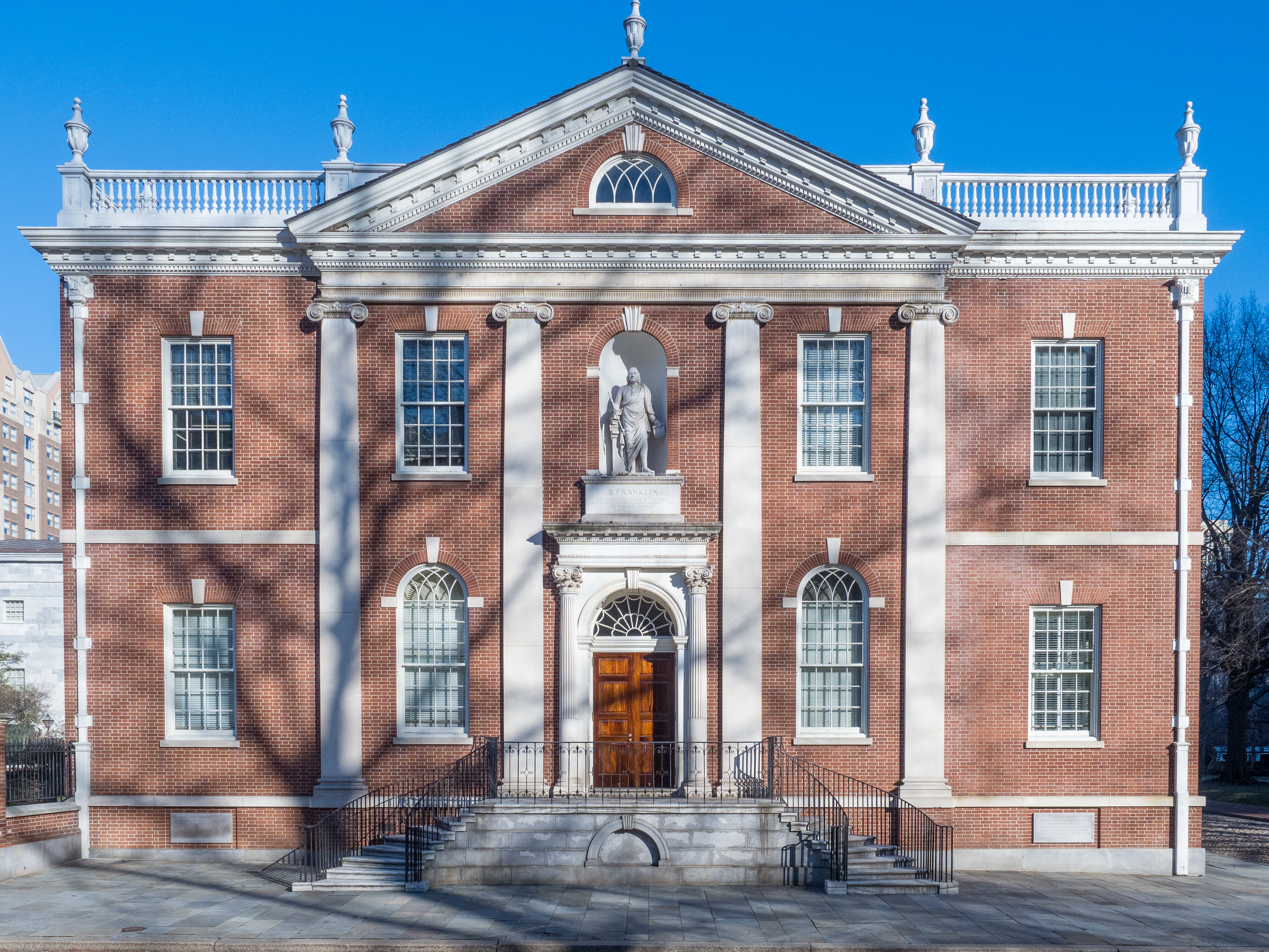
Library Hall (built 1789-90, demolished 1880s) was recreated on its original site in 1958.

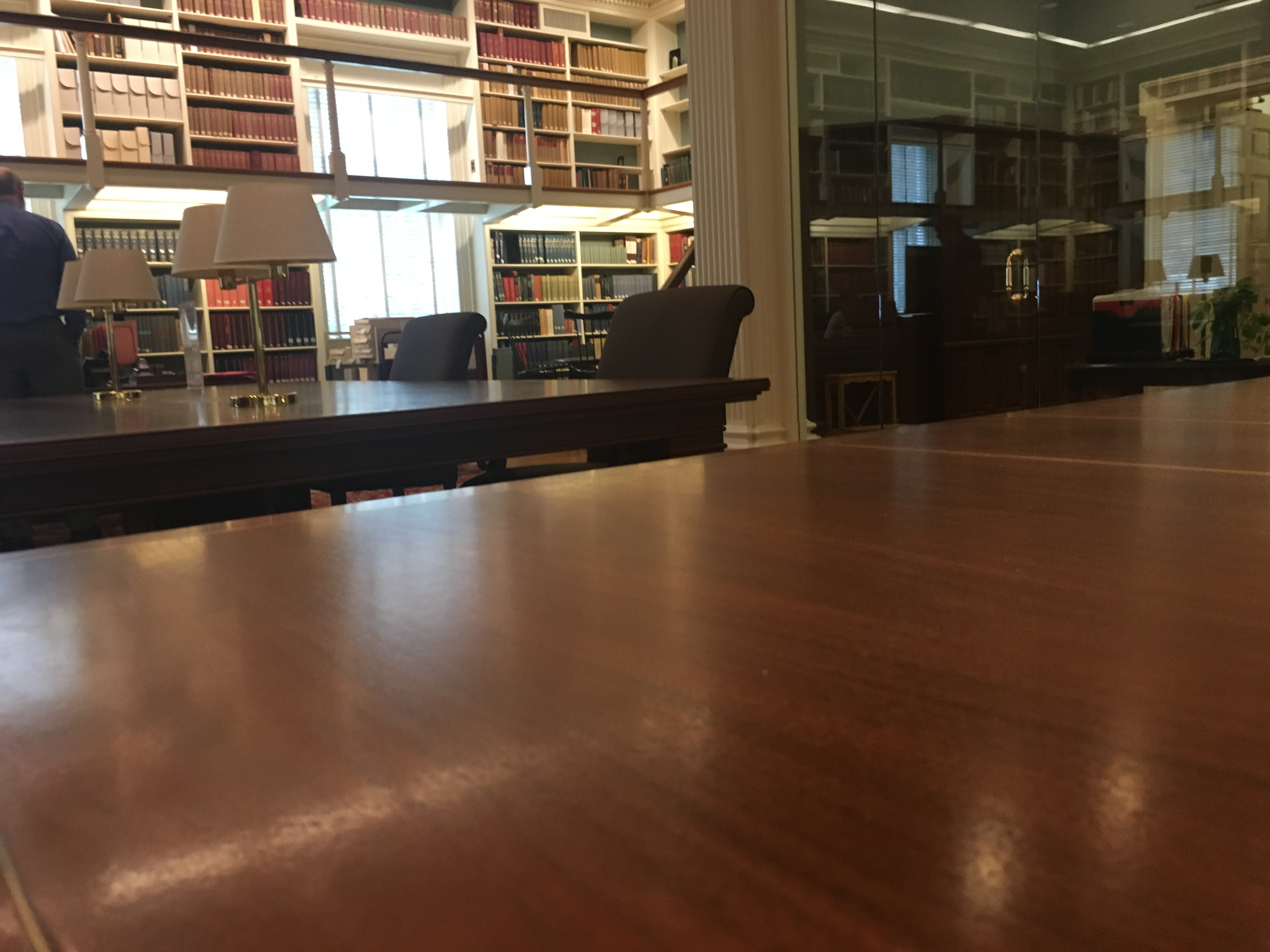
Reading room for researchers at Library Hall in 2019

In 1789–90, the Library Company of Philadelphia (LCP)—now located at 1314 Locust Street, Philadelphia—built its headquarters, Library Hall, directly across 5th Street from APS. In 1884, LCP sold its building, which was demolished for the expansion of the Drexel & Company Building in 1887. The bank building was itself demolished in the 1950s, during the creation of Independence National Historical Park.

In 1958, APS built a new library building on the site, that recreated the façade of LCP's Library Hall.

=== Benjamin Franklin Hall ===
APS restored the former Farmers' & Mechanics' Bank building at 425–29 Chestnut Street, which was built in 1854–55 to the design of John M. Gries in the Italianate style, to serve as a lecture hall. It is the site of meetings and most major events the society hosts.

=== Richardson Hall ===
Constance C. and Edgar P. Richardson Hall at 431 Chestnut Street, immediately west of Benjamin Franklin Hall, is the former Pennsylvania Company for Insurances on Lives and Granting Annuities Building, which was built between 1871 and 1873 and designed by Addison Hutton. It contains offices and the Consortium for History of Science, Technology and Medicine.

== Gallery ==
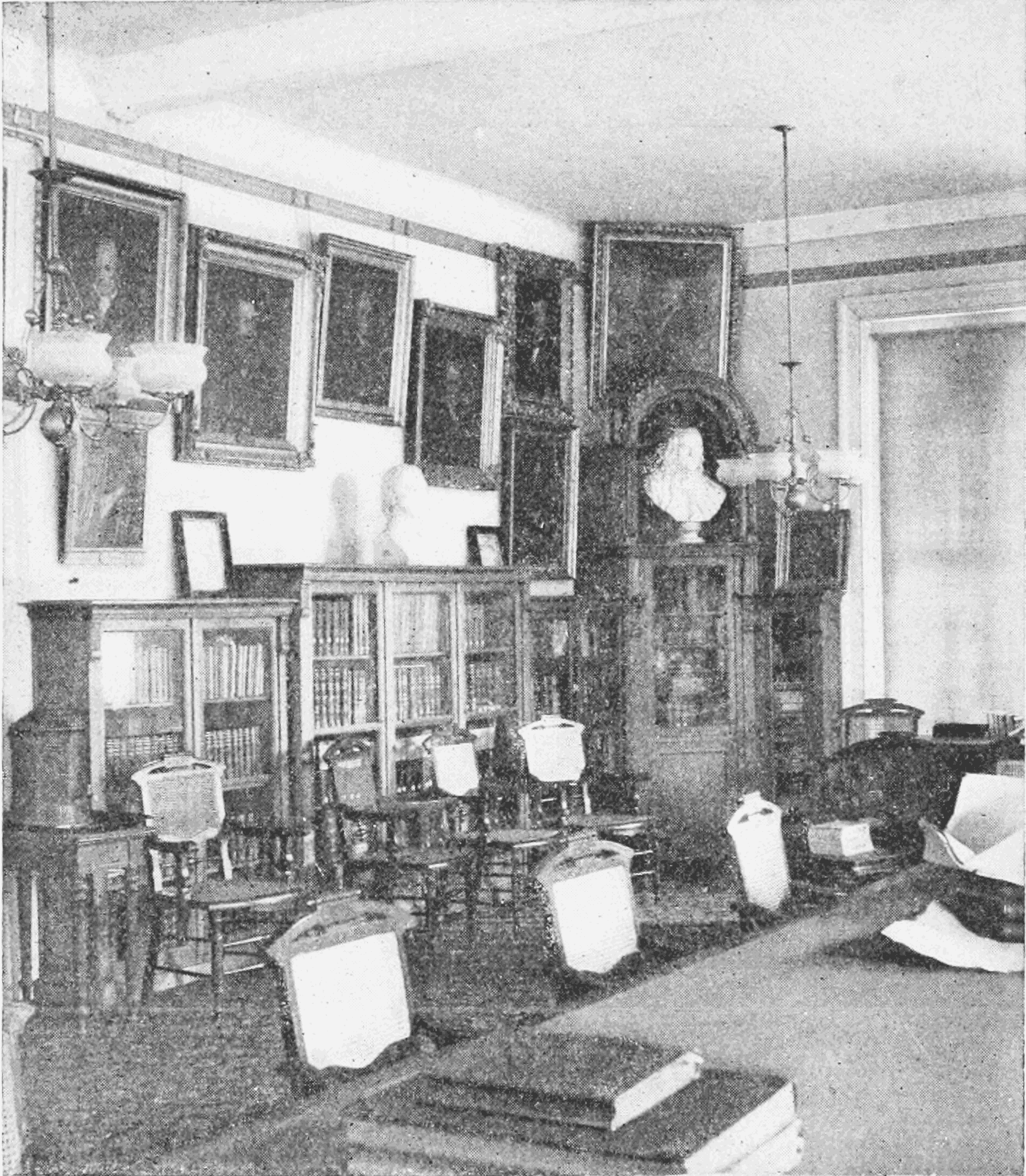
Interior of Philosophical Hall, c. 1901–02

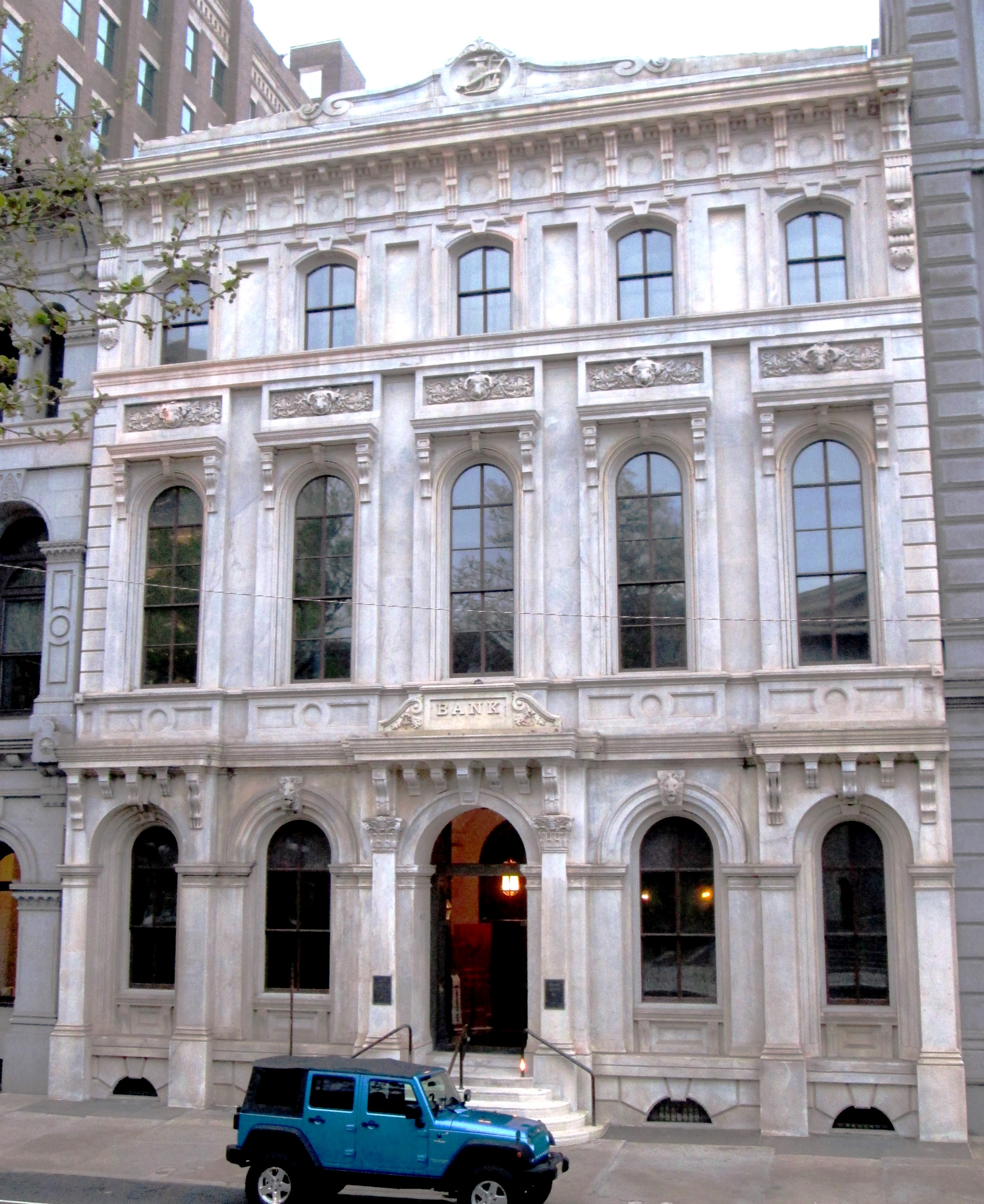
Benjamin Franklin Hall in 2013

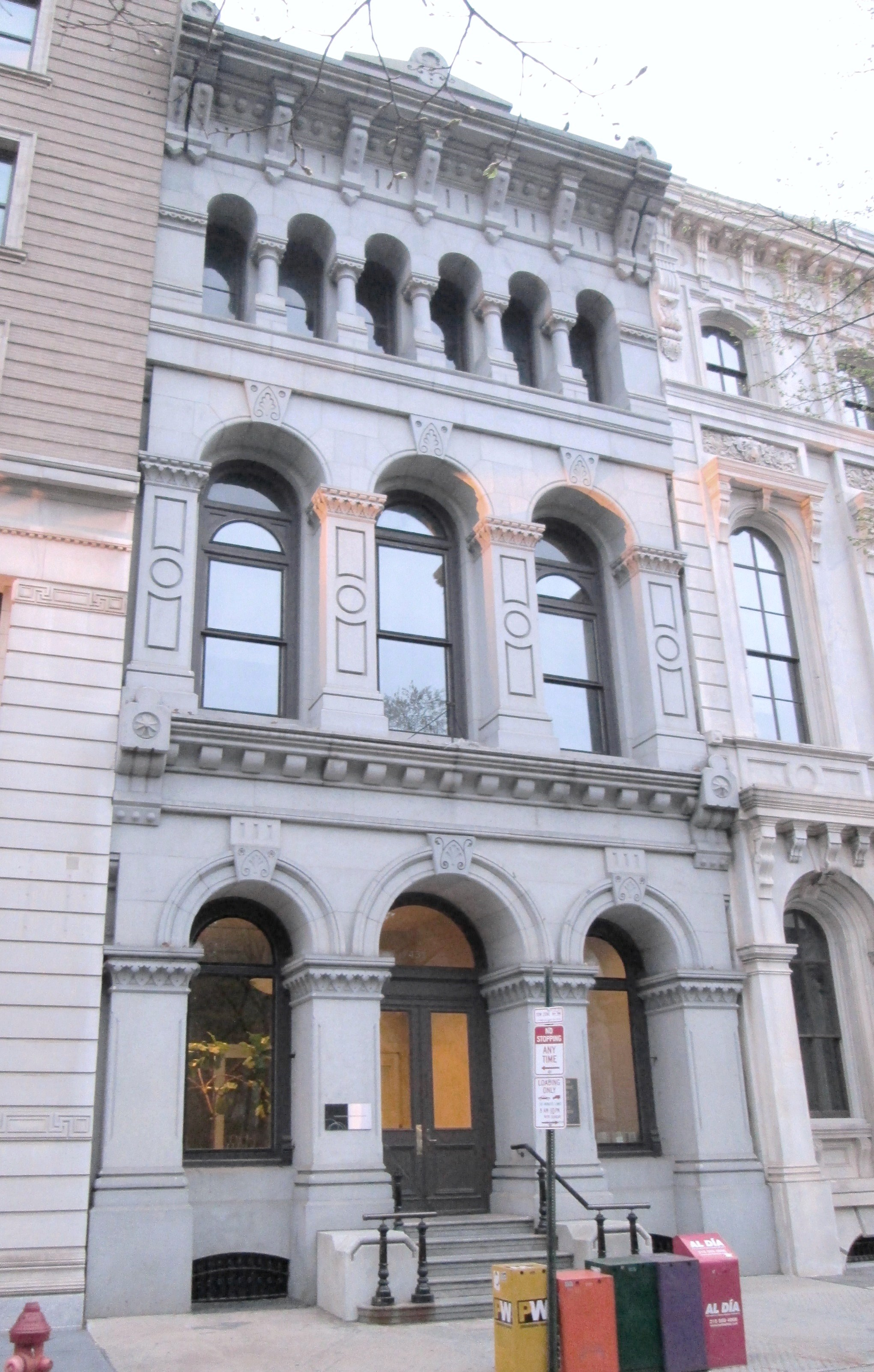
Richardson Hall in 2013

== General and cited sources ==
- James, Edward T. (1971). Notable American Women, 1607–1950: A Biographical Dictionary. Harvard University Press. p. 26. ISBN 978-0-674-62734-5.
