= List of paintings of George Washington =

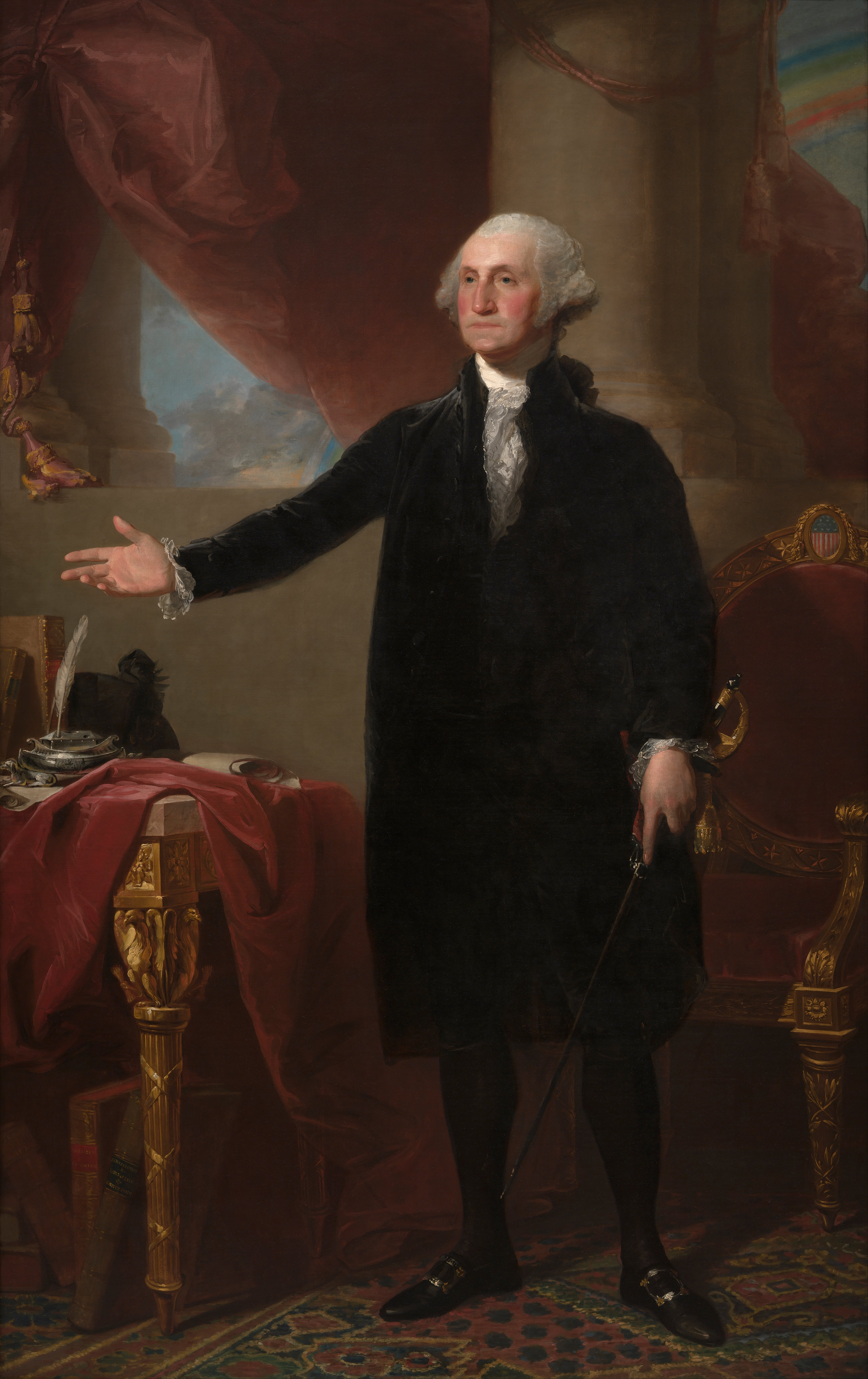
Lansdowne Portrait, c. 1796

George Washington was a Founding Father, general of the Continental Army, and first president of the United States from 1789 to 1797. The oil paintings below depict George Washington as their principal subject, ranging from Charles Willson Peale's George Washington as Colonel in the Virginia Regiment (1772) to Titus Kaphar's Shadows of Liberty (2016), focusing primarily on original paintings rather than reproductions. Washington was painted several times in the 18th and 19th centuries and is still regularly painted in modern times.

Artists such as Gilbert Stuart, John Trumbull, and Charles Willson Peale were famous for painting Washington and establishing his presence in American art. The paintings of Washington can reflect different aspects of his life, such as the Lansdowne Portrait, which depicts Washington's final year as president of the United States. These paintings also helped build Washington's public image, as they represented leadership to the young nation as well as his transformation from a military general to the leader of a nation; they also became influential to other painters.

For example, Stuart's Athenaeum Portrait (1796) became one of the most widely reproduced paintings of Washington, becoming a model for other copies; a copy of the painting later inspired the engraving on the United States one-dollar bill. Trumbull popularized painting Washington as general of the Continental Army during the American Revolutionary War. Peale painted the first known portrait of Washington and titled it George Washington as Colonel in the Virginia Regiment (1772).

The Prayer at Valley Forge, painted by Arnold Friberg, became prominent during Donald Trump's second presidency and sparked debates about whether the United States was birthed as a Christian nation. It also gained the love of conservative Christians and became a symbol of Christianity in the United States. Overall paintings of Washington have played a significant role in building his public image, shaping American culture, and establishing his image as an icon of the founding of the United States.

== Portraits ==
Image	Title	Artist	Date	Location	Ref.
An oil painting showing George Washington wearing his colonel's uniform at the Virginia Regiment during the French and Indian War	George Washington as Colonel in the Virginia Regiment	Charles Willson Peale	1772	Washington and Lee University	
An oil painting showing George Washington wearing his uniform with his right hand resting on a sword and his left hand inside the shirt under his jacket	George Washington	Charles Willson Peale	1776	White House Historical Association	
An oil painting showing George Washington after the battle of Princeton in 1777 in a uniform with his left hand on a cannon	Washington at Princeton	Charles Willson Peale	1779	Pennsylvania Academy of the Fine Arts	
An oil painting showing George Washington standing near his enslaved servant William Lee. Washington is overlooking the Hudson River in New York	George Washington (Note: Also titled George Washington and William Lee)	John Trumbull	1780	Metropolitan Museum of Art	
An oil painting showing George Washington in his uniform during the American Revolutionary.	Portrait of George Washington	Joseph Wright	1783	Unknown	
An oil painting showing George Washington during the battle of Princeton in his uniform. He is holding a sword in his right hand with his left hand behind his back. Behind Washington are soldiers, one raising the American flag, one wounded and the other one on his knees.	George Washington at the Battle of Princeton	Charles Willson Peale	1784	Princeton University Art Museum	
An oil painting showing George Washington in his uniform. Behind him are soldiers wheeling a cannon through a field	George Washington	Joseph Wright	1784	Philadelphia History Museum	
An oil painting showing George Washington in blue with his head tilted, looking to the far left of the canvas	George Washington	Robert Edge Pine	1785	National Portrait Gallery, Washington, DC	
An oil painting showing George Washington in his uniform looking directly at the viewer. The background has a mix of gold with black	George Washington	John Trumbull	1786	Massachusetts Historical Society	
An oil painting showing George Washington in his Continental Army military uniform	George Washington	James Peale	1787	United States Army Center of Military History	
An oil painting showing George Washington in a navy and gold uniform	George Washington	Edward Savage	1789	Harvard Art Museums	
A cropped oil painting of George Washington	George Washington	Christian Gullager	1789	Massachusetts Historical Society	
An oil painting showing George Washington standing next to a white horse. Washington has his right hand on the back of the horse as it's looking down.	George Washington (Note: Also titled Washington and the Departure of the British Garrison from New York City)	John Trumbull	1790	Unknown	
An oil painting showing George Washington at Verplanck's Point with his right hand on a white horse as it's looking down.	Washington at Verplanck's Point	John Trumbull	1790	Winterthur Museum, Garden and Library	
An oil painting showing George Washington in his uniform during the American Revolutionary War. Behind Washington is a green background that fades to black.	George Washington	Charles Peale Polk	1790	Metropolitan Museum of Art	
An oil painting showing George Washington in his uniform holding the hilt of his sword in his right hand. Behind Washington is a town.	George Washington at Princeton	Charles Peale Polk	1790	Corcoran Gallery of Art	
An oil painting showing the side profile of George Washington in his uniform during the American Revolutionary War. Behind Washington is a dark brown background.	George Washington	Joseph Wright	1790	Cleveland Museum of Art	
An oil painting showing George Washington at Trenton, New Jersey; a white horse is attacking a person behind Washington.	General George Washington at Trenton	John Trumbull	1792	Yale University Art Gallery	
An oil painting showing George Washington in the city of Charleston next to his horse	Washington at the City of Charleston	John Trumbull	1792	Charleston City Hall	
An oil painting showing George Washington before the Battle of Trenton standing next to a brown horse	George Washington before the Battle of Trenton	John Trumbull	1792–1794	The American Wing	
An oil painting showing George Washington's body facing to the right of the canvas with Washington himself staring at something not visible in the painting.	George Washington	John Trumbull	1793	Unknown	
An oil painting showing George Washington looking directly at the viewer with his body facing to the far right of the canvas. Behind Washington is a wine-red background that fades into black.	Vaughan Portrait	Gilbert Stuart	1795	National Gallery of Art, Washington, D.C.	
An oil painting showing George Washington looking directly at the viewer. The background behind him is a vermilion color with black edges.	Vaughan-Sinclair portrait	Gilbert Stuart	1795	National Gallery of Art, Washington, D.C.	
An oil painting showing George Washington facing to the far right of the canvas, looking directly at the viewer. Behind Washington is a green curtain; you can also see parts of the environment outside.	Gibbs-Channing-Avery Portrait	Gilbert Stuart	1795	Metropolitan Museum of Art	
An oil painting variant of the Gibbs-Channing-Avery portrait, except instead of Washington wearing black, he is wearing a brownish-orange color, with his collar buttons being gold. The background is much more saturated, and Washington appears pale.	George Washington	Gilbert Stuart	1795	Frick Collection	
An oil painting showing George Washington facing to the far left of the canvas. Washington is wearing black, and behind him is a wine red background.	George Washington	Rembrandt Peale	1795	National Portrait Gallery, Washington, D.C.	
An oil painting showing George Washington facing to the far left of the canvas. Washington is wearing black, and behind him is a brown background that fades into black.	George Washington	Charles Willson Peale	1795	Collection of the New York Historical Society, New York	
An oil painting showing George Washington's body facing to the left while Washington himself is looking directly at the viewer. Washington is wearing black.	George Washington	Adolf Ulrik Wertmüller	1795	Metropolitan Museum of Art	
An oil painting showing George Washington's side profile	George Washington	James Sharples	1796	National Portrait Gallery, Washington, D.C.	
An oil painting showing George Washington pointing towards a table with a red cloth and gold leg. Washington stands tall and straight. There is also a window showing land behind him.	Lansdowne Portrait	Gilbert Stuart	1796	National Portrait Gallery, Washington, D.C.	
A full-length oil painting of George Washington	George Washington	Gilbert Stuart	1796	Brooklyn Museum	
An oil painting showing George Washington pointing towards a table with his right hand, with his left hand resting on a stone statue. Washington stands tall and straight. There is also a window showing an ocean with a ship behind him.	Portrait of George Washington	Giuseppe Pirovani	1796	Royal Academy of Fine Arts of San Fernando	
This painting, called the Athenaeum Portrait, shows the original unfinished painting. The bottom half of George Washington, the sitter, is missing as well as his arms and hands.	Athenaeum Portrait	Gilbert Stuart	1796	Museum of Fine Arts, Boston	
An oil painting showing George Washington wearing a black velvet suit. Washington is looking off to the far right of the canvas, with his body titled to the far right too. The background is gold that fades to black.	George Washington	Edward Savage	1796	National Gallery of Art	
An oil painting showing George Washington pointing towards a table with a red cloth and gold leg. Washington stands tall and straight. There is also a window showing land behind him.	George Washington	Gilbert Stuart	1797	White House	
An oil painting of George Washington in a suit at his studio in Philadelphia. Washington has a sword resting on his lap	Constable-Hamilton Portrait	Gilbert Stuart	1797	Crystal Bridges Museum of American Art	
An oil painting variant of the Portrait of George Washington by Thomas Sully. This copy appears more detailed and less cartoonish.	Munro-Lenox Portrait	Gilbert Stuart	1797	National Portrait Gallery, London	
An oil painting variant of the Athenaeum Portrait that appears to be a finished version of the original, unfinished painting. The background has a gold hue that fades into black. George Washington is wearing black.	George Washington	Gilbert Stuart	1803	Unknown	
An oil painting of George Washington at Dorchester Heights. Washington is looking off to the far left of the canvas while gripping his horse with his left hand. The horse is looking behind it from the left.	Washington at Dorchester Heights	Gilbert Stuart	1806	Museum of Fine Arts, Boston	
An oil painting showing George Washington standing by a red table and chair with his right hand on a piece of paper and his left griping a sword	Portrait of George Washington	Thomas Sully	1820	Minneapolis Institute of Art	
An oil painting showing George Washington looking directly at the viewer. The background has a gold hue that fades to black	George Washington	Gilbert Stuart	1821	National Gallery of Art	
An oil painting showing George Washington sitting down at a red table with his right hand on a piece of paper and his left hand resting in his lap.	Portrait of George Washington	Gilbert Stuart	1822	Louvre Abu Dhabi	
An oil painting of George Washington inside a stone case that says Patriae Pater	George Washington, Patriae Pater	Rembrandt Peale	1824	Pennsylvania Academy of the Fine Arts	
An oil painting showing George Washington on a horse before arriving at Yorktown	Washington before Yorktown	Rembrandt Peale	1824	National Gallery of Art	
An oil painting of George Washington wearing a black velvet suit. The background is a dark gold that fades into black.	George Washington (1732-1799)	Unidentified artist	1820–1830	Harvard Art Museums	
An oil painting showing George Washington with his right hand resting on a table and his left hand on his hip. Washington is looking directly at the viewer.	Portrait of George Washington	John Vanderlyn	1834	United States Capitol	
An oil painting showing George Washington in his uniform	George Washington	Léon Cogniet	1836	Unknown	
An oil painting showing George Washington riding a brown horse while holding a black hat in his right hand. In the background a battle is taking place	General George Washington	Thomas Sully	1842	Private collection	
An oil painting in a stone oval frame showing George Washington in his uniform during the American Revolutionary War	George Washington	Rembrandt Peale	1846	Metropolitan Museum of Art	
An oil painting showing George Washington as commander-in-chief of the Continental Army.	General George Washington	Rembrandt Peale	1850	De Young Museum	
This painting called "Portrait of George Washington Taking the Salute at Trenton" shows George Washington at a halt on a white horse. The horse has his right leg lifted slightly in the air. Washington is pointing his sword to the far left of the canvas; he is also looking in the same direction.	Portrait of George Washington Taking the Salute at Trenton	John Faed	1856	Tuscaloosa Museum of Art	
An oil painting of George Washington in his military uniform	George Washington	Rembrandt Peale	1859	Andrew W. Mellon Collection	
An oil painting showing George Washington in his studio gripping his sword with his left hand and his right hand resting on his desk.	George Washington	Luis Cadena	1877	White House Historical Association	
	Shadows of Liberty	Titus Kaphar	2016	Yale University Art Gallery	

=== Group portraits ===
Image	Title	Artist	Date	Location	Ref.
An oil painting showing George Washington with Marquis de Lafayette and Tench Tilghman	Washington, Lafayette & Tilghman	Charles Willson Peale	1784	Maryland State Archives	
An oil painting of George Washington, his wife Martha Washington, two of Martha Washington's grandchildren, and a Black servant. All the Washingtons are sitting at a table while the Black servant is standing behind Martha Washington.	The Washington Family	Edward Savage	1789	National Gallery of Art	

== History paintings ==
Image	Title	Artist	Date	Location	Ref.
An oil painting showing General George Washington aiding the wounded Johann Rall	The Capture of the Hessians at Trenton, December 26, 1776	John Trumbull	1786	Yale University Art Gallery	
An oil painting showing George Washington riding on a horse while reviewing the Western Army	Washington Reviewing the Western Army at Fort Cumberland, Maryland	Frederick Kemmelmeyer	After 1795	Metropolitan Museum of Art	
An oil painting showing George Washington on a white horse passing Delaware with his Continental Army	The Passage of the Delaware	Thomas Sully	1819	Museum of Fine Arts, Boston	
An oil painting showing George Washington resigning his commission as commander-in-chief of the Continental Army to the Congress of the Confederation. About 30 people are standing around Washington on the main floor and on the upper gallery	General George Washington Resigning His Commission	John Trumbull	1824	United States Capitol rotunda	
An oil painting showing George Washington and Marquis de Lafayette standing outside an officer’s tent	The Siege of Yorktown	Auguste Couder	1836	Museum of the American Revolution	
George Washington and Martha Custis getting married	The Marriage of Washington to Martha Custis	Junius Brutus Stearns	1849	Virginia Museum of Fine Arts	
An oil painting showing George Washington crossing the icy Delaware river with his Continental Army	Washington Crossing the Delaware	Emanuel Leutze	1851	Metropolitan Museum of Art	
An oil painting showing George Washington in his final days. Washington is in a white robe lying on his bed surrounded by family and friends, some of whom are kneeling by his side and some are standing over him.	Washington on His Deathbed	Junius Brutus Stearns	1851	Dayton Art Institute	
An oil painting showing George Washington crossing the Delaware River	Washington Crossing the Delaware	George Caleb Bingham	1856	Chrysler Museum of Art	
An oil painting showing George Washington in the Maryland State House resigning his commission as commander-in-chief of the Continental Army.	Washington Resigning His Commission	Edwin White	1858	Maryland State House	
An oil painting showing George Washington and Marquis de Lafayette having a conversation at Mount Vernon.	Washington and Lafayette at Mount Vernon, 1784 (The Home of Washington after the War)	Thomas Prichard Rossiter Louis Rémy Mignot	1859	Metropolitan Museum of Art	
An oil painting showing George Washington arriving to New York City via a boat.	The Arrival of George Washington at New York City, April 30, 1789	Arsène-Hippolyte Rivey	1870	New York Historical	
An oil painting showing George Washington delivering his inaugural address from a balcony to a crowd of people while others, such as Founding Fathers stand around him.	General Washington Delivering His Inaugural Address to New York, April 30, 1789	Ramón de Elorriaga	1889	Federal Hall	
An oil painting showing George Washington and Marquis de Lafayette riding on horses	Washington and Lafayette at Valley Forge	John Ward Dunsmore	1907	Unknown	
An oil painting showing George Washington dancing with Mrs. Henry Willis of Fredericksburg	The Victory Ball, 1781	Jean Leon Gerome Ferris	1929	Virginia Historical Society	
An oil painting of George Washington on a white horse with his right hand in the air holding a black hat. Washington is looking at the ground while riding through it	Reception to Washington on April 21, 1789, at Trenton on his way to New York to Assume the Duties of the Presidency of the United States	N. C. Wyeth	1930	Thomas Edison State University	
An oil painting showing George Washington and other Founding Fathers in the Independence Hall during the signing of the United States Constitution	Scene at the Signing of the Constitution of the United States	Howard Chandler Christy	1940	United States Capitol	
An oil painting showing George Washington as a land surveyor surveying land from a cliff.	George Washington, surveyor	Henry Hintermeister	1948	Unknown	
	Washington Crossing the Delaware	Larry Rivers	1953	Museum of Modern Art	
An oil painting showing George Washington praying in the snow next to his horse	The Prayer at Valley Forge	Arnold Friberg	1975	Museum of the Bible	

== See also ==
- Art in the White House
- Cultural depictions of George Washington
- List of paintings of John Adams
- List of paintings of Thomas Jefferson
- List of statues of George Washington
