= Lieven Bertels =

Belgian musicologist, curator

Lieven Bertels (born 1971) is a Belgian musicologist, curator and impresario.

== Education and early career ==
Born in Hasselt, Bertels received a master's degree in musicology from the University of Leuven (Belgium), followed by a master's degree in Production and Composition from Durham University (Collingwood College). He subsequently engaged in PhD research on Mimesis in Music Recording at Surrey University (UK), whilst working as a Tonmeister and record producer.

== RITCS Film, Radio and TV School ==
From 1994, Bertels started lecturing at the RITCS (then RITS) Film, Radio and TV School in Brussels, teaching subjects including audio technology, music recording, audio art, sound for animation movies and acoustics. He continued to teach at RITCS until his departure to Australia in 2011.

== VRT and Concertgebouw Brugge ==
Since 1998, Bertels worked as a researcher and producer for Belgian national broadcaster VRT, both for the cultural TV Channel Canvas and for Cultural radio channel Klara (formerly Radio 3). In 2001 Bertels was invited to become the first artistic director of the Concertgebouw Brugge (Bruges, Belgium), a new multi-room arts venue purpose-built for Bruges 2002 European Capital of Culture. Bertels' programming was noticed for its eclectic mix of genres and artists, which pushed the Concertgebouw on the international stage with coproductions including Heiner Goebbels. London Sinfonietta and Warp DJs, and permanent installations by Edgard Varèse and Dirk Braeckman.

== Holland Festival ==
From 2004 to 2011, Lieven Bertels worked for the Holland Festival as an artistic coordinator under festival director Pierre Audi. He was responsible for music programming and visual arts collaborations including projects with Devendra Banhart, Anohni, John Baldessari, Laurie Anderson and Mike Patton. From 2010 to 2016, Lieven Bertels served on the board of directors of the International Society for the Performing Arts (ISPA) in New York.

== Sydney Festival and Leeuwarden 2018 ==
From 2012 to 2016, Bertels was the Festival Director at Sydney Festival, the largest arts festival in the southern hemisphere. His tenure brought a return to large-scale open-air installations including Florentijn Hofman's Giant Rubber Duck or Jeremy Deller's Sacrilege, alongside an expanded festival village in Sydney's Hyde Park which included Spiegeltents and outdoor entertainment. His performing arts program included opera, contemporary dance and theatre and indie music from around the globe with artists including Rokia Traore, Peter Sellars, Thalia Theatre Hamburg, Vivienne Westwood, Anne Teresa De Keersmaeker, James Thierrée, Gotye, Joanna Newsom and The Flaming Lips. Over his four-year tenure, Bertels turned the festival from annual financial losses to a budgetary surplus. In 2015, Bertels joined the team of Leeuwarden Fryslan 2018 European Capital of Culture in the Northern-Dutch province of Friesland as Cultural Director. From 2016 he became the CEO of the organisation.

== The Momentary, Arkansas ==
From 2017-2021, Bertels was the inaugural director of The Momentary, an arts space in Bentonville, Arkansas that is a satellite of the Crystal Bridges Museum of American Art. Bertels departed the Momentary in the spring of 2022. (In 2023, Crystal Bridges executive Jill Wagar was appointed as his successor.)

== Barco NV, Belgium ==
In 2022, Lieven Bertels joined Belgian visual technology company Barco NV.

== Awards and distinctions ==
Lieven Bertels was appointed Knight of the Order of the Crown in 2013. In 2016, he was shortlisted for the Christophe Plantin Prize.
