= Washington on His Deathbed =

1851 painting by Junius Brutus Stearns

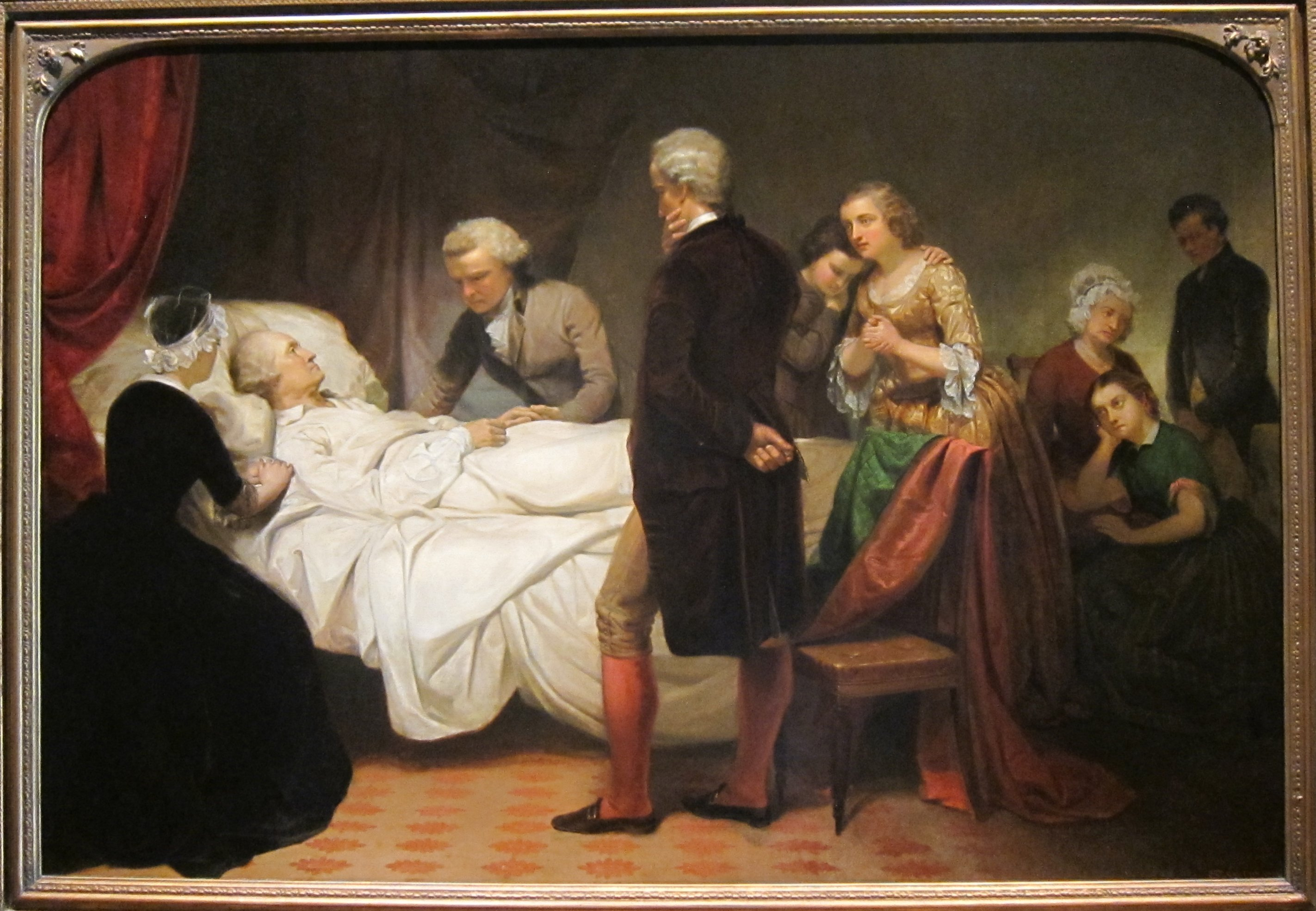
- Artist: Junius Brutus Stearns
- Year: 1851
- Medium: Oil on canvas
- Subject: George Washington
- Dimensions: 94.62 x 137.48

Washington on His Deathbed is an 1851 oil painting of George Washington by Junius Brutus Stearns.

== Description ==
The oil-on-canvas painting depicts George Washington in his final days of his life in December 1799. It shows George Washington in a white robe lying on his bed with a calm expression on his face; his friends and family surround him, with some kneeling by his side or standing over him.

== See also ==
- List of paintings of George Washington
