= Elorriaga (name) =

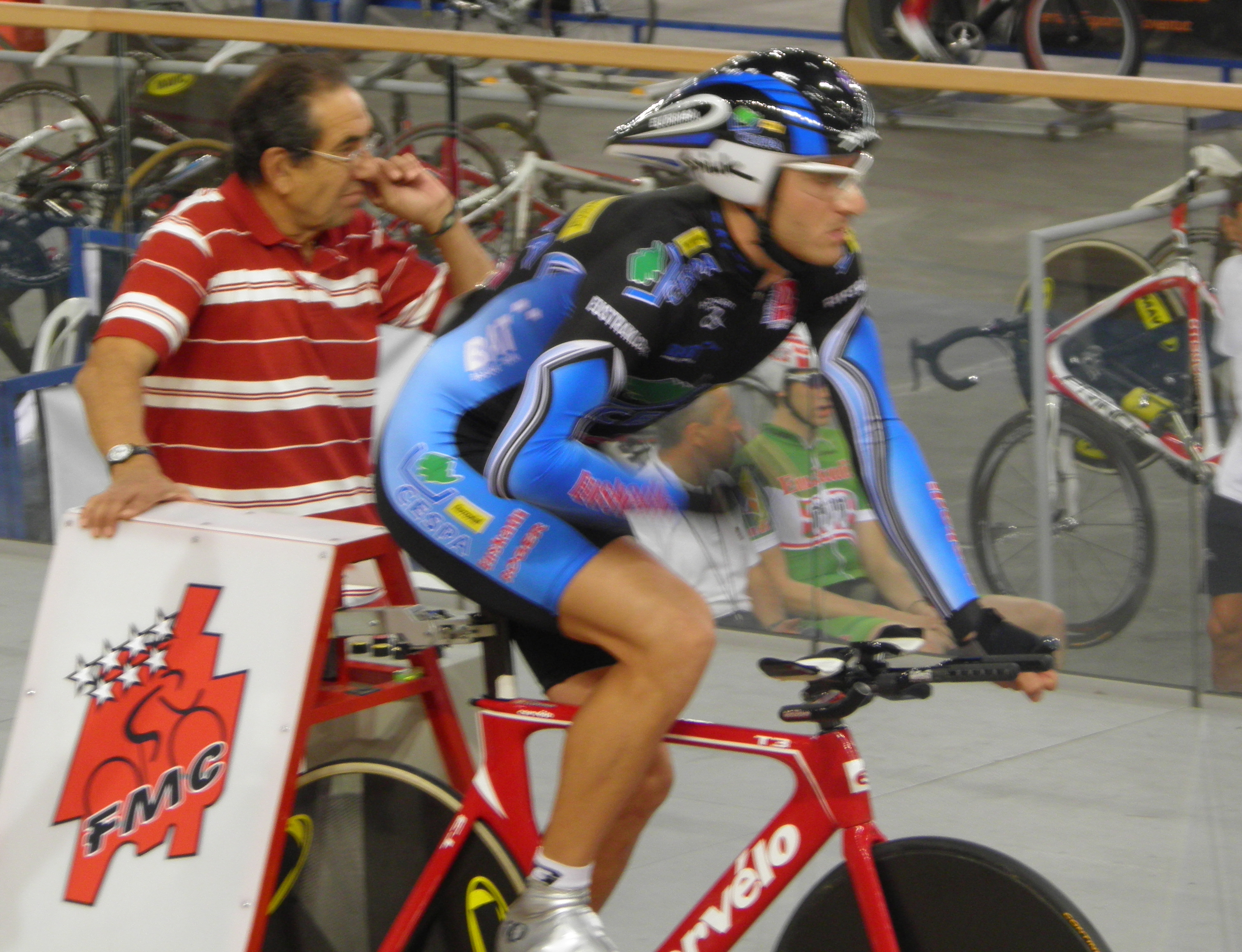
- Unai Elorriaga, a racing cyclist who has the name
- Language: Basque

Origin
- Region of origin: Basque Country, Spain

Elorriaga is a Basque surname.

Notable people with the surname include:

- Benat Intxausti Elorriaga (born 1986), Spanish road bicycle racer
- Francisco Elorriaga (born 1947), Spanish cyclist
- Javier Elorriaga (born 1961), Mexican journalist
- Joseba Garmendia Elorriaga (born 1985), Spanish footballer
- Ramon de Elorriaga (1836–1898), Spanish painter
- Unai Elorriaga López de Letona (born 1973), Basque writer
- Unai Elorriaga (born 1980), Spanish cyclist
- Xabier Elorriaga (born 1944), Basque actor
