= George Washington as Colonel in the Virginia Regiment =

1772 painting by Charles Willson Peale

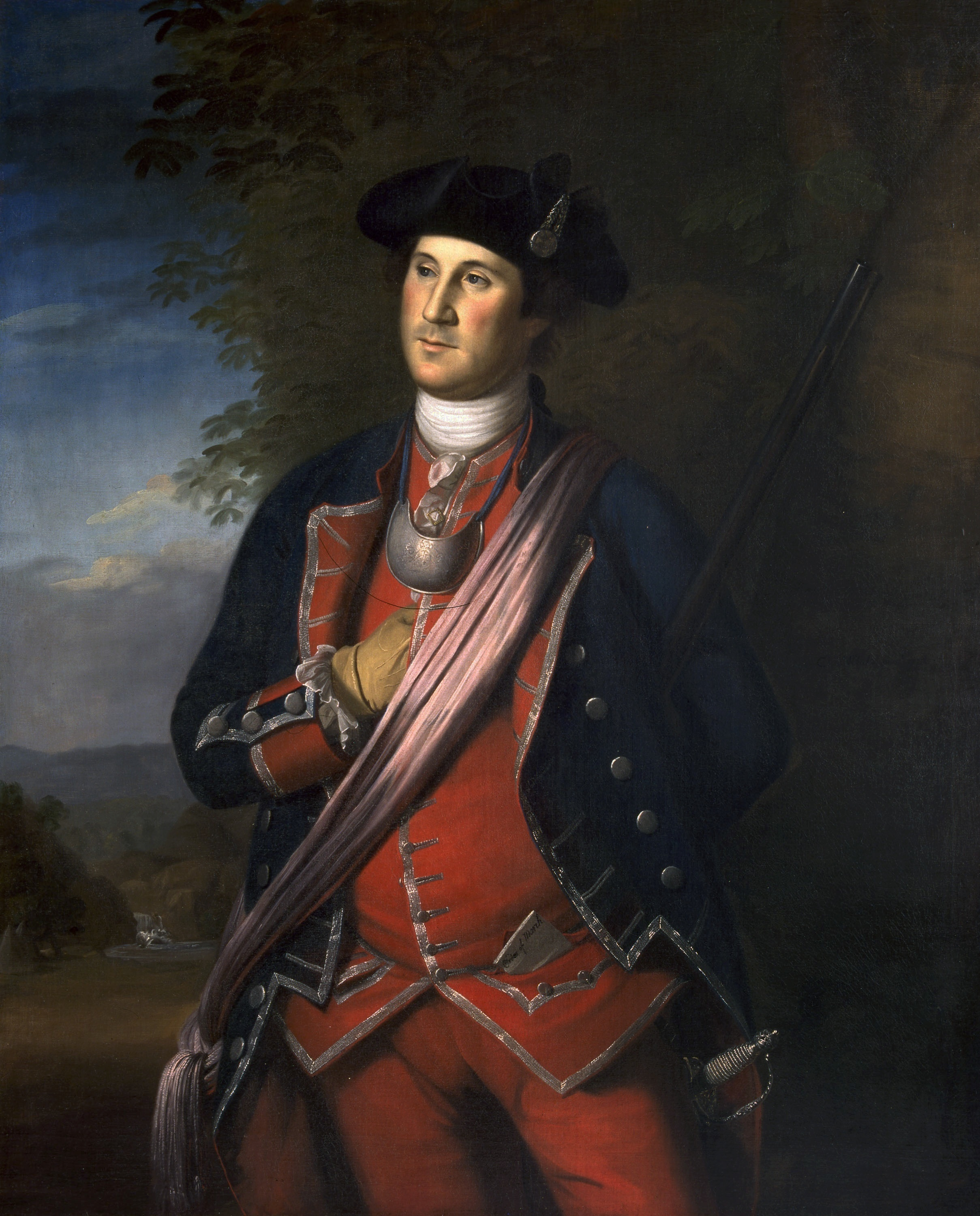
- Artist: Charles Willson Peale
- Year: 1772
- Medium: Oil on canvas
- Subject: George Washington
- Location: Lexington, Virginia

George Washington as Colonel in the Virginia Regiment is a 1772 oil painting by Charles Willson Peale. It is the first known painting of Founding Father George Washington.

== Background ==
Washington served in the Virginia Regiment from 1753 to 1758 and rose to become a commander. The painting depicts Washington during the French and Indian War. Washington stands outside wearing his Virginia Regiment Colonel uniform.

== History ==
Washington's wife, Martha Washington, had the painting commissioned to hang at Mount Vernon as well as the 1757 painting Portrait of Martha Dandridge Custis by John Wollaston. The painting is the first known painting of Washington ever and is also the only pre-Revolutionary War painting of him.

== See also ==
- List of paintings of George Washington
