= General George Washington (Sully) =

Painting by Thomas Sully

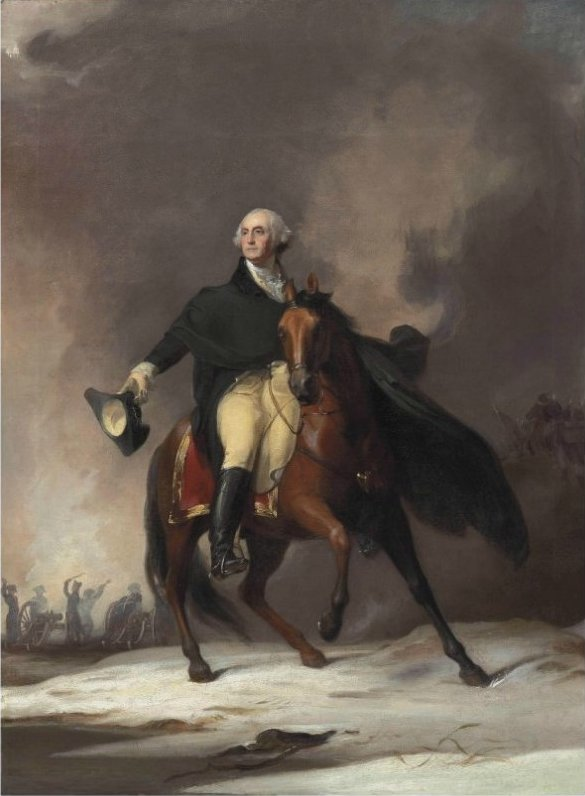
- Artist: Thomas Sully
- Year: 1842
- Medium: Oil on canvas
- Dimensions: 91.4 cm × 68.6 cm (36.0 in × 27.0 in)
- Location: Private collection

General George Washington is an oil on canvas equestrian portrait of the first President of the United States by English American painter Thomas Sully, from 1842. It is held in a private collection.

== History and description ==
Sully was one of the leading portrait painters in his time, in the United States and England, making more than 2000 portraits, including Presidents, nobility and Queen Victoria. He considered himself both as a portrait and an History painter, and this was one of the few paintings he dedicated to American history.

Sully had painted several American Presidents, from the natural, such as Thomas Jefferson and Andrew Jackson, but since he never meet personally George Washington, he based the likenesses he made of him from other representations, specially the portraits of Gilbert Stuart. He ended up creating twenty one representations of Washington during his career.

For this equestrian portrait, Sully took inspiration from the famous painting by Jacques-Louis David, Napoleon Crossing the Alps, that he had sketched himself. However, his depiction is totally unlike the epic, heroic painting of David. Washington appears in a dignified way, but appears in a much more human and realistic way. John Clubbe states that this depiction shows Washington in a very critical way of war: "He appears pensive, weary of death and tragedy... Aware of the human cost, Sully's hero turns his back upon the violent fray, his countenance grim." He is depicted "not an iconic pater patriae, but [as] a suffering yet strong Romantic hero."

The painter valued realism for his historical paintings. For the Washington related paintings, he explained that he took inspiration from the Memoirs of General Wilkinson, and he also visited the places where the war scenes had taken place. Its still uncertain which battle is depicted in this painting. It was claimed in 1940 that it was the Battle of Trenton, in 1776, however Washington appears much older in this equestrian depiction. It is most likely that it portrays him at the Whiskey Rebellion, in 1794, like the Eight Annual Exhibition of the Artists' Fund Society of Philadelphia, in 1843, states in the title given to the painting Equestrian Portrait of Gen. Washington reviewing his troops, in the year 1794, pending the Whiskey Riots. It was also the only time that a United States President led an army in battle.

== Art market ==
The painting reached the highest price for Sully in the art market when it sold by $1,082,500, at Christie's, on 28 November 2012.

== See also ==
- List of paintings of George Washington
