= Constable-Hamilton Portrait =

Painting by Gilbert Stuart

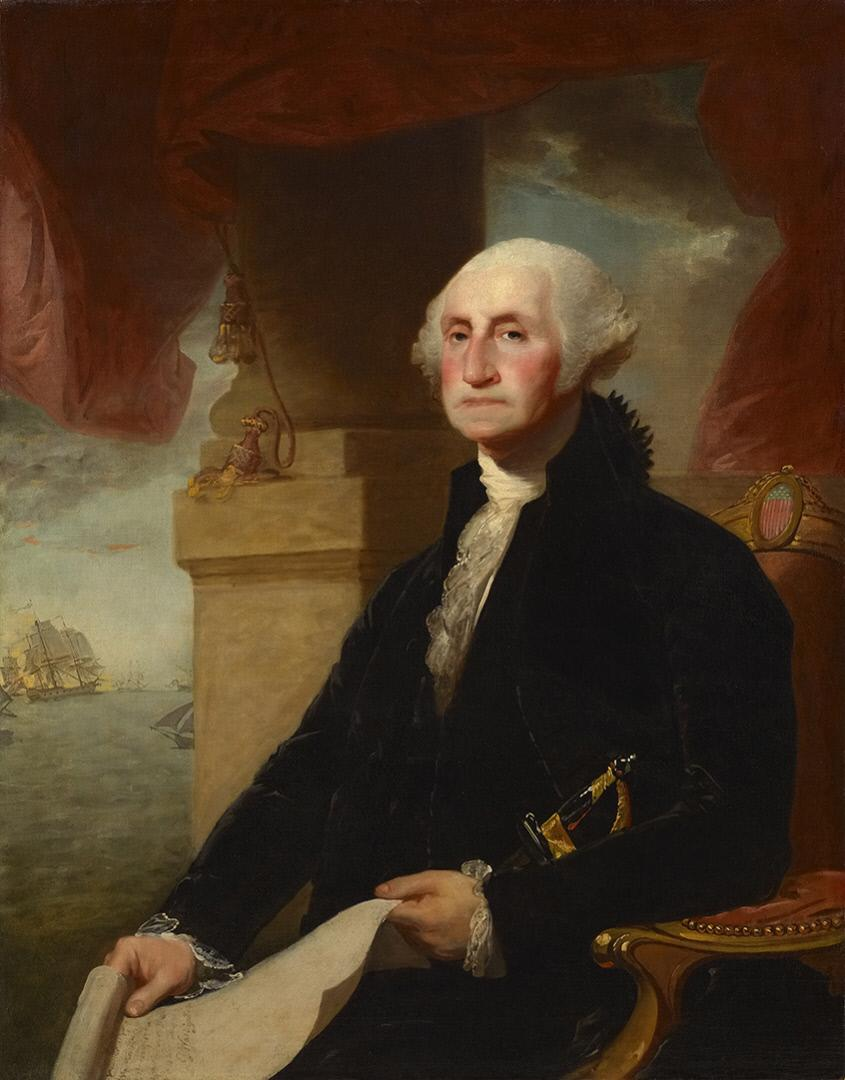
George Washington (Constable-Hamilton Portrait) (1797) by Gilbert Stuart

George Washington (Constable-Hamilton Portrait) is an oil on canvas painting by American artist Gilbert Stuart, made in 1797. It is held at the Crystal Bridges Museum of American Art, in Bentonville, Arkansas. The portrait depicts President George Washington.

== History ==
This painting was meant to commemorate the Jay Treaty of 1795, between the United States and the United Kingdom, as an offering to Alexander Hamilton, which was one of the greatest promoters of the treaty. The signed document sits on President George Washington's lap. This treaty, signed on November 19, 1794, was ratified on August 14, 1795, by the United States Senate and by Great Britain on October 28, 1795. Jay Treaty authorized the British Navy to confiscate goods of French origin transported on United States ships; but it was also forbidden for American ships to transport sugar, cotton and other colonial foodstuffs to any country other than the United States.

The gift of an original portrait of President Washington acknowledged the role and support of Hamilton in Jay Treaty.

== Description ==
Stuart represented President George Washington at work, in his studio in Philadelphia. Although he is wearing a suit, instead of an army uniform, his sword on his lap indicates the president's military role, while the document signed G. Washington represents his position as a legislator and diplomat. The painting can be interpreted as presenting the President as someone who must always be ready to defend his country with arms; but upon his sword is the document of the treaty, as a sign that it is the time of diplomacy. The white space below the signature indicates that there is still a long way to go, down the path of agreements.

In the background of the painting there are ships, one of which bears the American flag, fighting over trade issues, unresolved at the end of the American Revolution. Jay's Treaty therefore is meant to prevent such skirmishes and to provide for peaceful trade between the United States and Great Britain.

This painting was given to Alexander Hamilton by William Constable, who participated in American political affairs. The seascape, unparalleled in Stuart's portraits of Washington, refers to Alexander Hamilton's interest in American trade policy.

== Provenance ==
After several owners, the painting was sold at Sotheby's New York City, on November 30, 2005, for US$8,136,000 to the Crystal Bridges Museum of American Art, in Bentonville.

== See also ==
- List of paintings of George Washington
