= The Momentary =

Art museum

- Established: February 22, 2020
- Location: 507 SE E St, Bentonville, Arkansas
- Coordinates: 36.36669°N 94.20263°W
- Type: Contemporary Art
- Director: Jill Wagar
- Parking: Surface lot and parking garage on site (no charge)
- Website: themomentary.org

The Momentary is a contemporary art space in Bentonville, Arkansas and operates as a satellite of Crystal Bridges Museum of American Art. It opened on February 22, 2020. It offers free public admission.

== Overview and founding ==
As part of the opening of Crystal Bridges in 2011, an exhibition entitled "State of the Art" focused on up and coming contemporary artists from around the United States and was very well received. The growth of the Crystal Bridges collection led to the decision to look for a location to more permanently and prominently feature contemporary art as the original Crystal Bridges facility did not have adequate space for this need.

A 63,000 square foot former Kraft manufacturing facility in downtown Bentonville, about 1 mile from Crystal Bridges, was adaptively reused to create the Momentary facility. The galleries span 24,000 square feet, and are located in the oldest portion of the building.

The Momentary is a non-collecting institution which primarily focuses on visual and performing arts, culinary experiences, festivals, and artists-in-residence. It opened to the public on February 22, 2020, with the performing arts festival Time Being, a 2nd iteration of the exhibition State of the Art and INVERSE Performance Arts Festival.

The founding director of the Momentary was Lieven Bertels, and the current director is Jill Wagar.

The Momentary houses an Onyx Coffee Lab coffee bar and café.

== Design and Concept ==
The design process was unique given the complexity of the existing building, in which each condition was unique. The design team was led by Chicago-based Wheeler Kearns Architects, as an Adaptive reuse project, supported by Lux Populi on lighting design, Thornton Tomasetti for structures, Schuler Shook for theater design, McClelland Consulting Engineers, Inc. and McGuire on Engineering, Threshold Acoustics for sound issues and FODA for interior design. The building was built by Flintco and their subcontractors.
