= Ramón de Elorriaga =

Spanish painter (1836–1898)

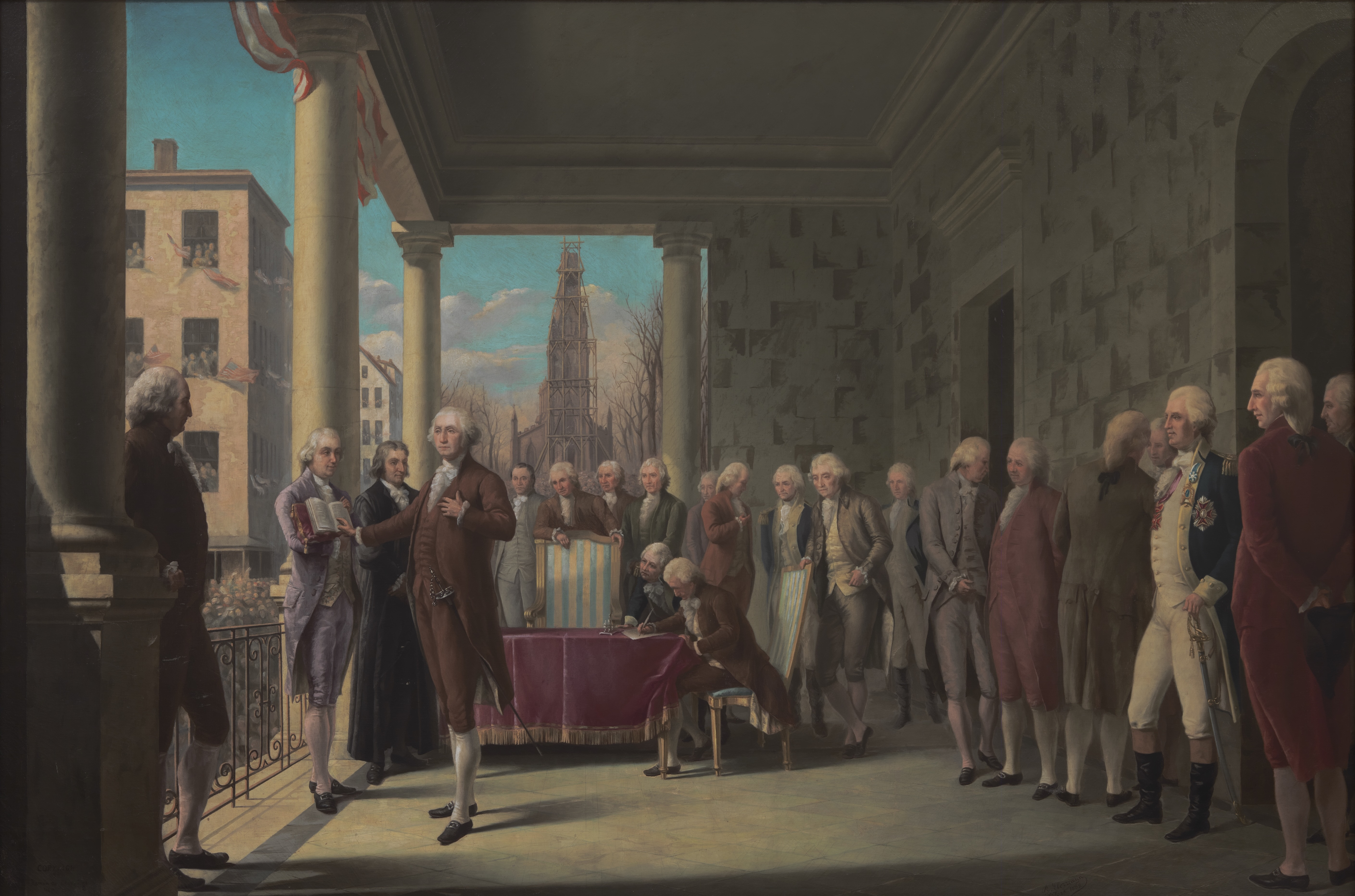
Ramón de Elorriaga, General Washington Delivering His Inaugural Address to New York, April 30, 1789 (1889). Oil on canvas. Federal Hall National Memorial, New York City

Ramón de Elorriaga (31 August 1836 – 1898) was a Spanish painter.

Elorriaga was born in Bilbao, and studied painting in Madrid and Rome. He visited the United States of America in 1875 to 1876. He died in Bilbao.

Elorriaga is credited as the artist of an 1889 painting of the inauguration of George Washington as the first President of the United States. The painting is in the collection of the Federal Hall National Memorial in New York City.

== See also ==
- List of paintings of George Washington
