= Luis Cadena =

Ecuadorian painter

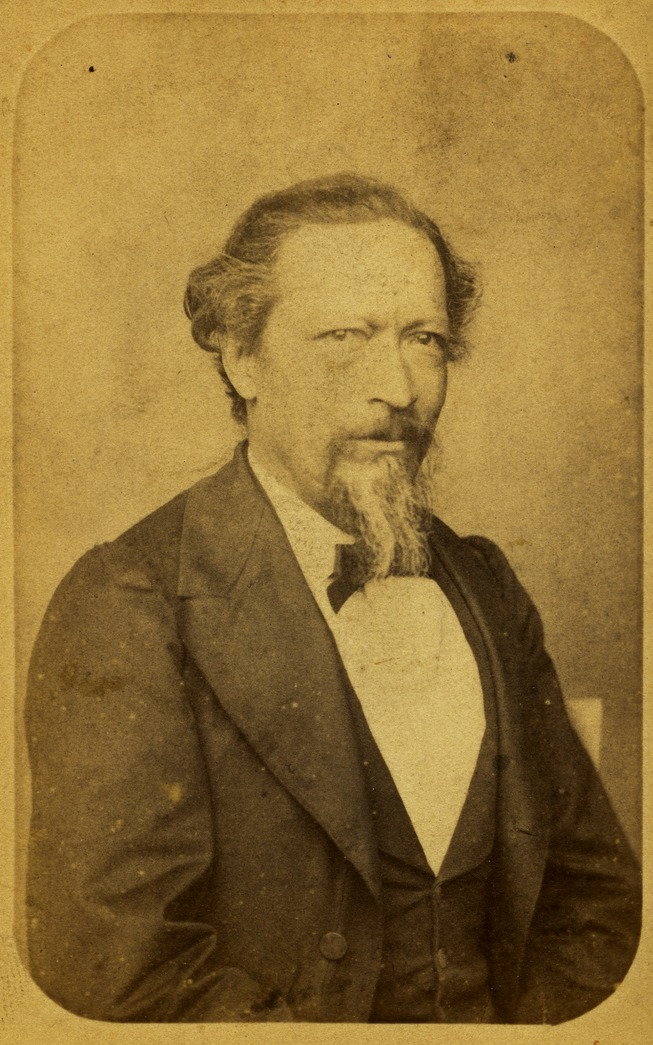
- Cadena in 1877
- Born: 12 January 1830; Machachi, Pichincha, Ecuador
- Died: 1889 (aged 58–59); Quito

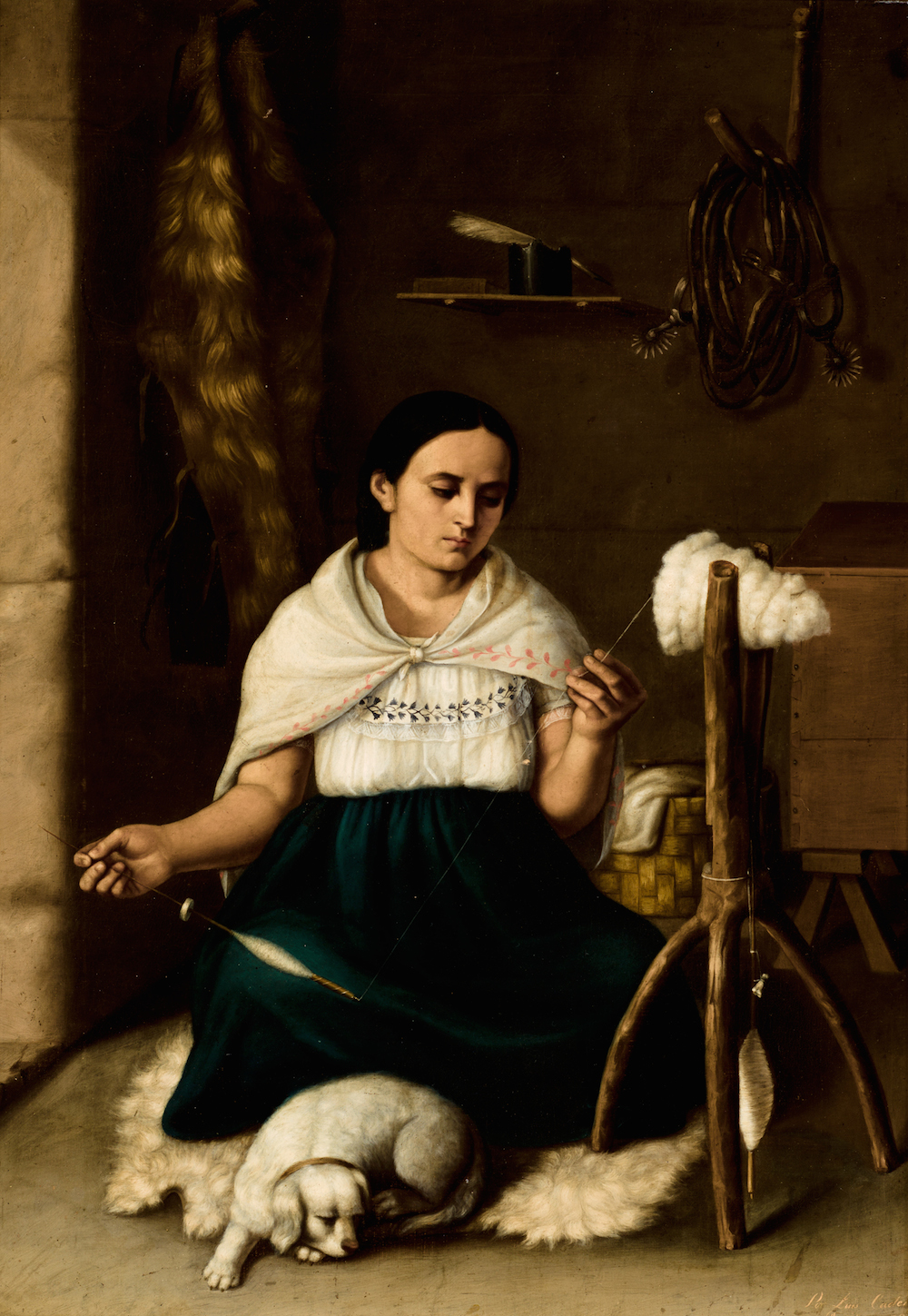
Hilandera campesina, 1859

Luis Cadena (12 January 1830 – 1889) was an Ecuadorian painter. He worked principally in portraiture but also painted many religious subjects for the Roman Catholic Church. He was appointed director of the Academia de Dibujo y Pintura in Quito in December 1860 and served as director of the Escuela de Bellas Artes of the same city from 1872 to 1875.

== Life ==
Cadena was born on 12 January 1830 in Machachi, in the province of Pichincha in Ecuador. His first studies were with Antonio Salas. Between 1852 and 1856, he was in Santiago de Chile, where he worked in portraiture and came under the influence of the French Neo-classical painter Raymond Monvoisin, who was living there.

In 1854 the government of José María Urvina approved three bursaries of six thousand pesos to enable artists to travel to Italy to study. Cadena was the first to receive one of these grants, and in 1857 he travelled to Rome, where he enrolled at the Accademia Nazionale di San Luca and studied under Alessandro Marini. In 1860 he returned to Quito, and in December of that year, he was appointed director of the Academia de Dibujo y Pintura there. His acceptance of the position was a condition of the scholarship he had received; he held it until December 1862. From 1872 to 1875, under the second presidency of Gabriel García Moreno, he was director of the Escuela de Bellas Artes of Quito.

He died in Quito in 1889.

== Work ==
Cadena worked mostly as a portraitist. He also painted a number of religious canvases, among them a series of eight scenes of the Life of St. Augustine in the Convent of San Agustín in Quito, commissioned in 1864, and a series of Mysteries of the Virgin of the Rosary for the Convent of Santo Domingo in the same city, commissioned in 1888.

Several of his works are in the Museo de Arte Moderno of the Casa de la Cultura Ecuatoriana in Quito. Among them are a full-length portrait of Gabriel García Moreno, a self-portrait, various nude studies and a Rapto de Deyanira. Hilandera campesina, a genre painting of a girl spinning, is in the collection of the Los Angeles County Museum of Art.
