= Crystal Bridges Museum of American Art =

Art museum in Bentonville, Arkansas

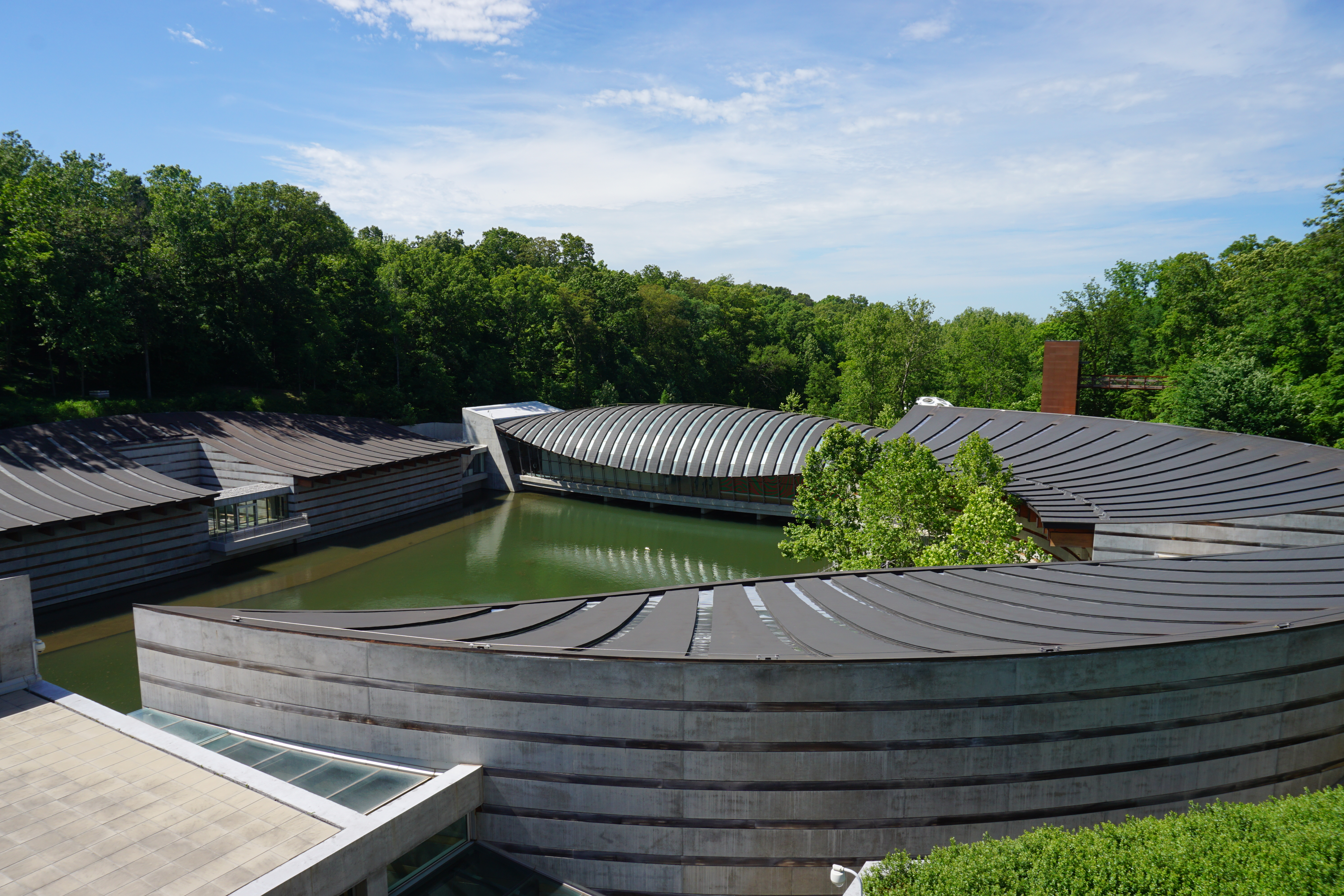
- Panoramic view of the museum
- Interactive fullscreen map
- Established: 11 November 2011
- Location: 600 Museum Way, Bentonville, Arkansas
- Coordinates: 36°22′56″N 94°12′14″W
- Type: American art
- Founder: Alice Walton
- Director: Rod Bigelow
- Architect: Moshe Safdie
- Parking: free garage and surface lot on site
- Website: crystalbridges.org

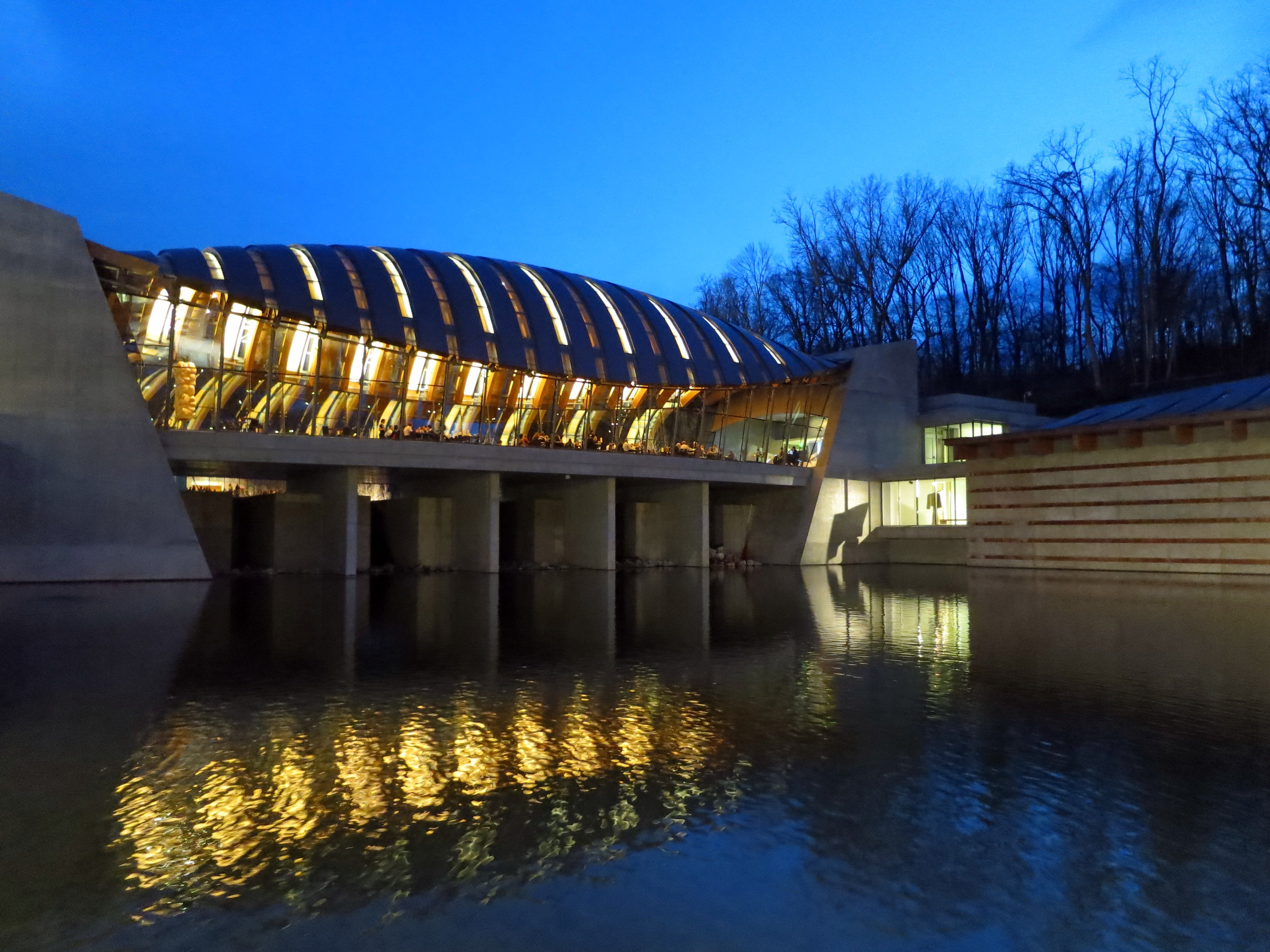
Crystal Bridges at dusk

The Crystal Bridges Museum of American Art is an art museum located in Bentonville, Arkansas, which opened to the public on November 11, 2011, and was founded by Alice Walton.

The museum is situated on a site of approximately 120 to 134 acres of native Ozark forest and consists of eight interconnected pavilions designed by architect Moshe Safdie. Its collection focuses on American art across multiple periods and media, and is displayed in buildings integrated into the surrounding landscape. The institution operates with a permanent endowment, allowing it to offer free general admission to the public.

== History ==
The Crystal Bridges Museum of American Art was founded by philanthropist Alice Walton and opened on November 11, 2011, as a nonprofit charitable organization providing public access to American art and integrating natural landscapes into its campus design.

Walton, the daughter of Sam Walton, began collecting American art in the late 20th century, focusing on 19th- and early 20th-century works, including artists such as Thomas Moran, Andrew Wyeth, John Singer Sargent, and Georgia O'Keeffe, before expanding to contemporary works. The Walton Family Foundation provided an initial endowment of approximately $800 million to fund construction, acquisitions, and operating expenses. The endowment was supplemented by a $20 million gift from Walmart to support free admission.

The museum occupies a 120-acre site in a natural ravine containing mature Ozark forests and Crystal Spring, a limestone-fed water source. Buildings are located within the ravine to integrate with the topography, and two ponds were formed by damming the spring.

Moshe Safdie designed the museum as eight interconnected pavilions totaling approximately 200,000 sq ft, using architectural concrete, western red cedar, copper roofing, laminated pine (glulam), and locally sourced fieldstone. Some pavilions employ suspension bridge technology, with foundations stabilized using minipiles anchored in limestone bedrock.

The collection spans five centuries of American art and includes both historically recognized and underrepresented artists. Notable acquisitions include Kindred Spirits by Asher B. Durand, purchased in 2005 for over $35 million, and the shared 101-piece Alfred Stieglitz Collection with Fisk University following a 2012 legal settlement. In 2013, the museum acquired the Bachman–Wilson House, a Frank Lloyd Wright Usonian house, which was relocated from New Jersey and opened to the public in 2015. In February 2020, the museum opened The Momentary, a 63,000 sq ft contemporary arts venue in a converted cheese factory.

The museum has contributed to the revitalization of downtown Bentonville and the Northwest Arkansas region, supporting employment, tourism, and local economic development. Critical reception has noted the museum's rural location and funding sources as points of debate, while also recognizing its role in increasing access to American art.

== Collaboration with other museums and institutions ==
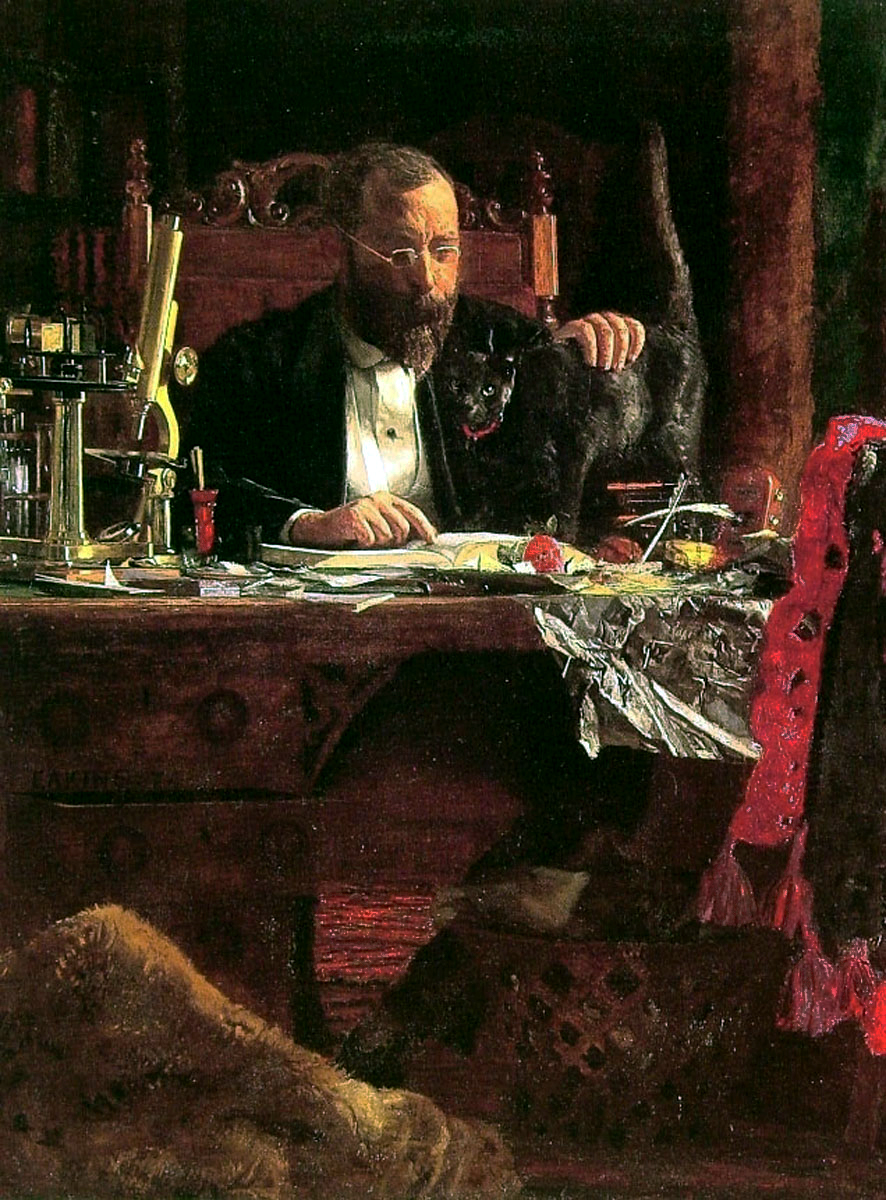
Portrait of Professor Benjamin H. Rand (1874) by Thomas Eakins

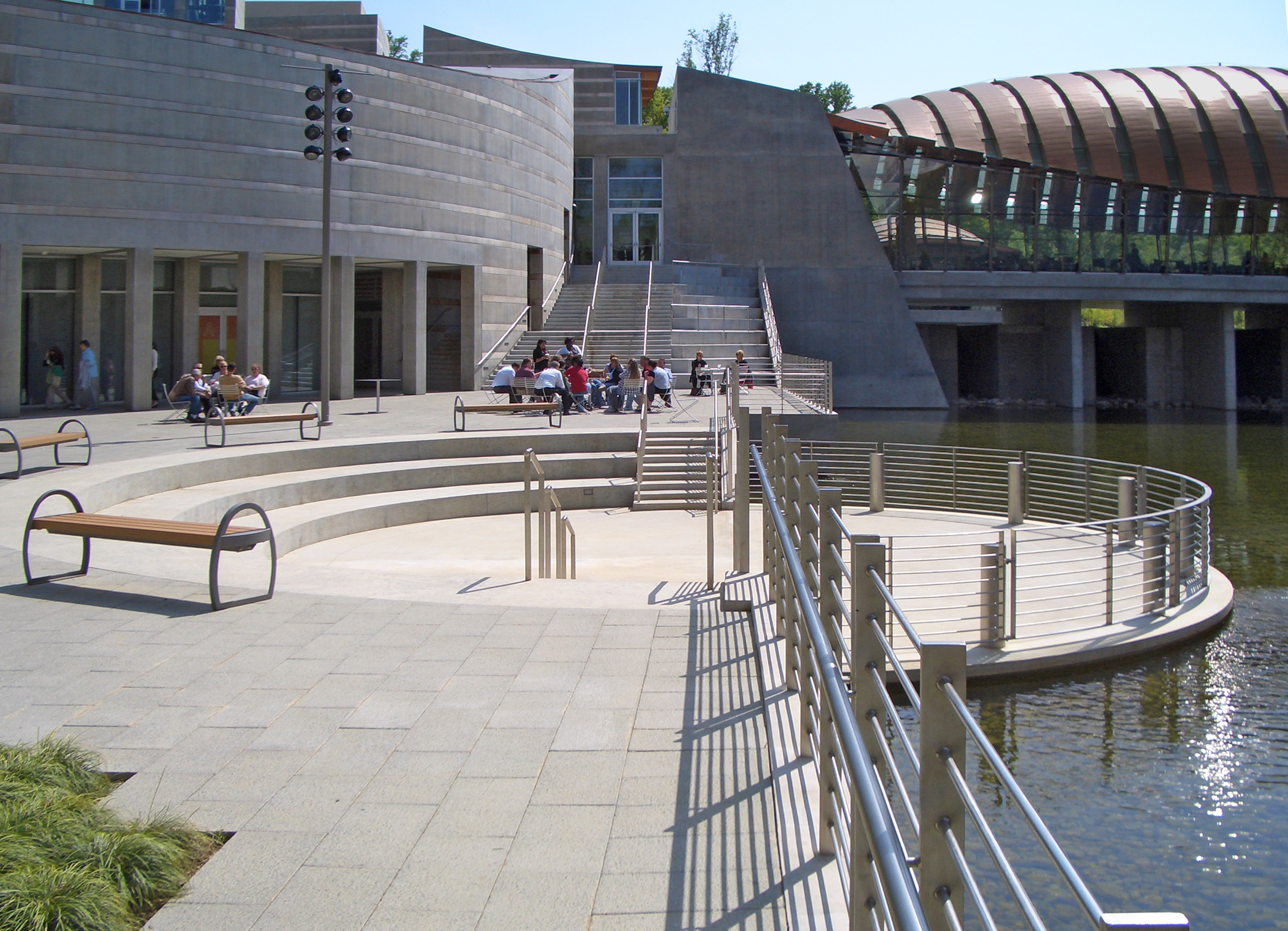
Walker Landing plaza between galleries

In 2006, the museum partnered with the National Gallery of Art in an attempt to purchase Thomas Eakins' The Gross Clinic from Thomas Jefferson University. Under the terms of the agreement, the two museums agreed to pay a record $68 million, but the university gave Philadelphia 45 days to match the offer. The Philadelphia Museum of Art and Pennsylvania Academy of Fine Arts agreed to collectively match the offer and the painting remained in Philadelphia. The purchase forced both museums to sell some of their best Eakins pieces including Cowboy Singing and The Cello Player. In April 2007, Crystal Bridges acquired another Eakins belonging to Thomas Jefferson University entitled Portrait of Professor Benjamin H. Rand for an estimated $20 million.

Walton held talks with Randolph-Macon Woman's College (now Randolph College) in Lynchburg, Virginia in spring of 2007. The college was exploring selling part of the Maier Museum of Art's collection, but voted instead to sell select items from the collection at Christie's. In 2006, Fisk University agreed to sell a 50% stake in a 101-piece Stieglitz collection to Crystal Bridges for $30 million. The collection was donated to the university by Georgia O'Keeffe in 1949. This agreement became tied up in a legal battle between Fisk University and the Georgia O'Keeffe Museum in New Mexico, but the museum withdrew its lawsuit. The Tennessee Attorney General attempted unsuccessfully to stop the sale. In October 2010, a judge ruled that a 50% stake in the collection could be sold to Crystal Bridges if modifications to the contract were made so that Fisk University could not lose its interest in the collection, nor could the joint venture holding ownership of the collection between Fisk University and Crystal Bridges be based in Delaware (or outside Tennessee Courts). The modified agreement would allow the works to stay at Fisk University until 2013 and then begin a two-year rotation with Crystal Bridges. In April 2012, the Tennessee Supreme Court upheld a lower court decision to allow the sale to move forward. A few months later, in August, the Davidson County Chancery Court approval a Final Agreed Order that established joint ownership between Fisk University and Crystal Bridges through the newly established Stieglitz Art Collection, LLC. The operating agreement required Fisk University to set aside $3.9 million of the $30 million sale proceeds to be used to establish a fund for the care and maintenance of the collection at the Carl Van Vechten Gallery at Fisk University. The court dispute cost Fisk University $5.8 million in legal fees.

Since 2012, Crystal Bridges has participated in a four-year collaboration with the musée du Louvre in Paris, High Museum of Art in Atlanta, and the Terra Foundation for American Art. The resulting exhibitions are called American Encounters and feature works from the collections of all four partners. Each year, for the length of the collaboration, the museums develop the exhibition around a theme, such as portraiture. American Encounters has been seen in Paris, Bentonville, and Atlanta.

== The Momentary ==
In early 2020, Crystal Bridges opened a satellite facility called The Momentary focused on visual and performing arts, culinary experiences, festivals, and artists-in-residence.

== Collections ==
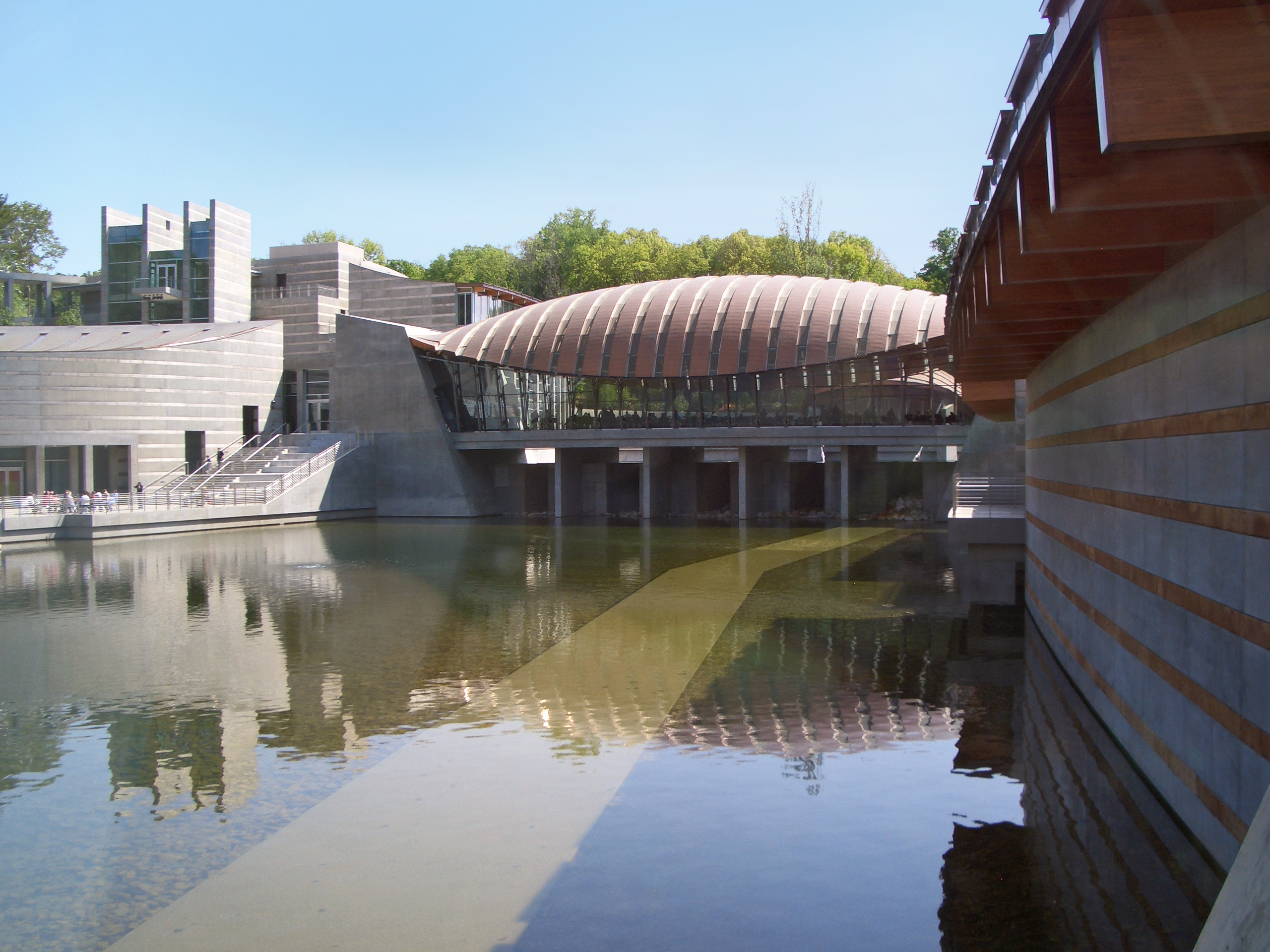
Pavilion housing the restaurant Eleven, with the main lobby and 19th-century galleries visible at left

The permanent collection spans five centuries of American art, including colonial portraiture, 19th- and 20th-century works, and contemporary art. Notable works include Asher B. Durand's Kindred Spirits, a Hudson River School painting; Norman Rockwell's Rosie the Riveter, a World War II-era illustration; and Georgia O'Keeffe's Jimson Weed, a hallmark of American modernism.

The museum holds a rotating selection of contemporary and Indigenous art, including works by Kerry James Marshall, Maya Lin, and Jaune Quick-to-See Smith. Exhibitions such as Art for a New Understanding: Native Voices, 1950s to Now have featured Indigenous artists, some of whose works have been added to the permanent collection.

=== Collection highlights ===
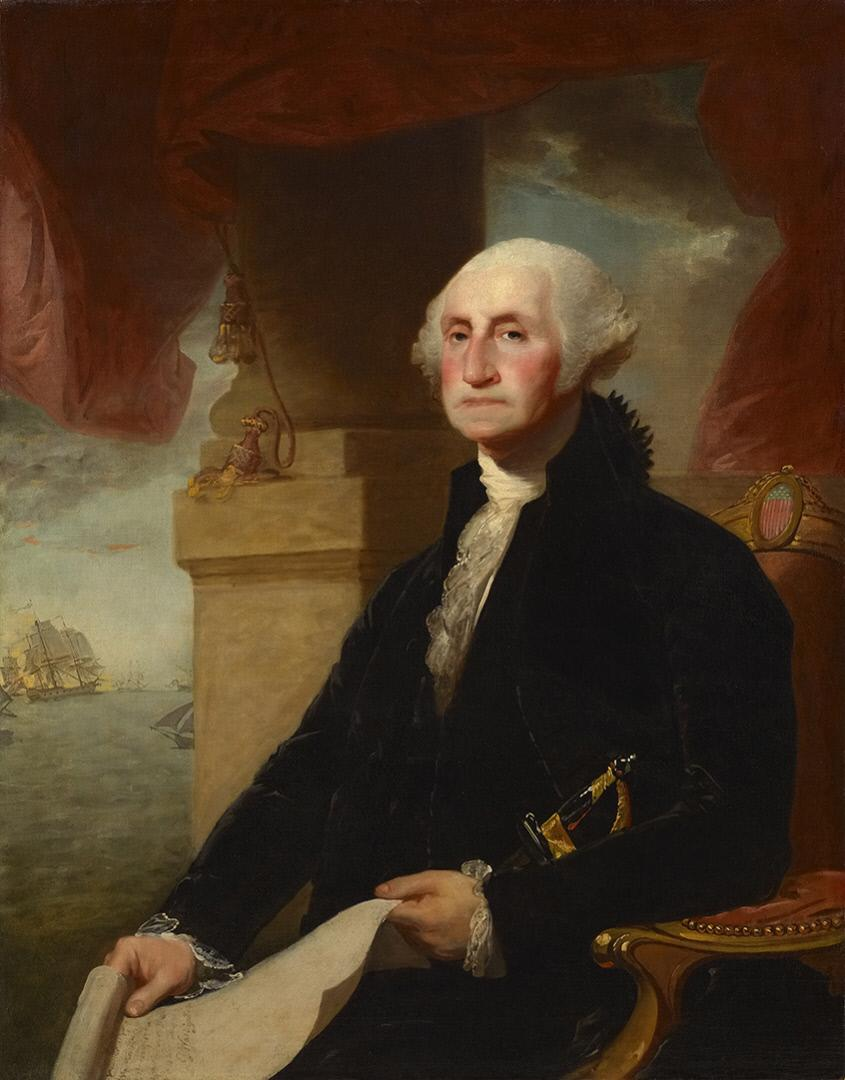
Portrait of George Washington (The Constable-Hamilton Portrait, 1797) by Gilbert Stuart, early American portraiture

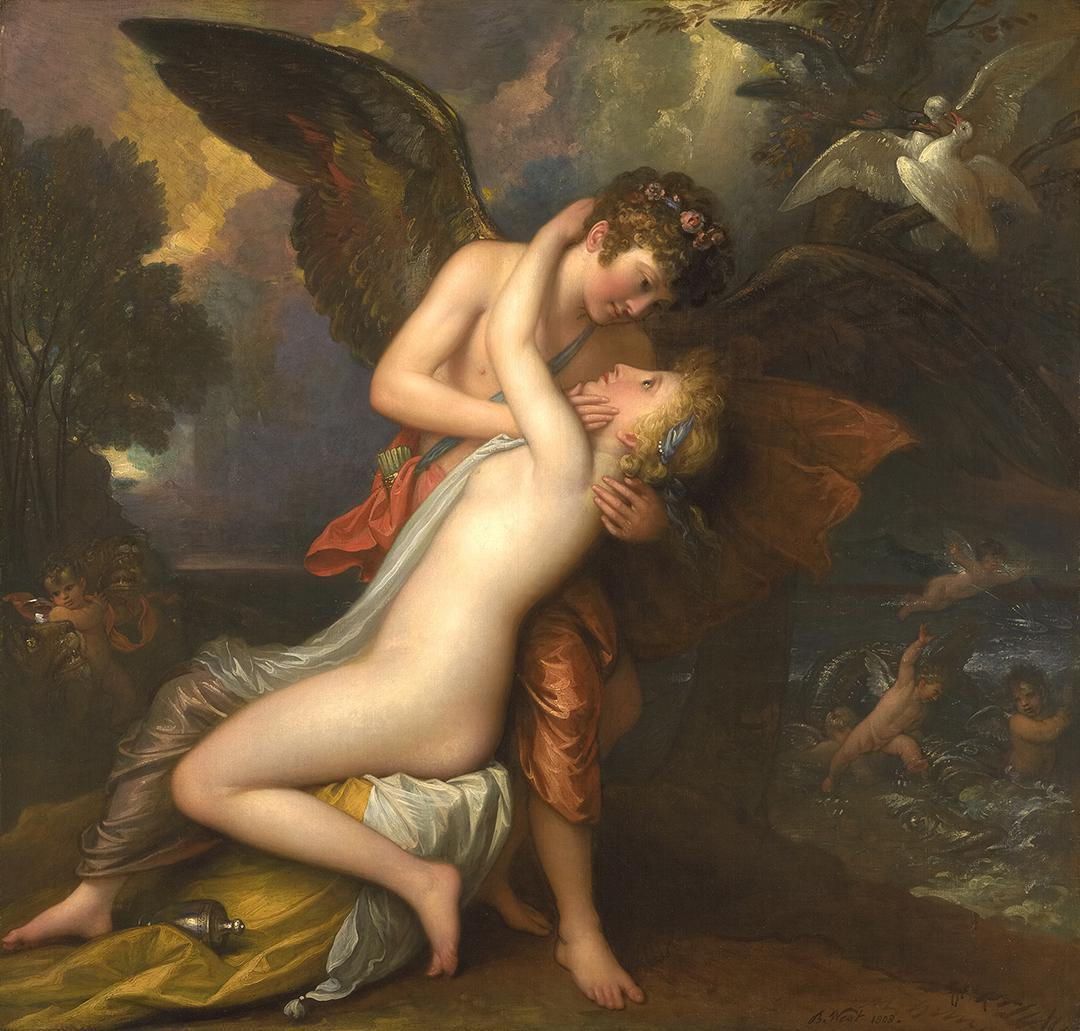
Cupid and Psyche (1808) by Benjamin West, Neoclassical history painting

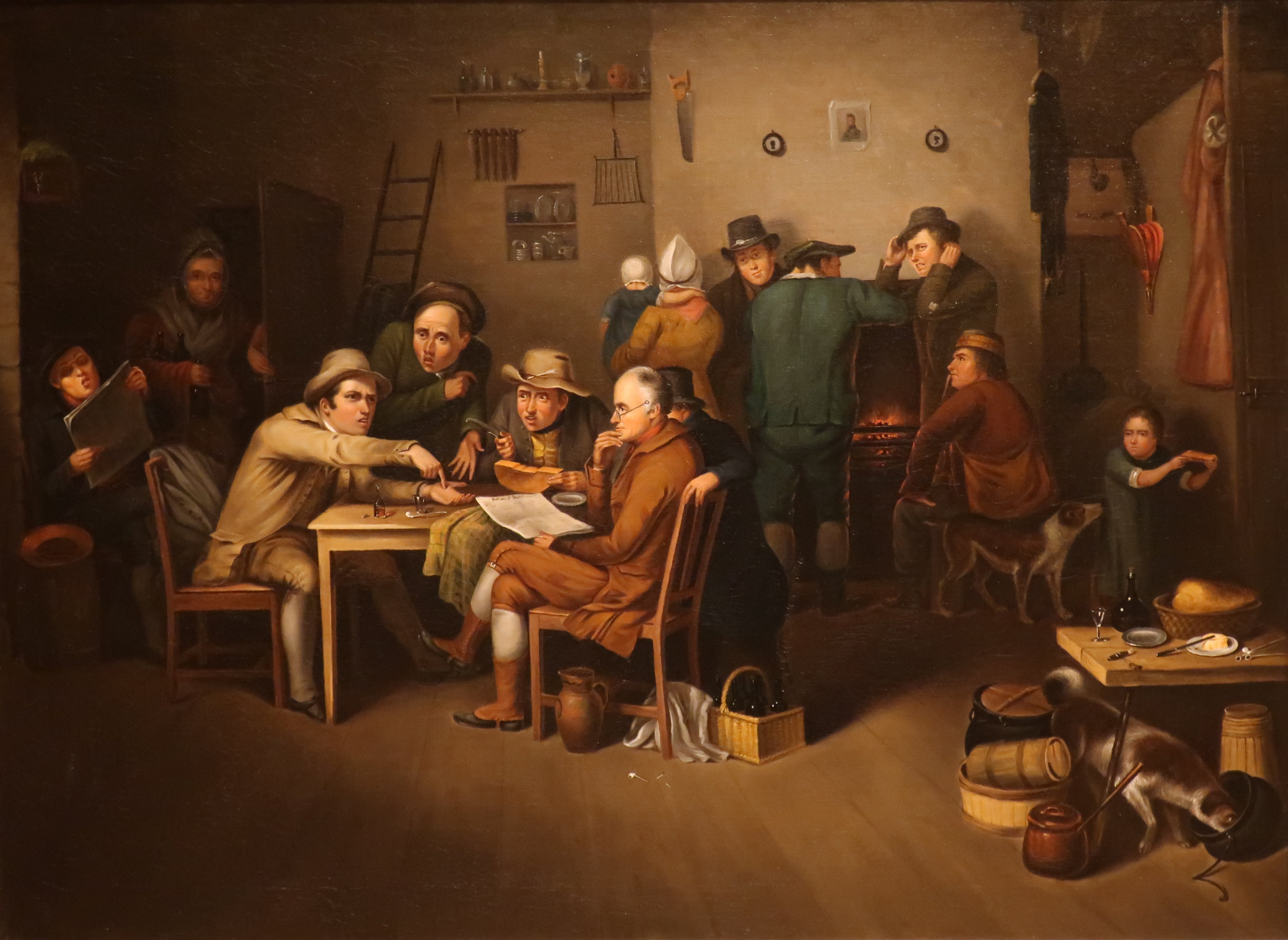
The Village Politicians (c. 1819) by John Lewis Krimmel, genre painting of early American life

View of Mount Etna (1843–44) by Thomas Cole, Hudson River School landscape

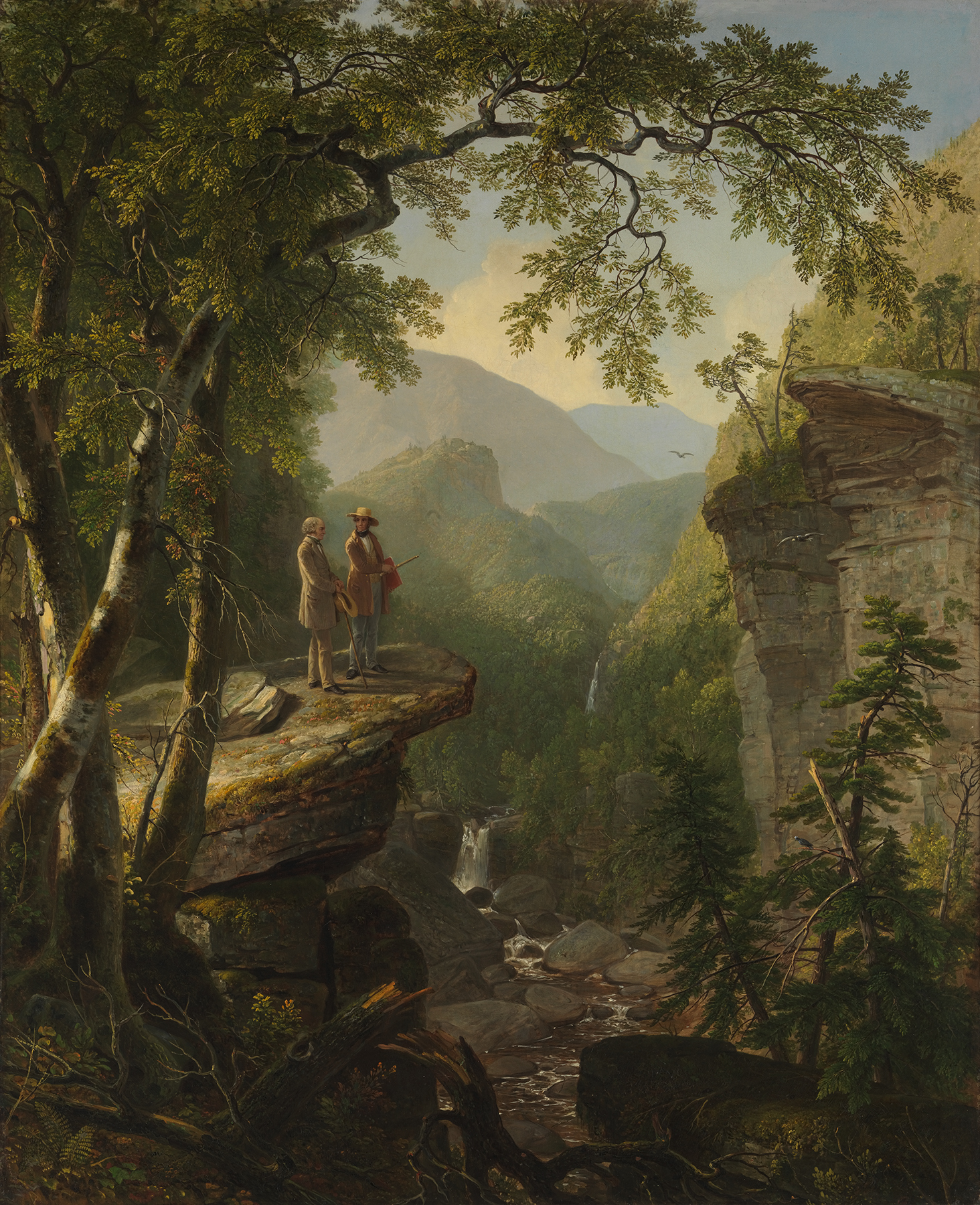
Kindred Spirits (1849) by Asher B. Durand, Hudson River School masterpiece

The Reader (1877) by Mary Cassatt, impressionist portraiture

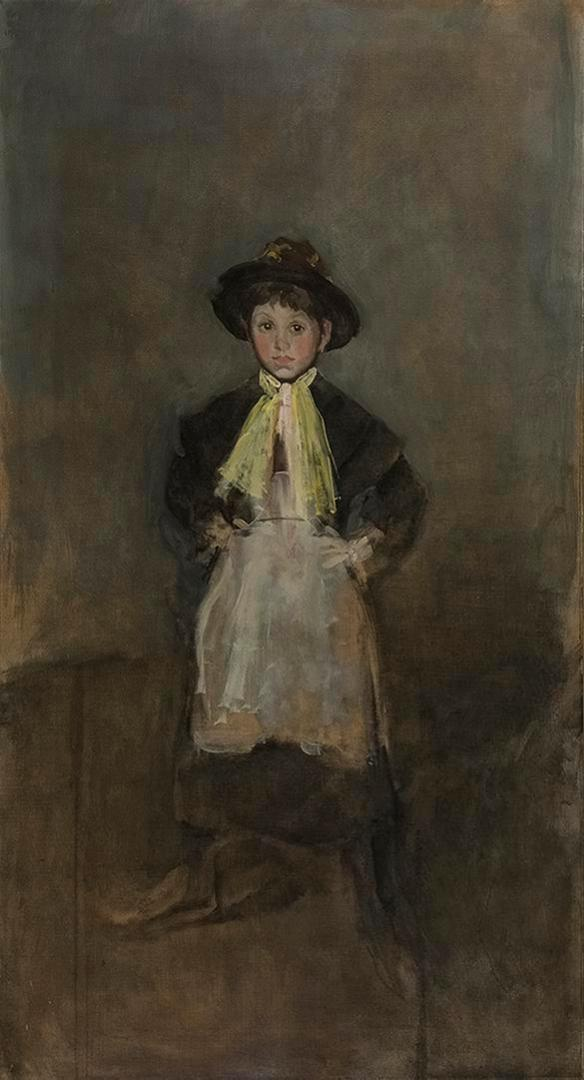
The Chelsea Girl (1884) by James McNeill Whistler

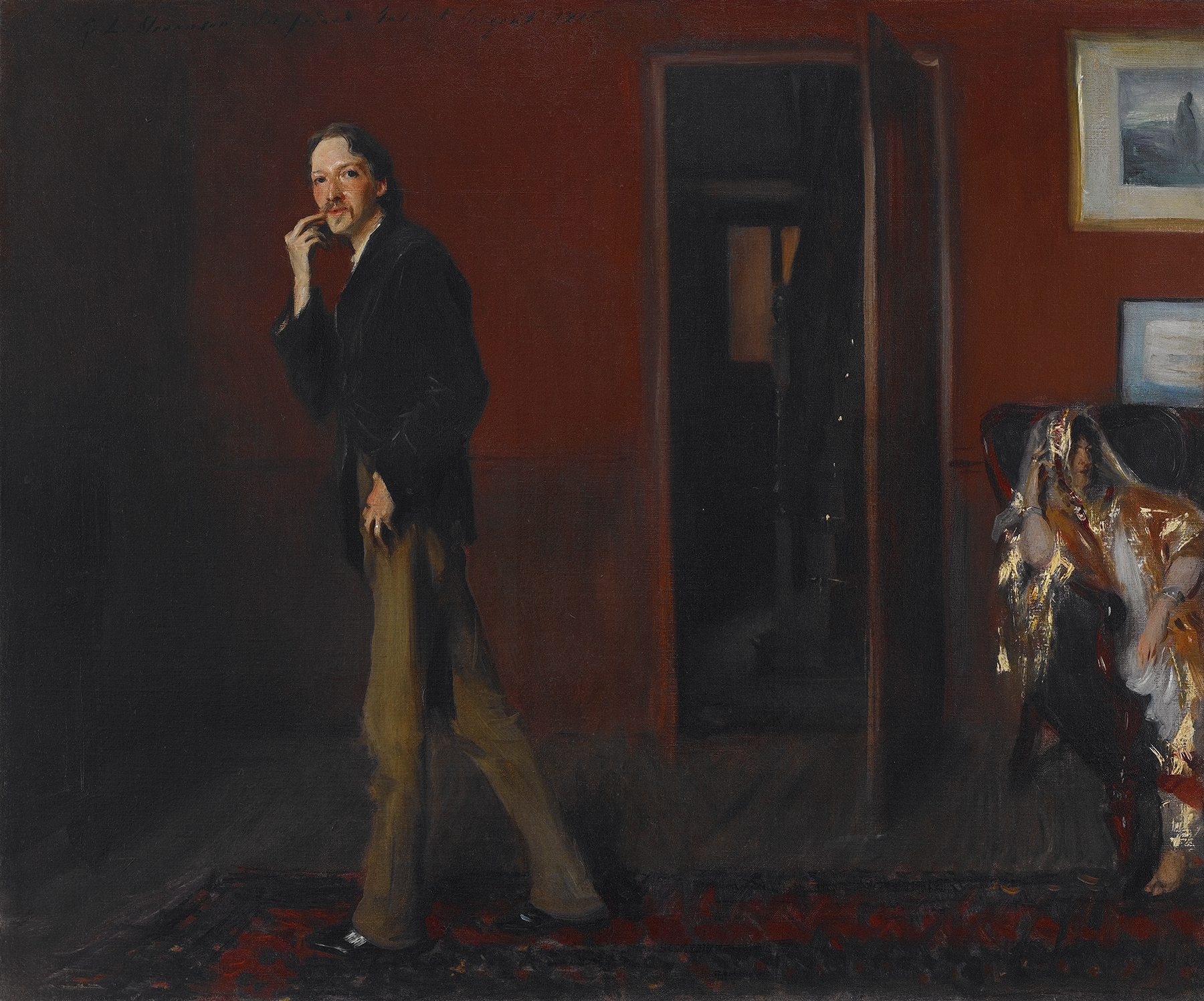
Robert Louis Stevenson and His Wife (1885) by John Singer Sargent, society portrait

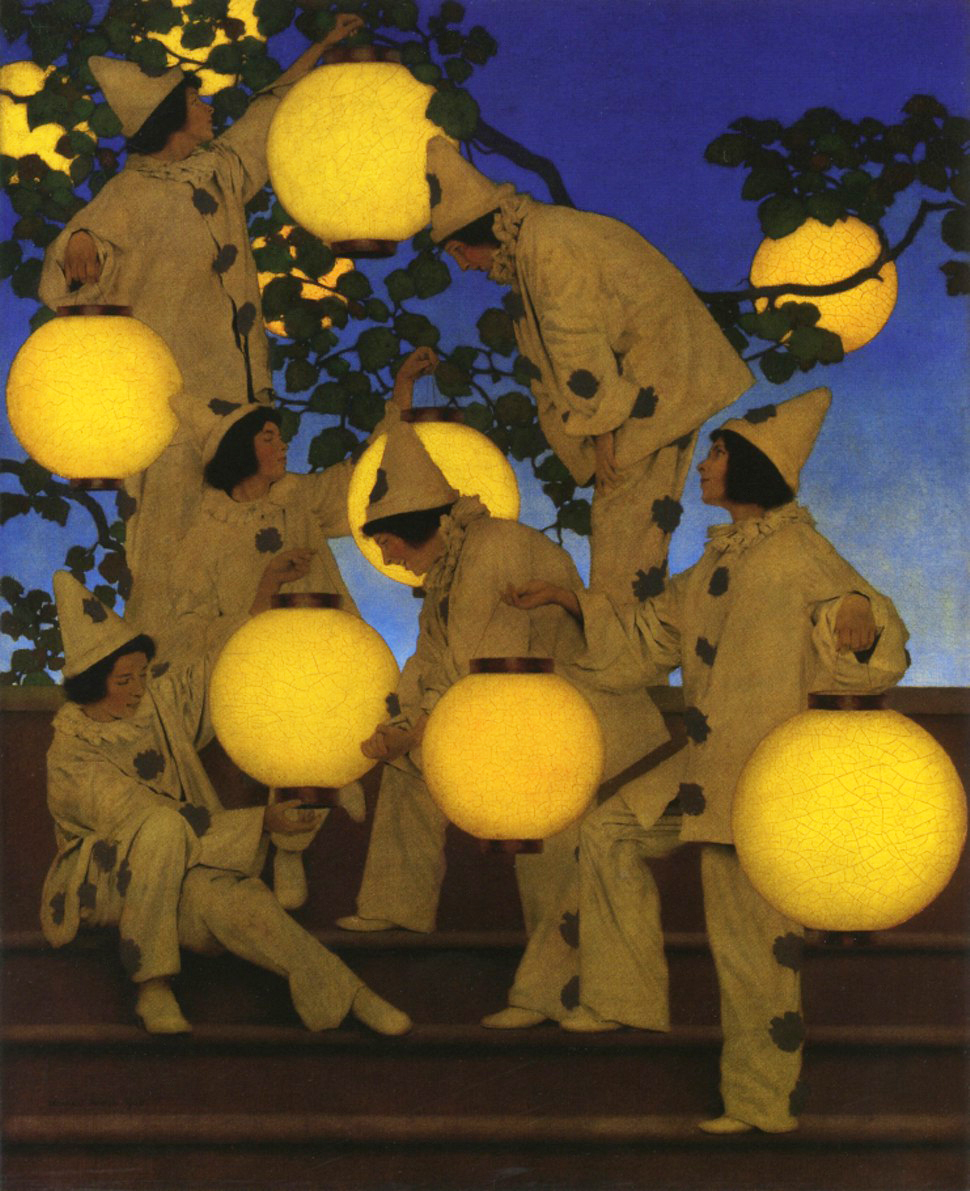
The Lantern Bearers (1908) by Maxfield Parrish, illustration and American fantasy art

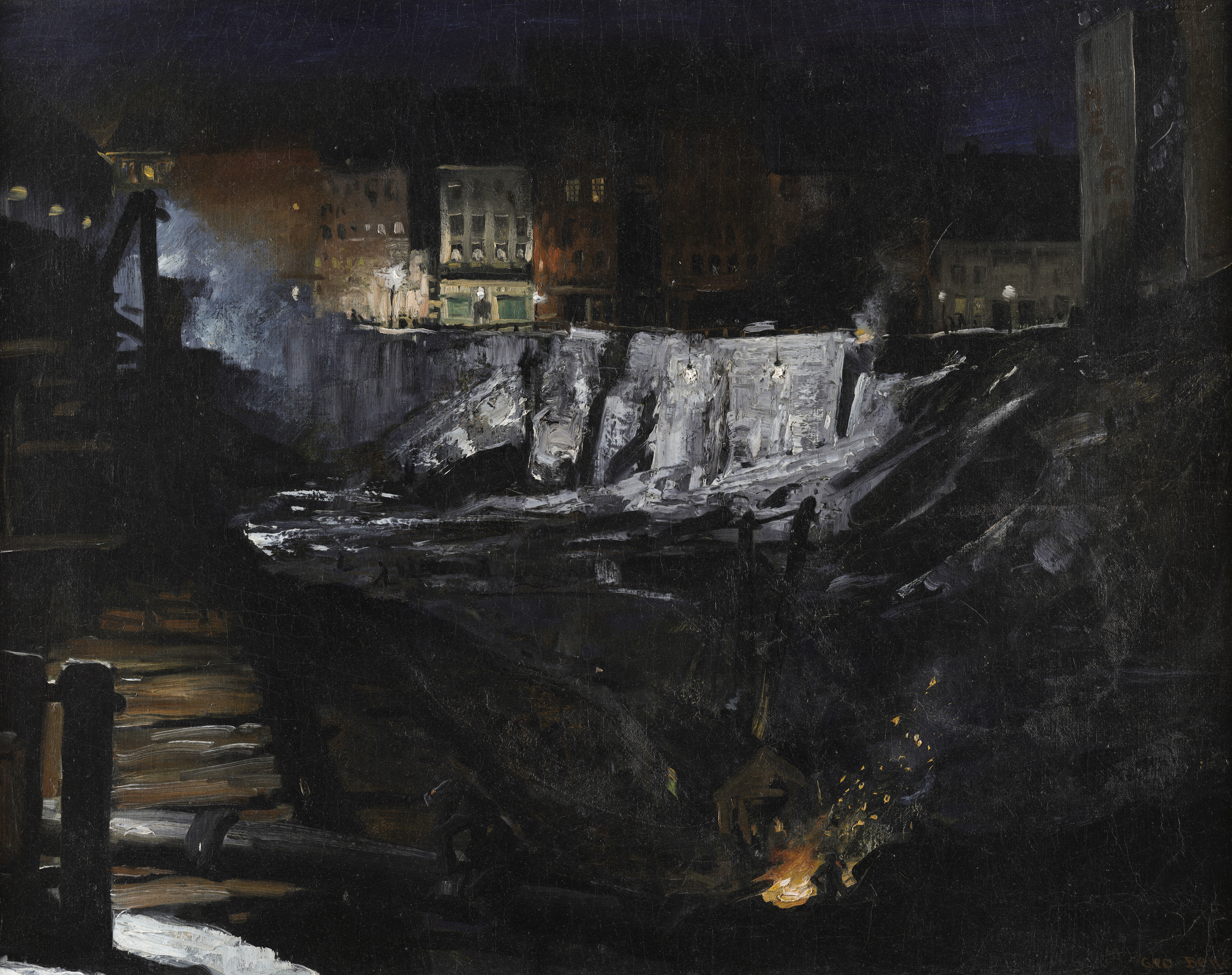
Excavation at Night (1908) by George Bellows, realist urban scene
