= Junius Brutus Stearns =

American artist (1810–1885)

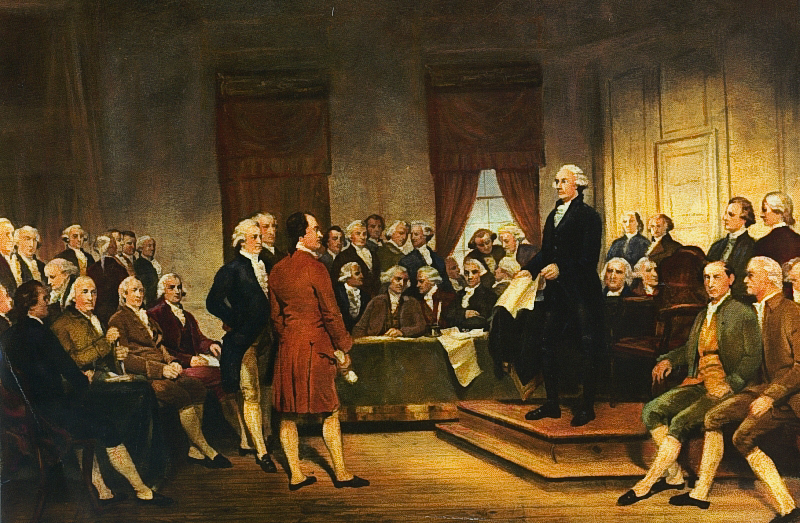
Signing of the U.S.Constitution (1856)

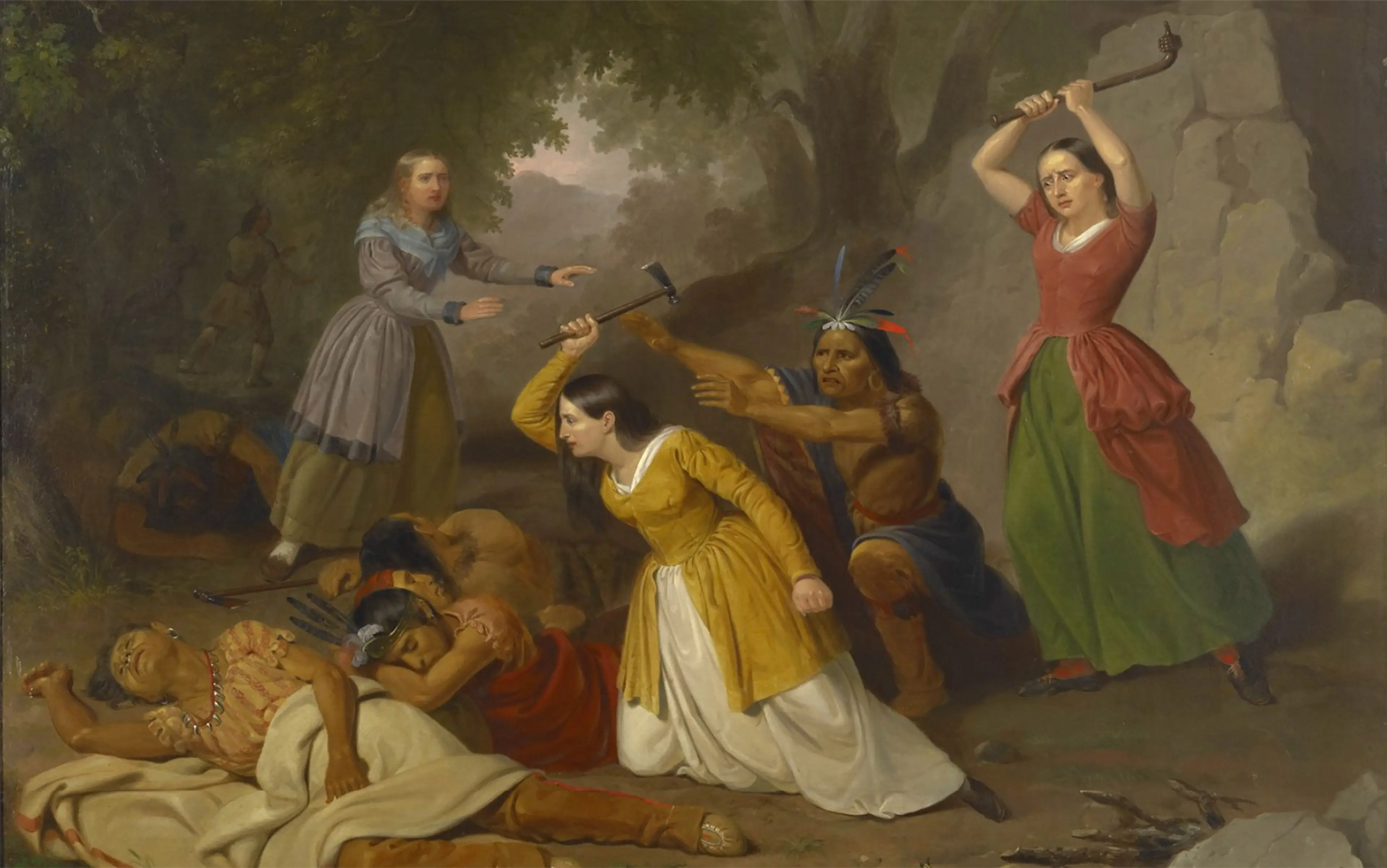
Hannah Duston Killing the Indians by Stearns, 1847

Junius Brutus Stearns (born Lucius Sawyer Stearns, June 2, 1810 – September 17, 1885) was an American painter best known for his five-part Washington Series (1847–1856).

He was a member of the National Academy of Design for several decades and a member of its council.

He was born Lucius Sawyer Stearns in Arlington, Vermont. He named two sons after him, one Lucius Stearns, and the other Junius Brutus Stearns, Jr. Stearns, Jr., served in the Civil War in the 44th Regiment. JB Stearns served in the Civil War as well, in New York's 12th Regiment. He also had two other sons, Raphael and Michaelangelo, and a daughter, Edith Sylvia.

His painting The Millennium was submitted as credentials for his admission as a member of the National Academy of Design.

== Death ==
He died September 17, 1885, in Brooklyn, New York, in a horse-and-carriage accident after returning from a night at the theatre. He was 75 years old and was interred at Cypress Hills Cemetery in Brooklyn.

== Paintings ==
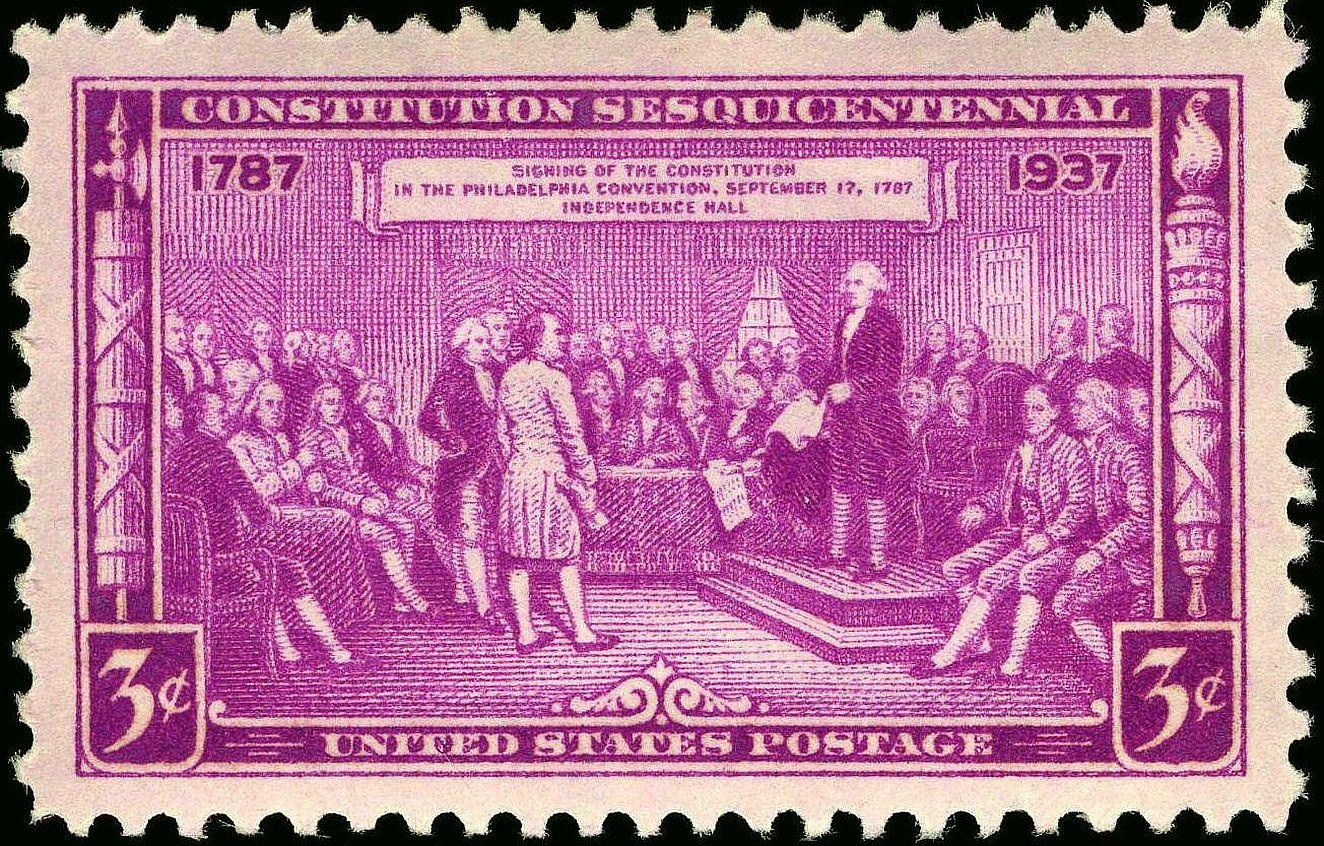
150th Anniversary of Signing, engraving after Stearns painting

Stearns is most famous for his series on George Washington. Of these his painting, Washington as a Statesman, depicts President Washington addressing the Constitutional Convention; it is the subject of a US Postage Stamp in 1937. From February 14 - July 26, 2026, the Virginia Museum of Fine Arts exhibited Titus Kaphar and Junius Brutus Stearns: Pictures More Famous than the Truth which “juxtapose[d] famous 19th-century paintings of George Washington with contemporary portraits and sculptural works that offer 21st-century perspectives of those same subjects.” The exhibit brought together five Stearns paintings from 1849 to 1856 for the first time.

Stearns also painted a second series of Washington in which he depicted free blacks. Not as much is known about this series or the intentions of the artist in so portraying blacks on the eve of the Civil War, although there was supposition by Mack, et al.

Stearns' painting, Hannah Duston Killing the Indians (1847) depicts the killing by Hannah Duston of Indians who had captured her and murdered her newborn daughter in 1697. In the painting Stearns, for reasons that remain unclear, depicts Samuel Lennardson (Duston's fellow captive) as a woman. The six Indian children Duston killed are omitted. A second painting, showing Hannah's husband fleeing with her children, is now lost.
