= The Infant Bacchus =

Painting by Giovanni Bellini

Young Bacchus
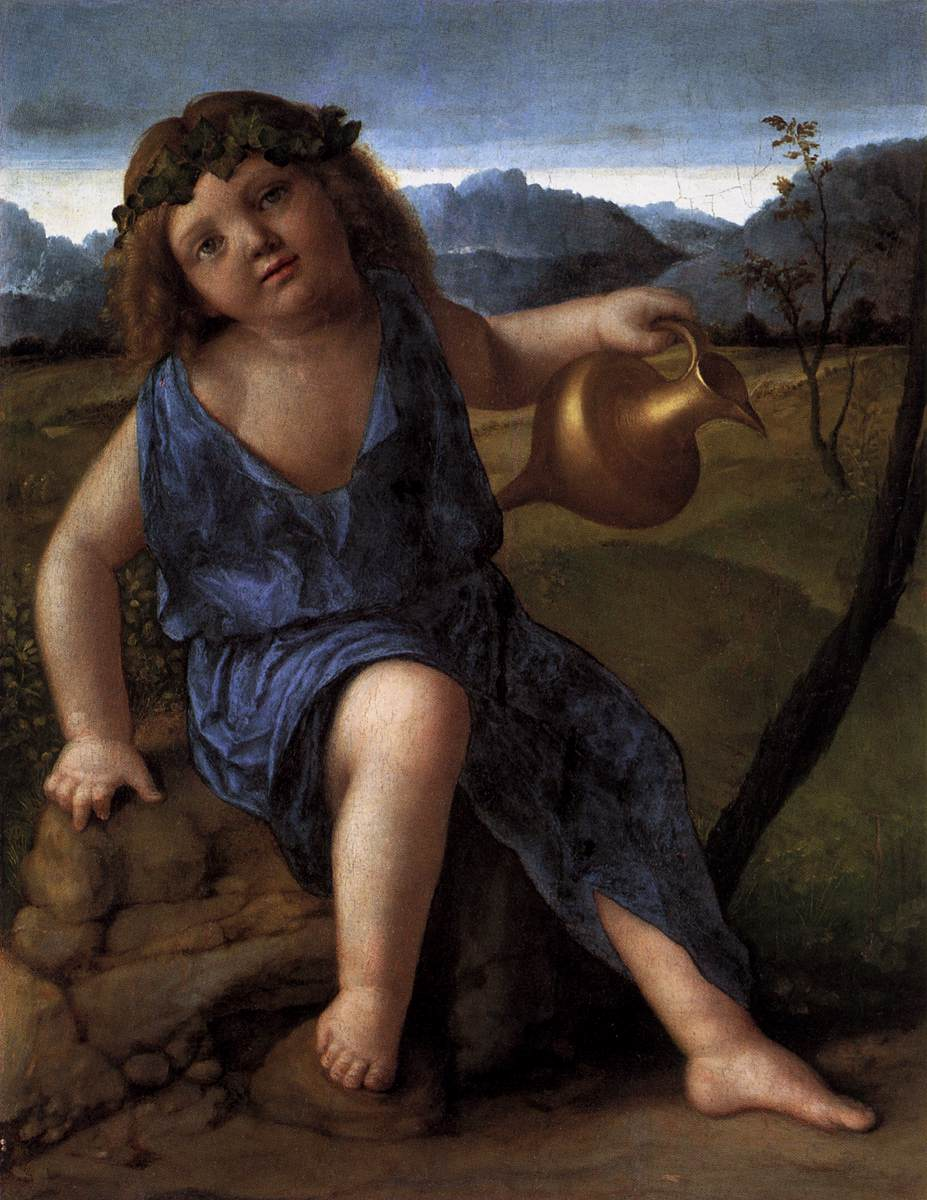
- Artist: Giovanni Bellini
- Year: c. 1505–1510
- Medium: oil on panel, later transferred to canvas
- Dimensions: 50 cm × 39 cm (20 in × 15 in)
- Location: National Gallery of Art, Washington, D.C.

The Infant Bacchus or Young Bacchus is a ca. 1505–1510 painting of the Roman god Bacchus as a boy by the Italian Renaissance master Giovanni Bellini. Originally painted on panel, it was later transferred to canvas.

It was probably the Little Bacchus with a vase in his hand seen in Bartolo Delfino's house in Venice by Carlo Ridolfi in the mid-16th century and misidentified as a Giorgione. Shipley (1979) believes the subject is a metaphor for the winter solstice, based on a letter in Macrobius's Saturnalia, known during the Renaissance – the new year started as a baby and ended as an old man. It may be drawn from the same studies as the figure of Bacchus in The Feast of the Gods, which is very similar.

By the 19th century it was in Frederick Richards Leyland's collection in London, where it was thought to be by Marco Basaiti. It passed through several further collections before being acquired by the Duveen Brothers in 1927, who took it to the United States. There it was acquired by Samuel H. Kress, who in 1961 gave it to the National Gallery of Art in Washington, D.C., where it still hangs.

== See also ==
- List of works by Giovanni Bellini
