= The Bacchanal of the Andrians =

Figure painting by Titian

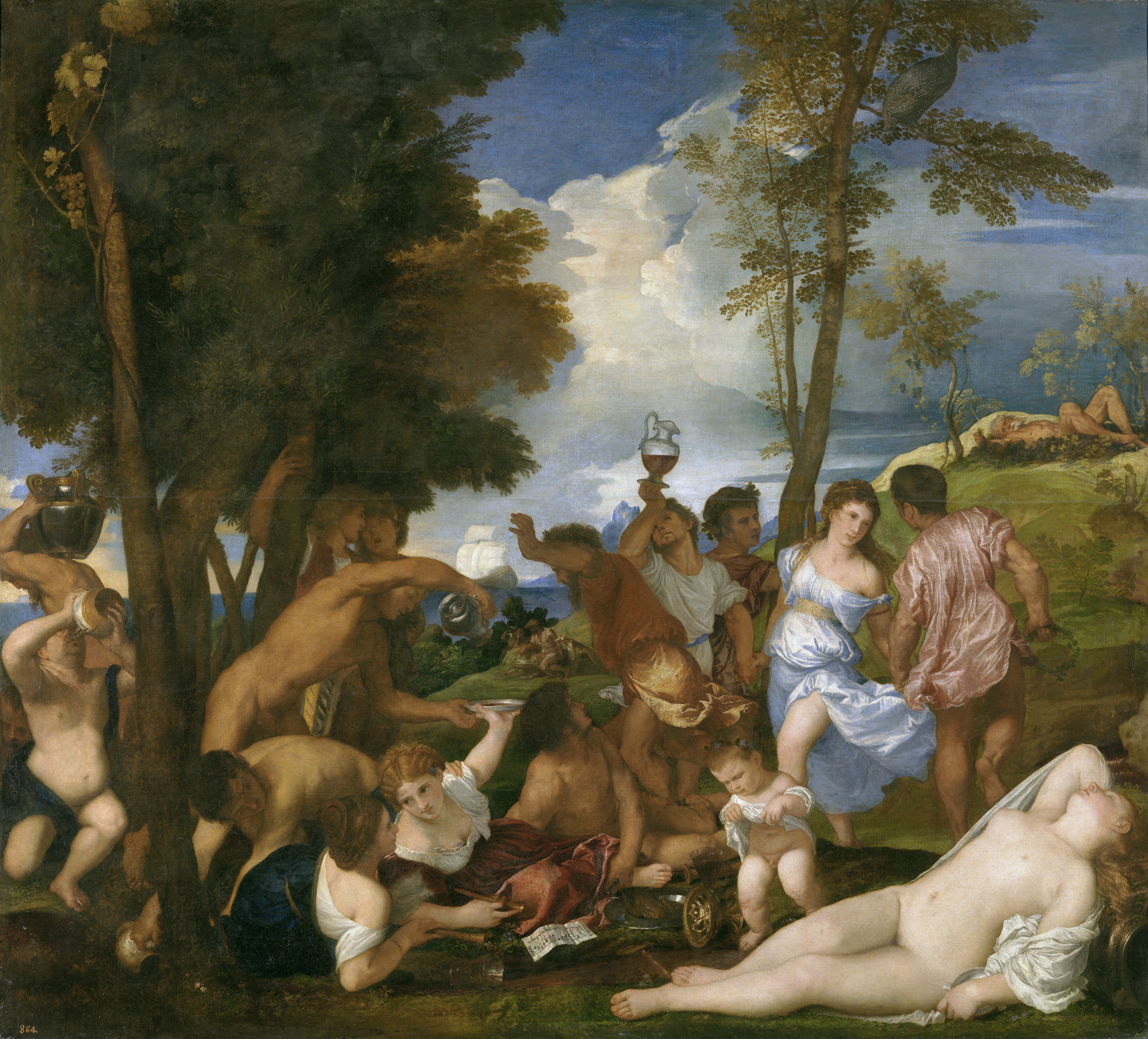
- Artist: Titian
- Year: 1523–1526
- Medium: oil on canvas
- Dimensions: 175 cm × 193 cm (69 in × 76 in)
- Location: Museo del Prado; Madrid

The Bacchanal of the Andrians or The Andrians is an oil painting by Titian. It is signed "TICIANUS F.[aciebat]" and is dated to 1523–1526.

== History ==
The painting was made by Titian for the Sala dei Baccanali in the Camerini d'alabastro for Alfonso I d'Este, after The Worship of Venus (1518–1519) and Bacchus and Ariadne (1520–1523) and Titian's intervention on The Feast of the Gods by Bellini in 1524–1525 where he retouched the landscape to match the style of the other paintings.

In 1598, control of Ferrara passed to the Papal State and the Este family had to withdraw to Modena. During the transfer, cardinal and papal legate Pietro Aldobrandini appropriated many paintings, among which were The Bacchanal and The Worship of Venus. Aldobrandini never exhibited the taken paintings. His theft only became known in 1629 after the paintings had come into the Ludovisi inheritance and then were sold to the Duke of Monterrey in payment of the Principality of Piombino. They were then donated to Philip IV of Spain in 1639. The first documentation of the paintings in Spain date to the inventories of the Royal Alcázar of Madrid in 1666, 1686, and 1700.

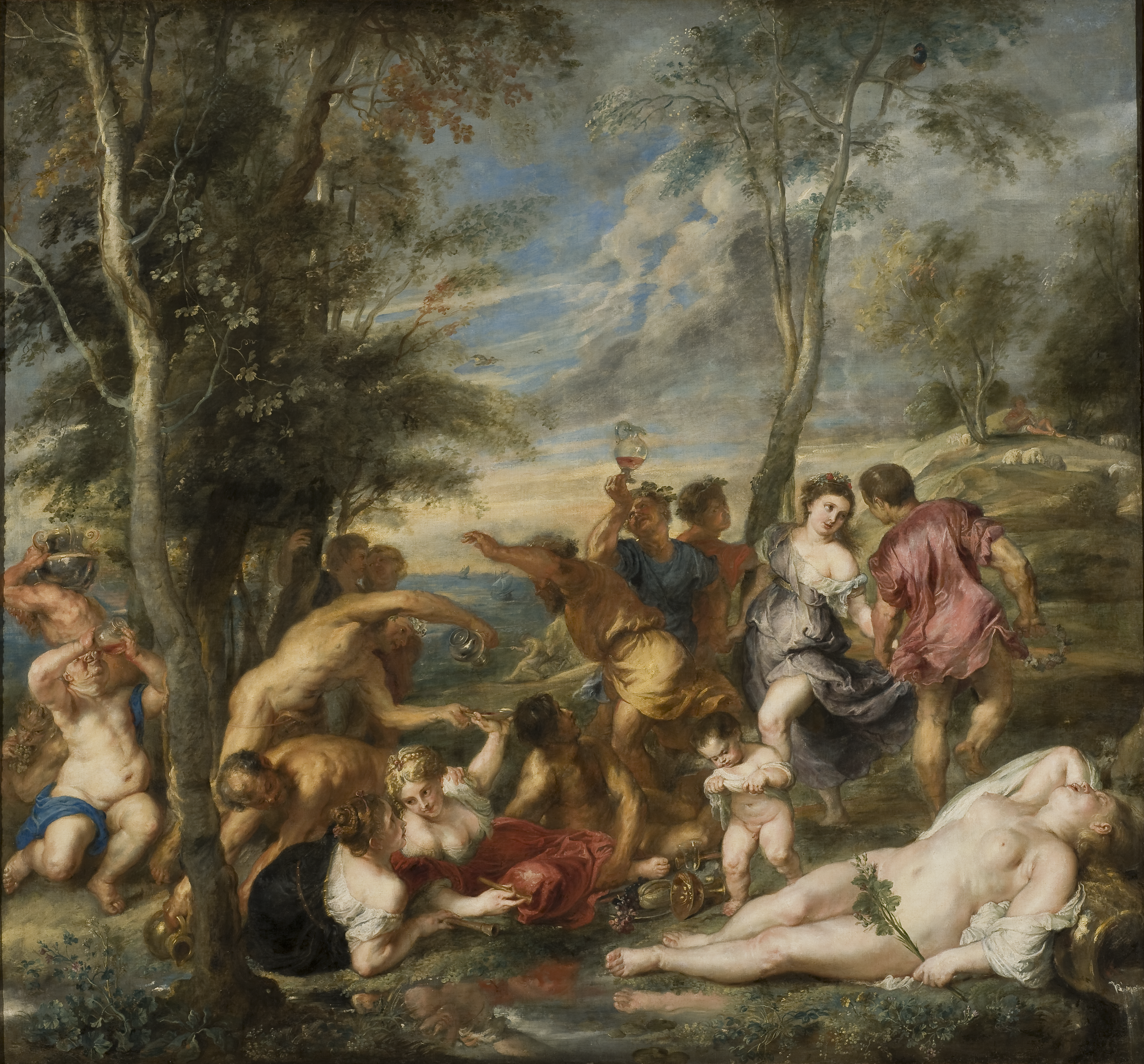
A Rubens copy of The Bacchanal

The three canvases of Titian were admired and copied as much in Italy as in Spain by artists like Pieter Paul Rubens, Guido Reni, Nicolas Poussin, and Diego Velázquez, and they contributed to the development of the Baroque style. Rubens' copies of The Bacchanal are housed at the Nationalmuseum in Stockholm. The Italian artist Domenichino famously wept upon hearing that the masterpieces had left Italy.

In 1782, British painter Joshua Reynolds admired The Bacchanal, which inspired him to draw a parallel between Titian and the Latin poet Virgil:

"What was said of Virgil, that he threw even filth about the ground with an air of dignity, may be applied to Titian; whatever he touched, however naturally mean and habitually familiar, by a kind of magic he invested with grandeur and importance."

The painting is now held at the Museo del Prado in Madrid.

== Description and style ==
=== Mythology ===
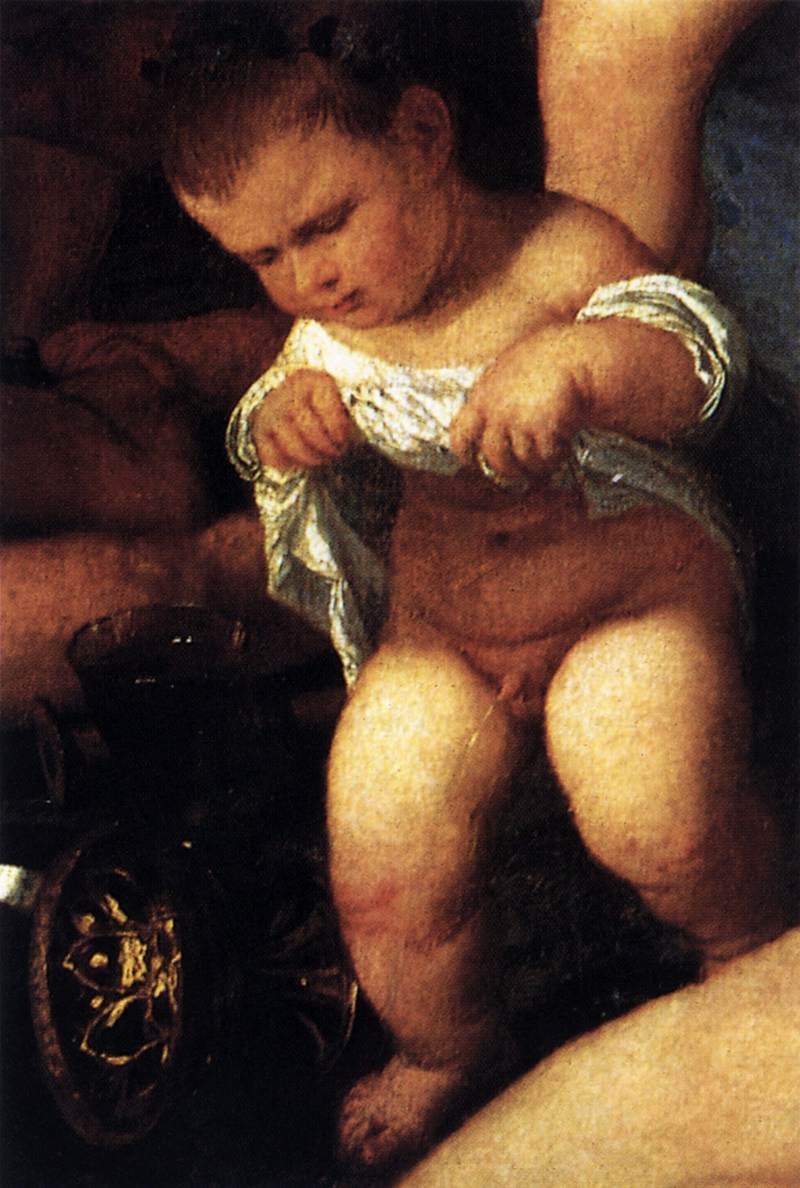
Detail of a putto

The painting is set on the island of Andros. A sleeping nymph and a urinating boy are seen in the lower right foreground while men and women celebrate with jugs of wine. The absence of Bacchus from the painting is explained by Erwin Panofsky, who suggests that the god must be on the departing ship seen in the center background. Due to the artistic liberties Titian took in painting these figures, it is difficult to identify them.

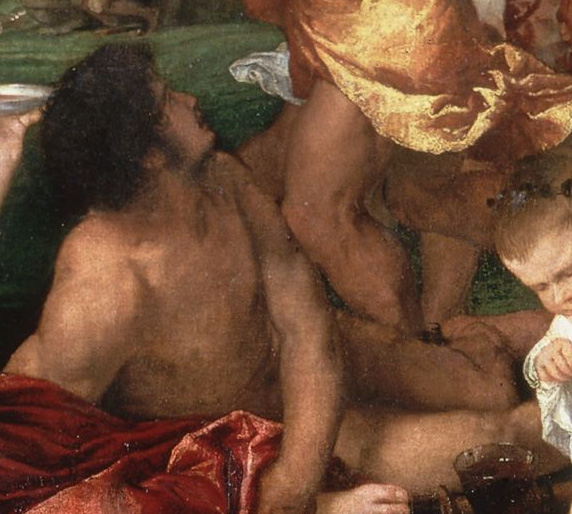
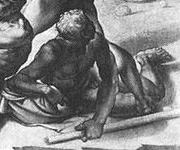
Comparison with the soldier in the copy of Battle of Cascina by Michelangelo

The decorative programme included other major paintings celebrating Bacchus and Venus, the gods of wine and love. Like its predecessor Bacchus and Ariadne, The Bacchanal of the Andrians was inspired by the Imagines of Philostratus.

=== Characters ===
In the foreground, to the right there is the sensual nude of a nymph-bacchante with light complexion, an educated citation of the Sleeping Ariadne, with the right elbow raised and the arm bent behind the head, a convention used to represent the sleep. She, wrote Vasari, "is so beautiful to appear alive". A little behind a puer mingens raises up his tunic, "pees in a river and reflects himself in water", as always Vasari described him, while at the center two young girls chatter lying on the ground, enlightened by full light. One of them, without turning, raises up her plate, in which a nude man pours wine from a pitcher. Another man is touching with impunity her ankle, but he's also turning his face to a dancer who seems about to stumble: he cites faithfully a character from the Battle of Cascina of Michelangelo, who is visible below to the right in the copy of Aristotile da Sangallo. In spite of the gesture the man and the woman seem to ignore each other: the strong sense of beauty and joy, even erotic, is never disturbed by vulgar attitudes. To the left an overweight man, who resembles Silenus, is kneeling half-nude and drinks with pleasure from a pitcher, just filled from the wine river, from which also a boy is drawing. In the background, under the shadow of a wood, a servant (who is holding on his shoulders a spirals krater full of wine) and two singers are visible. A little to the right there is the dancers group, in which stand out both a man who is trying to do the juggler by holding a transparent jug full of wine on the tip of his fingers and the couple in full light, the clothes of whom are lighted with shining reflections of matter. The youngster seen from behind is holding an ivy crown, plant sacred to Dionysus, while the other sacred plant, the vine, is visible upward, rooted among the trees fronds. The female dancer wearing a white tunic resembles the woman in red in the center of the scene, who also remind of the presumed mistress of Titian, i.e. the blond woman with curly hair appearing for example also in the two paintings Flora (Titian) and Woman with a Mirror. The violets between the hair of the central female figure might be a reference to the name Violante: a tradition states as a matter of fact that Titian's mistress was Palma il Vecchio's daughter, who was exactly called so.

=== Music ===
The musical score lying in the foreground, suggesting a link between music and Dionysian pleasures, is a whimsical canon in French:

French: Qui boyt et ne reboyt il ne scet que boyre soit.
English: Who drinks and does not drink again does not know what drinking is.

The song is attributed to Ferrarese court musician Adrian Willaert. Its presence in the painting hints at the connection between music theory in Ferrara and Titian's musically influenced use of color.

In the painting, however, none of the instruments are being played. The only instruments portrayed are the "straight flute". Two are held by the girls in the foreground, and a third is on the ground behind them and near a glass of wine, an overturned metal cup, and a tray of libations.

== See also ==
- List of works by Titian
- Renaissance banquet
- 100 Great Paintings, 1980 BBC series
