= Lead-tin yellow =

Yellow pigment used in oil painting

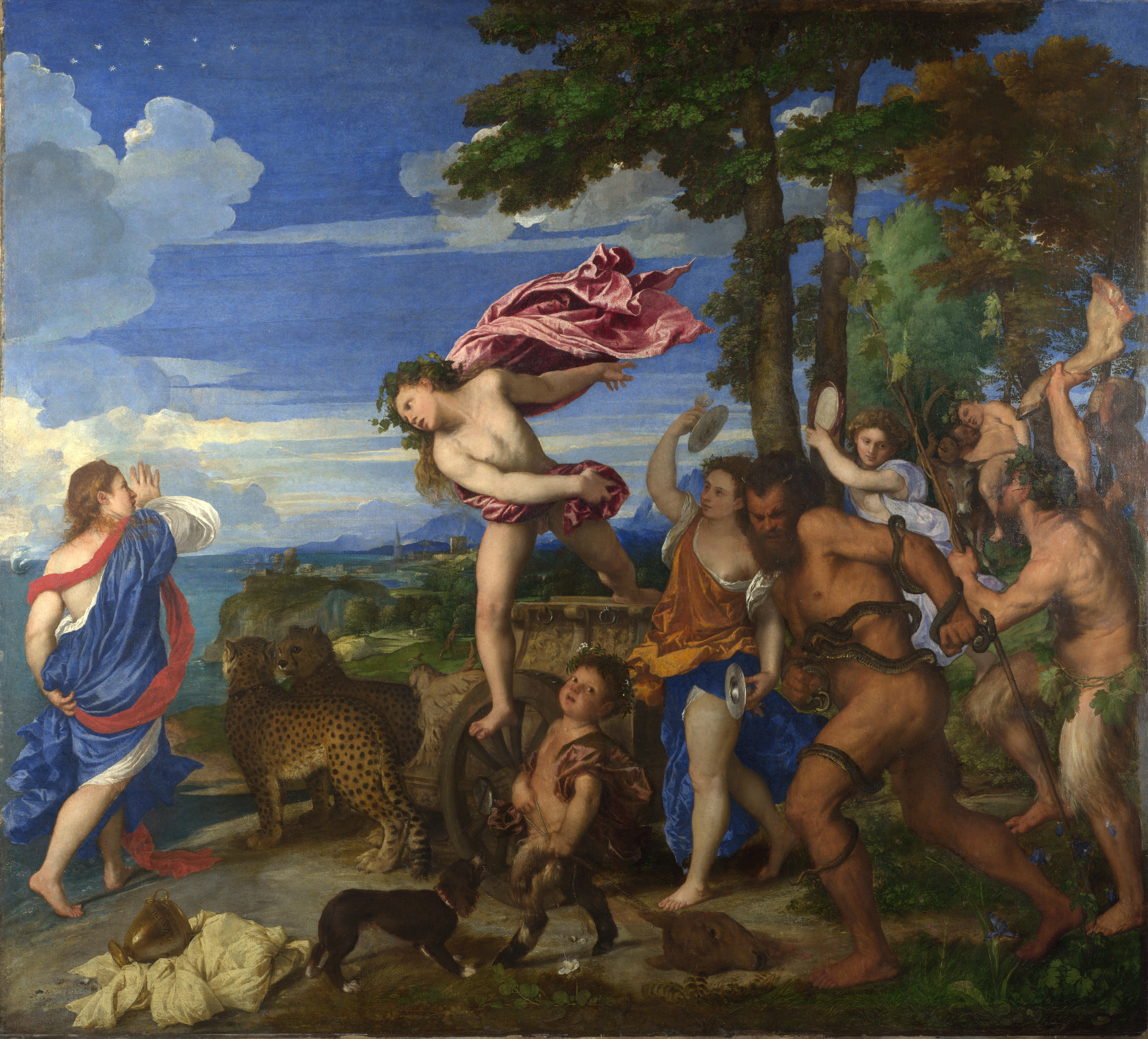
Titian, Bacchus and Ariadne, 1523

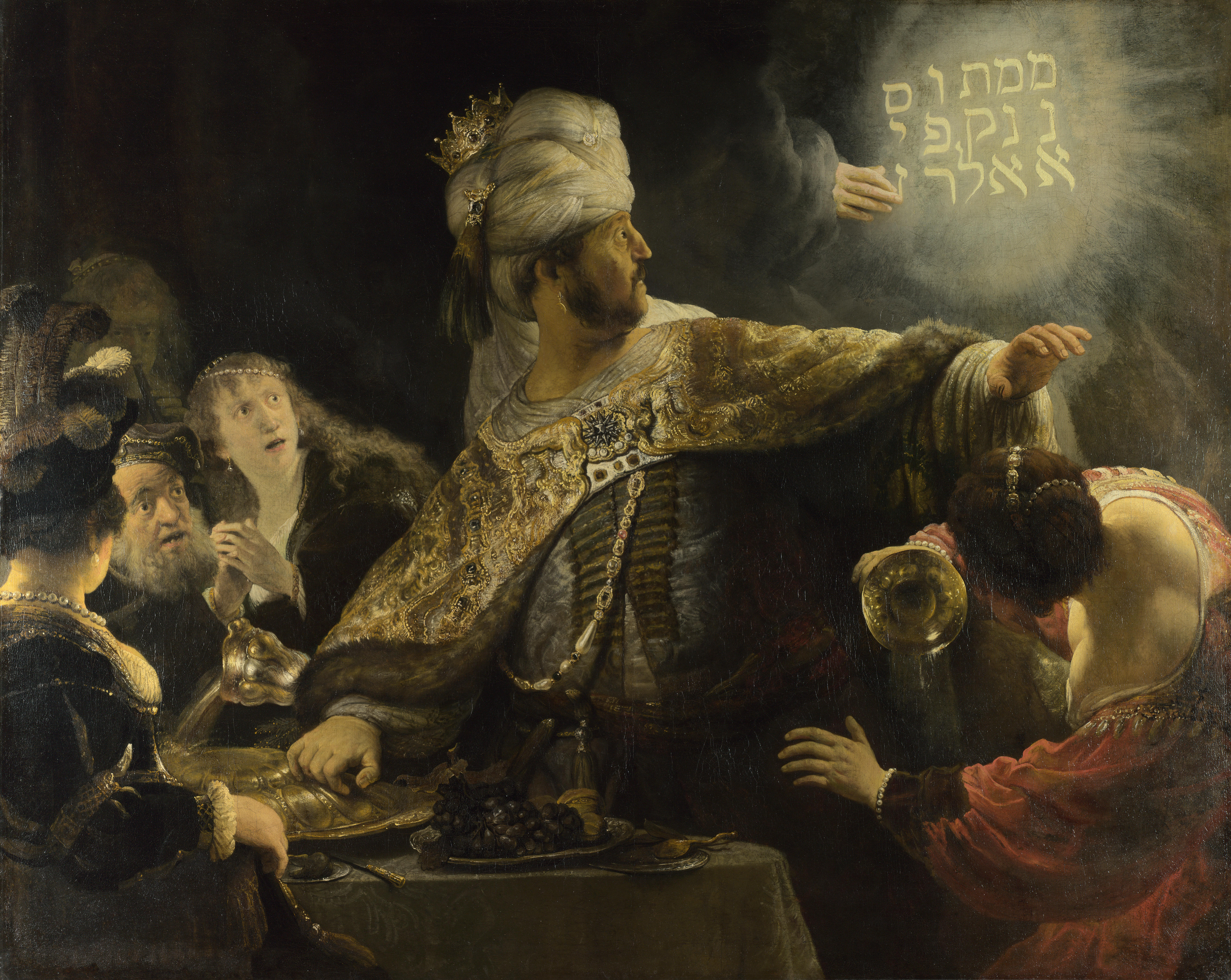
Rembrandt van Rijn, Belshazzar's Feast, 1635

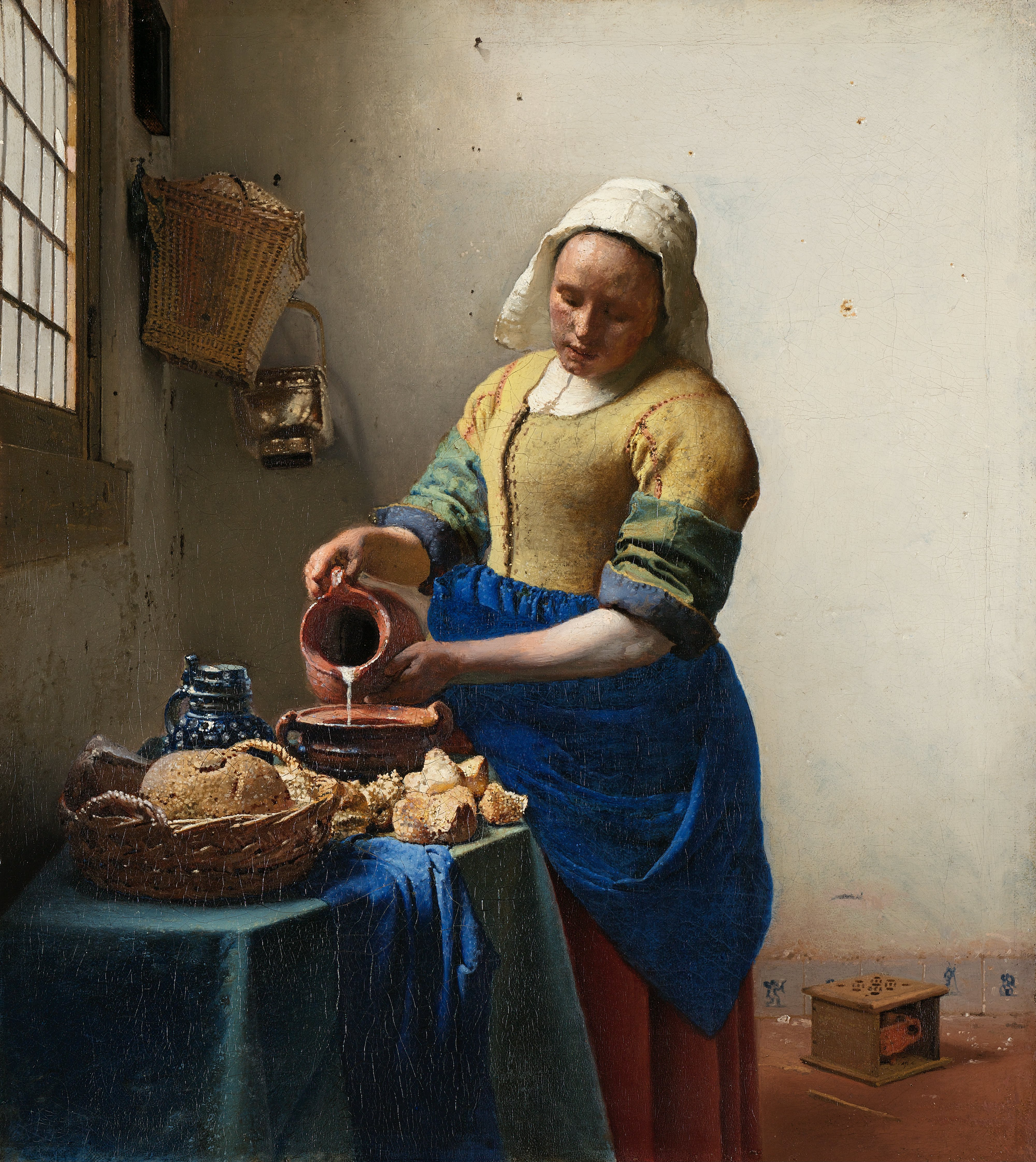
Johannes Vermeer, The Milkmaid, 1657-58

Lead-tin yellow is a yellow pigment, of historical importance in oil painting, sometimes called the "Yellow of the Old Masters" because of the frequency with which it was used by those famous painters.

== Nomenclature ==
The name lead-tin yellow is a modern label. During the thirteenth to eighteenth centuries when it was in widest use, it was known by a variety of names. In Italy, it was giallorino or giallolino. In other countries of Europe, it was massicot, genuli (Spanish), Plygal (German), general (English) or mechim (Portuguese). All of these names were often applied to other yellow pigments as well as lead-tin yellow.

== Composition ==
Lead-tin yellow historically occurred in two varieties. The first and more common one, today known as "Type I", was a lead stannate, an oxide of lead and tin with the chemical formula Pb_{2}SnO_{4}. The second, "Type II", was a silicate with the formula Pb(Sn,Si)O_{3}. Lead-tin yellow was produced by heating a powder mixture of lead oxide and tin oxide to about 900 °C. In "Type II" the mixture also contained quartz. Its hue is a rather saturated yellow. The pigment is opaque and lightfast. As a type of lead paint, it presents the hazard of lead poisoning if ingested, inhaled, or contacted.

== History ==
The origin of lead-tin yellow can be dated back to at least the thirteenth century when Type II was applied in frescos, perhaps having been discovered as a by-product of crystal glass production. Until the eighteenth century, Type I was the standard yellow used in oil painting.

Lead-tin yellow was widely employed in the Renaissance by painters such as Titian (Bacchus and Ariadne), Bellini (The Feast of the Gods) and Raphael (Sistine Madonna), and during the Baroque period by Rembrandt (Belshazzar's Feast), Vermeer (The Milkmaid), and Diego Velázquez (Apollo in the Forge of Vulcan).

In the early eighteenth century, lead-tin yellow was almost completely replaced in use by Naples yellow. After 1750, no paintings seem to have been made containing the pigment, and its existence was eventually forgotten for reasons that are not entirely clear. Lead-tin yellow was rediscovered in 1941 by the German scientist Richard Jakobi, then-director of the Doerner Institute. Jakobi called it Blei-Zinn-Gelb; the English "lead-tin yellow" is a literal translation of the German term.

After 1967, Hermann Kühn in a series of studies proved its general use in the traditional oil technique of earlier centuries, coining the distinction between the Type I and Type II varieties.

== Conjecture about disappearance ==
One prominent hypothesis for its disappearance from collective memory is confusion with other yellow pigments like massicot. Lead-tin yellow was sometimes called massicot, although it is a different substance. Prior to the development of modern analytical tools allowing for microscopic testing of paint, it was not always possible for art historians to distinguish between similar pigments, meaning that most yellow pigment containing lead was generally labeled Naples yellow.

Increased use of other pigments such as the less-opaque Naples yellow may also have displaced lead-tin yellow in common use. During the nineteenth century, after lead-tin yellow had vanished from common use, newer inorganic yellow pigments came into use, such as chrome yellow (lead chromate), cadmium sulfide, and cobalt yellow.

== See also ==
- List of inorganic pigments
