= Mario Equicola =

Italian Renaissance humanist

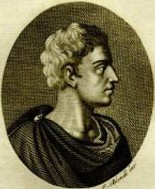
Mario Equicola

Mario Equicola (c. 1470 – 26 July 1525) was an Italian Renaissance humanist: a Neo-Latin author, a bibliophile, and a courtier of Isabella d'Este and Federico II Gonzaga. The National Gallery of Art describes him as "one of the Renaissance's most admired classical scholars".

== Life ==
Born at Alvito in or around 1470, Equicola was moved to Naples while still a boy. There he entered the Accademia Pontaniana as a young man. He later moved on to Florence, where he studied under Marsilio Ficino and adopted his teacher's neoplatonism, and then to Mantua, to the court of Isabella and Federico. In 1511 Equicola wrote Isabella that he was continuing a stay in Ferrara at the court of Duke Alfonso her brother in order to prepare in writing six fabule (fables) or istorie (histories) to be painted for the decoration of one of the duke's rooms, the camerino d'alabastro (alabaster chamber). These paintings, among them The Feast of the Gods and Bacchus and Ariadne, were executed by Giovanni Bellini and Titian. Equicola's sources were extensive, both classical and contemporary; he may have been commissioned to allegorise the marriage of Alfonso and Lucrezia Borgia in 1501.

Equicola expressed an interest in contemporary vernacular poetry. He was one of the first scholars to bring attention to the innovations of the troubadours and traced the origins of vernacular poetry to them. He also was one of the first scholars to praise women as exceeding men in their excellence in his little treatise De mulieribus (About Women). In 1517 he accompanied his patroness on a pilgrimage to Saint-Maximin-la-Sainte-Baume, which took them through Provence, where he availed himself of the archives of Aix. Equicola's account of the trip survives. According to Equicola, what differentiated the troubadours from the Latin poets of antiquity was their respect for women: il modo de descrivere loro amore fu novo diverso de quel de antichi Latini, questi senza respecto, senza reverentia, senza timore de infamare sua donna apertamente scrivevano, "the mode of describing their [the troubadours'] love was new and different from that of the ancient Latins, who openly wrote without respect, without reverence, without fear of defaming their lady".

In his most famous work, written in Latin between 1494 and 1496, but not published until 1525 at Venice and then in Italian, the Libro de natura de amore, Equicola studied the metaphysics of love and the nature of poetic courtly love. The poets which Equicola studied for this work, and the different names by which he knew them depending on their language, are indicated by the section he entitled "Como Latini et Greci Poeti, Ioculari Provenzali, Rimanti Francesi, Dicitori Thoscani, & trovatori Spagnoli habiano loro Amante lodato & le passioni di loro stessi descritto". This Aristotelian work received severe criticism for its unscholarly approach and lack of structure, coherence, and purpose, but it was still widely disseminated and widely used, though rarely acknowledged. His views on love were credited as an influence by such figures as Agostino Nifo (De pulchro et amore), Giuseppe Betussi (Dialogo amoroso), and Lope de Vega (El maestro de danzar), however. According to Nesca A. Robb in Neoplatonism of the Italian Renaissance (London: Allen and Unwin, 1956), "it was poor Equicola's fate to be shamelessly pillaged by his fellow authors, and in the century after his death to be hounded from Parnassus by the irrepressible Boccalini."

Equicola indicated that Occitan and French poetry were rare in Italy but Spanish poetry widely read, being accessible through several circulating Neapolitan chansonniers. He was less than enthusiastic about this. He criticised the Spanish poet Juan de Mena and followed Juan del Encina in arguing that rhyme entered Spain from Italy.

Around 1505 Equicola penned Nec spe nec metu ("Neither in hope nor in fear"), a book analysing Isabella's favourite saying. He was an ally of Isabella's during the conflict with her son, Federigo, that erupted in her later years. He died at Mantua before its resolution.

== Works ==
- Marii Equicoli Olivetani de mulieribus ad D. Margaritam Cantelmam. (circa 1501)
- Nec spe nec metu. Dialogus ad Iulianum Medicem (Mantua: Francesco Bruschi, 1513)
- Ad inuictissimum principem d. Maximilianum Sforciam ducem Mediolani (Rome: Marcello Silber, 1513)
- In conseruatione diuae Osanne Andreasiae Mantuanae oratio ad d. Isabella estensem Mantuae principem (Mantua: Francesco Bruschi, 1515)
- De bello Turcis inferendo (1519)
- Chronica di Mantua (Manuta, 1521)
- Libro de natura de amore di Mario Equicola secretario del illustrissimo S. Federico 2. Gonzaga marchese di Mantua (Venice: Lorenzo Lorio da Portes, 1525)
- Institutioni di Mario Equicola al comporre in ogni sorte'di Rima della lingua volgare, con vno eruditissimo Discorso della Pittura, & con molte segrete allegorie circa le Muse & la Poesia (Milano: Francesco Minizio Calvo, 1541)
- Dell'Istoria di Mantoua libri cinque. Scritta in commentari da Mario Equicola D'Alueto. Nella quale cominciandosi dall’edificatione di essa citta, brevemente si raccontano le cose piu notabili succedute di tempo in tempo cosi in pace, come in guerra, (Mantua: Benedetto Osanna, 1607)
