= Renaissance banquet =

Renaissance social and cultural event

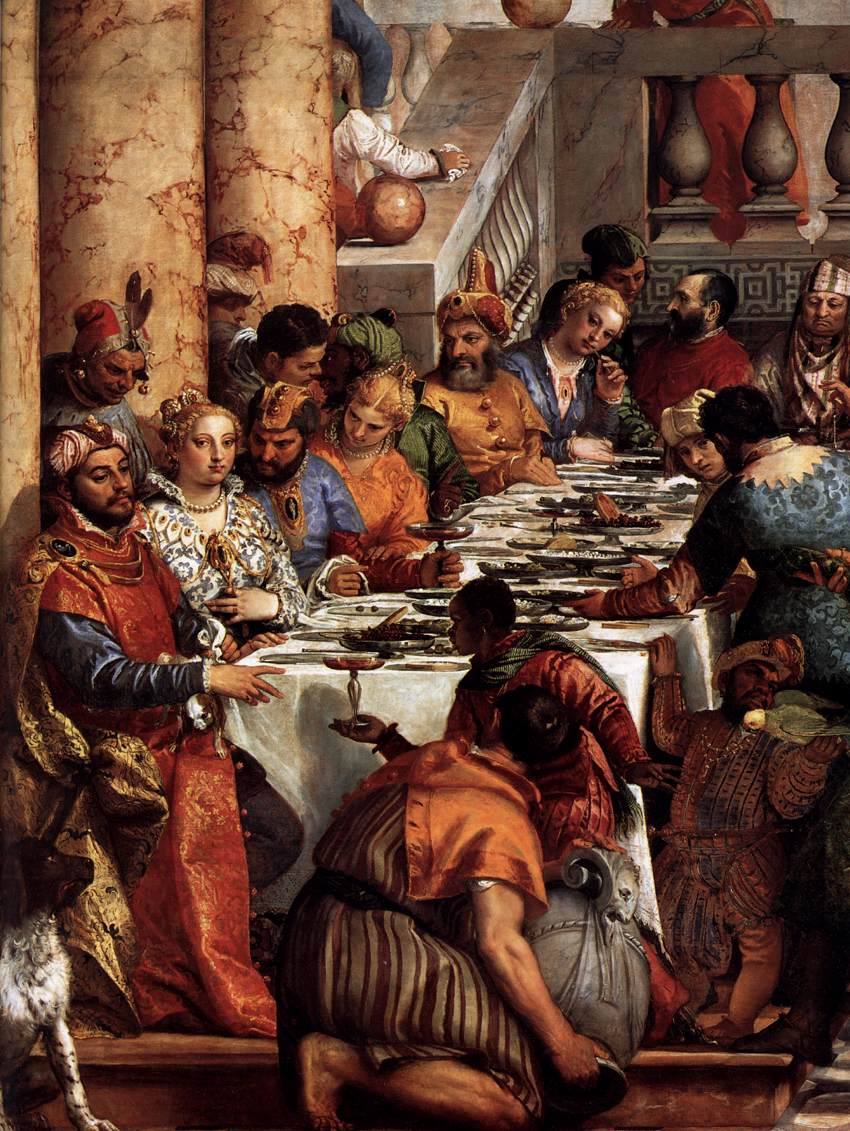
Paolo Veronese, The Wedding at Cana (detail), 1563

The Renaissance banquet is an art form that combines the taste of spectacle with music and dining. It was a representation of power expressed through the ostentation of the symbols of the table, through which the prince was exalted.

== Origins ==
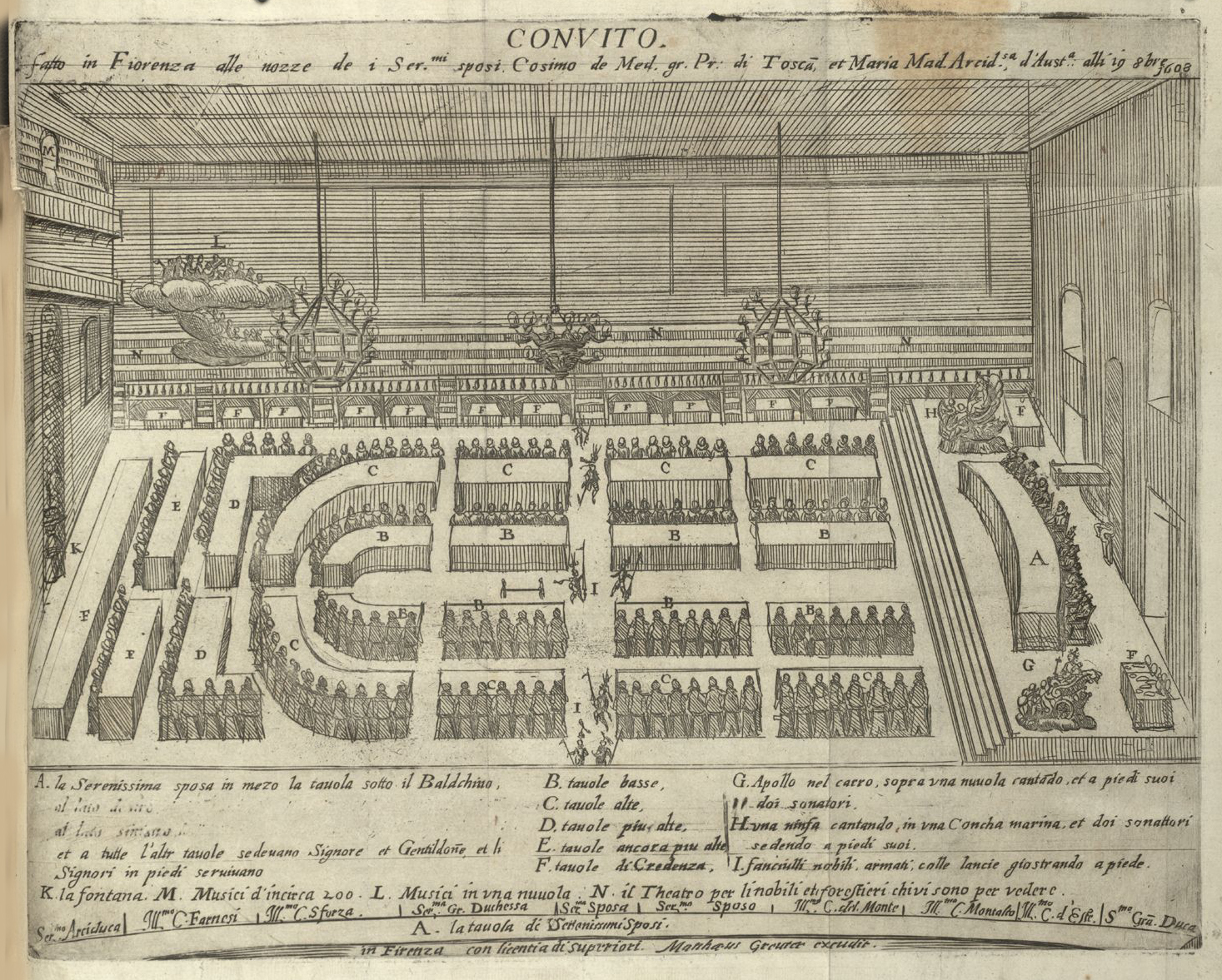
Table arrangement for the wedding of Cosimo II de' Medici and Maria Maddalena of Austria, in 1608.

This art form probably took shape in Naples and then spread to the courts of northern Italy with the marriage of Ercole I d'Este and Eleonora of Aragon. It then became more elaborated in the period between the reign of Ercole II and that of Alfonso II, the last Duke of Ferrara: at this time Ferrara was called “the first truly modern city in Europe.”

== Characteristics ==
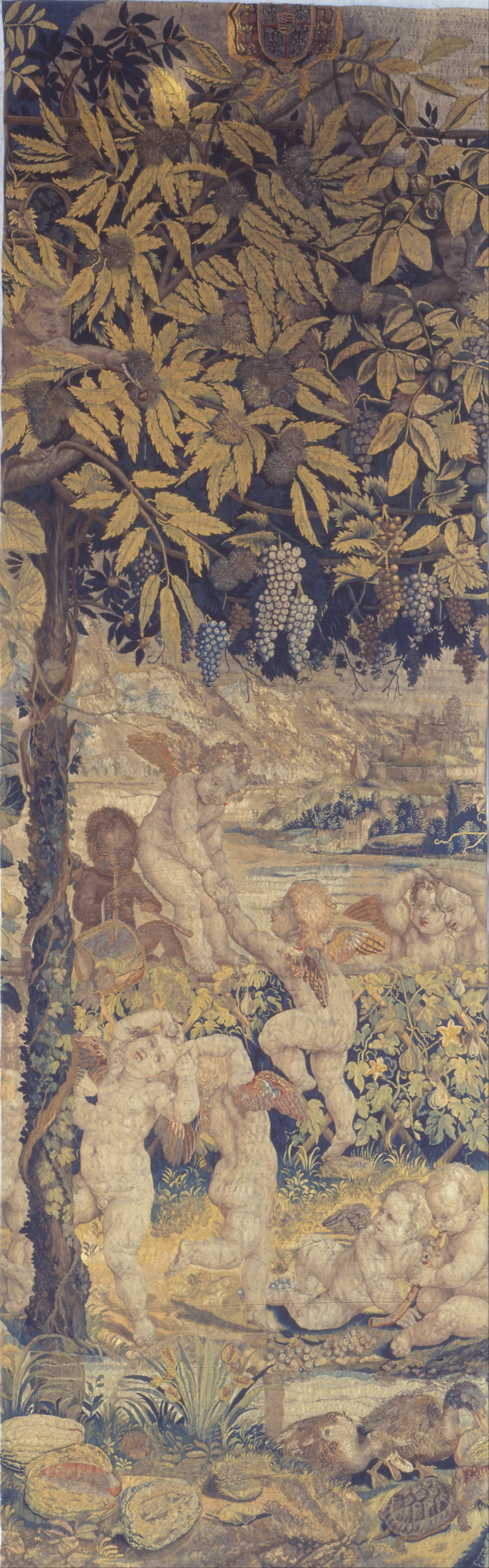
Giochi di putti, tapestry on cardboard by Giulio Romano, Museo Poldi Pezzoli.

In addition to arrangements and culinary compositions, the Renaissance banquet is characterized by the art of fine serving orchestrated by the “Mouth Bureau”, composed of the server, the carver, and the cupbearer, each held to a highly ritualized gesture. The figure of the carver was subject of real technical treatises, cutting meat and tasting the food. (Note: During the 16th century, Il refugio de povero gentiluomo by G.F. Colle (Ferrara, 1520) and Il trinciante by V. Cervio (Venice, 1581) were written.) The cupbearer, in charge of wine service, also had the skill of making credenza, that is, of ensuring that the drink was not poisoned. From this expression also derives the name credenza given to the display of the furnishings ready to be used in the banquet. Among all these crafts associated with the table, it is also important to note the figure of the dapìfero (food bearer).

The banquet was often preceded by a joust, a palio, a ring race, a game of goose or pork, masquerades, and morescas (when the feast was concomitant with the Carnival) or a procession with floats and triumphal arches through the city.

The halls of the palace were adorned in such a way as to create a scenario: just before the guests' arrival, tapestries, carpets, and worked leather were arranged in the hall, along with the arrangements that constituted the mobile decoration of the banquet, kept in the prince's wardrobe. This setting depicted rural subjects, perspectives of gardens and landscapes to which are added borders characterized by naturalistic motifs (vegetable, floral, or cherubs).

The beginning of the actual banquet was announced by the sound of trumpets and drummers that was repeated with each new course. It was customary to invite to the banquet an audience of spectators consisting of the bourgeoisie, artisans, and clergy. The meal was usually accompanied by music and theatrical performances. The number of courses could comprise hundreds of dishes.

== Setup ==
The first text that describes at length the setting of the table is found in the manual Il libro de cozina, written by Robert de Nola, in the early 16th century. In addition to the iconographic sources, the servers Cristoforo di Messisbugo, Giaccomo Grana, Vincenzo Cervio, and Giovan Battista Rossetti also provide chronicles.

Table and sideboard furnishings were often designed and made by well-known artists such as Leonardo da Vinci, Benvenuto Cellini, Titian, Giulio Romano, Andrea del Sarto, and others.

=== Table ===
The arrangements were all showpieces, particularly for wedding banquets such as the one made for the wedding of Alfonso II and Barbara of Austria in December 1565. In his book, Rossetti left us with, among others, a detailed description of the fabrics that played a primary role when the hall was transformed into a sea world with rocks and grottoes lined with “turquoise ermisino [a type of light silk fabric] and flakes of gold,” of the servers “all dressed in green velvet, and those who served the first courses, which were three, all embroidered with gold scales, the others with less expense,” of the tables with three tablecloths and an "over mantle, which did not fall from the bands, which was raised when the cold arose without betting anyone, was this over mantle all worked of very fine sea-wave cloth cymadure [sic], with various monsters on it." The napkins were folded “in the shape of various fishes with fine silver scales in various sea colors, which, towels rising, [ensured that] the underside towel remained clean and candid.”

The Carnival day was also an opportunity to hold banquets. According to the Compendio, (Note: Compendio generale de tutte le provisioni: it is a register consisting of 16 leaves in which C. Messisbugo presents in detail the accounting management of the years 1547-1548 of the court of Ercole II.) on February 14, 1548, the ducal table was illuminated by silver lamps suspended from the attic so as not to impede the view. In addition to the towels, the table was set with four silver salt shakers, and for each person a napkin and knife, a twisted bread, sugar, and egg yolks.

==== Cutlery ====
Silverware was widely used in the service. Indispensable furnishings of the dining room, the more expensive pieces were displayed outdoors on sideboards or placed on the first table, while for the furnishings and cutlery of the other tables, the materials used were cheaper (brass, iron, or pewter).

In the inventories of the postmortem possessions of princes, such as that of Giovanni Andrea Doria, hundreds of silver parade furnishings are enumerated, often with decorative shapes and motifs. There are almost always jugs with basins, cutlery, plates, cups, tumblers, fruit bowls, confetti boxes, salt cellars of all shapes, vases, flasks, bakers, sugar bowls, eggcups, warming racks, perfume boxes, candlesticks, etc. In the inventory of Cardinal Ercole Gonzaga's goods, each object is listed with its weight in silver (in brand, ounce, and money).

==== Ceramics ====
The ceramics used in the sideboards were obtained at majolica workshops located in Faenza and Urbino, where Alfonso II's second and third wedding sideboards were commissioned. It is possible to note the historiated majolica sideboard service created by Niccolò Pellipario (known as Nicola da Urbino) for Isabella d'Este.

==== Glassware ====
Venetian glassware (Isabella d'Este was a major customer of the Murano furnaces) was to remain, throughout the Renaissance, the favorite domestic furnishings of aristocratic palaces. Among the glassware found in canteens are the goblets, pilgrim flasks, chalices, cups, and plates in colored glass or pure crystal with enamel decoration. In the 16th century, glass supplies with filigree decoration were also in vogue, while in the second half of the 16th century, semi-opaque “ice” glass was favored in Renaissance mansions.

=== Cuisine ===
In Renaissance gastronomy, sugar (also called “Cyprus powder”) was considered a status symbol. It could coat and embellish various sorts of food, especially sweets, which were presented on the table in the form of works of jewelry. And, in choosing sugar, Castore Durante advised that the best should be “very white, grave, firm, and very hard to break.”

Throughout the banquet, the sweet, sour, and spicy flavors, obtained through condiments such as verjuice, dominated. Diverse kinds of feather or fur game were served, especially waders and fowl: highly sought after was the cormorant from the early 16th century, then, between 1555 and 1650, the swan, stork, heron, crane, and peacock. The river or fishpond provided fresh fish: highly prized were sturgeon and shad.

=== Wine ===
As for the wines served at the table, Messisbugo recommended making provisions of Malvasia, Racese (wine from Liguria), Magnaguerra (produced in Campania), Vernaccia, Trebbiano, Siruolo (wine from Marche), Tuscan Greco, Greco from Somma Vesuviana, Graspia, Corso (wine from Corsica), Sanseverino from Campania, and Roman Latino. Pope Paul III, a great oenophile, advised by his wine bottler Sante Lancerio, appreciated many wines, especially the wine of Monterano. In contrast, Ippolito d'Este preferred to offer French wines to his guests.

== Music ==
The meal is accompanied by musicians playing and singing, particularly to break the cadence of the very long succession of courses. In his Dialogues, Massimo Troiano informs about the different instruments and pieces played at the wedding festivities between William V of Bavaria and Renata of Lorraine: “For the first supper, the musicians played a motet by Orlando di Lasso, with five high cornets, and two trombones. And afterward by the sound of trumpets and tabalini, came out of the kitchen from the second supper [...] And the musicians played several works for six, and among others a very sweet madrigal by Alessandro Striggio, with six great trombones, in which in the bass goes eight voices lower than the other common ones, after which by the sound of trumpets and taballi was brought the third supper [... ] And there were rung various motets, and one among others by Cipriano de Rore with six violas; till the fourth course was brought [... ] And here various and very beautiful concerts were made, works by Annibale Padovano and other composers, with six violas, five trombones, a cornet [...] Then in the evening at the sumptuous dinner among other entertainments, Orlando di Lasso had a five-part opera sung by Signora Maddalena Casulana [...]” Other composers who made music for various festive occasions include Giovanni Pierluigi da Palestrina, Philippe de Monte, Costanzo Festa, Adrian Willaert, Alfonso della Viola, and Girolamo Parabosco.

The iconographic sources also present relevant musical details, particularly with the theme of the Wedding at Cana. For example, in Ferrara, six paintings (four declinations of the Wedding at Cana, a Supper at Simon's House, and a Banquet of Ahasuerus) of banquet scenes where musicians are depicted were made in three decades between the 16th and 17th centuries.

== Theatre ==
In addition to being acted for Holy Week and Carnival, the plays are also part of the interludes of the banquets. Well-known playwrights include Pietro Aretino, Ludovico Ariosto, and Ruzante, all intellectuals in the service of the courts. For the Este court of Ferrara, Ariosto, in addition to Orlando Furioso, wrote Plautus-inspired comedies such as La Cassaria and La Lena.

== Gallery ==
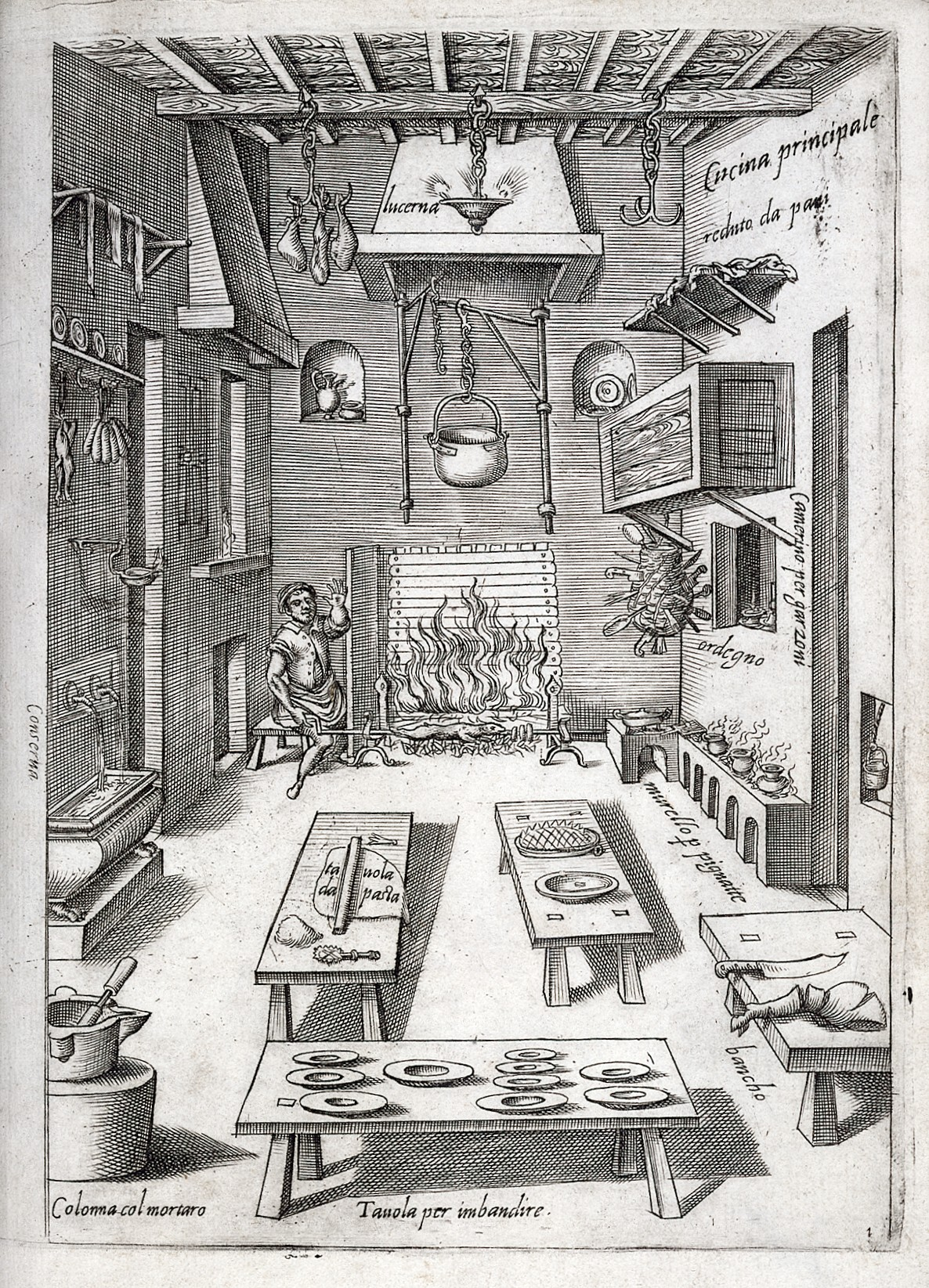
Kitchen drawing, 1570.

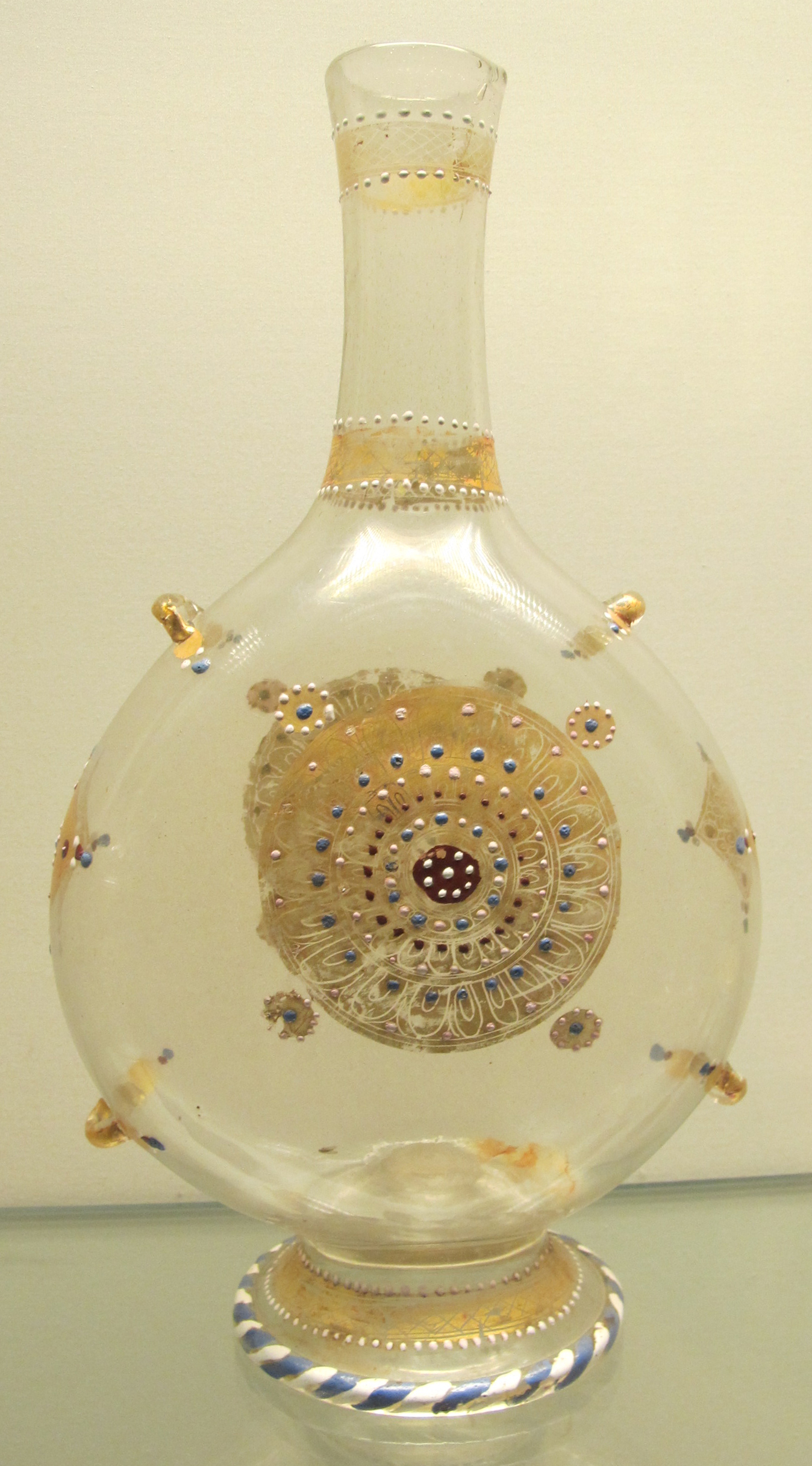
Glass flask, 16th-17th century.

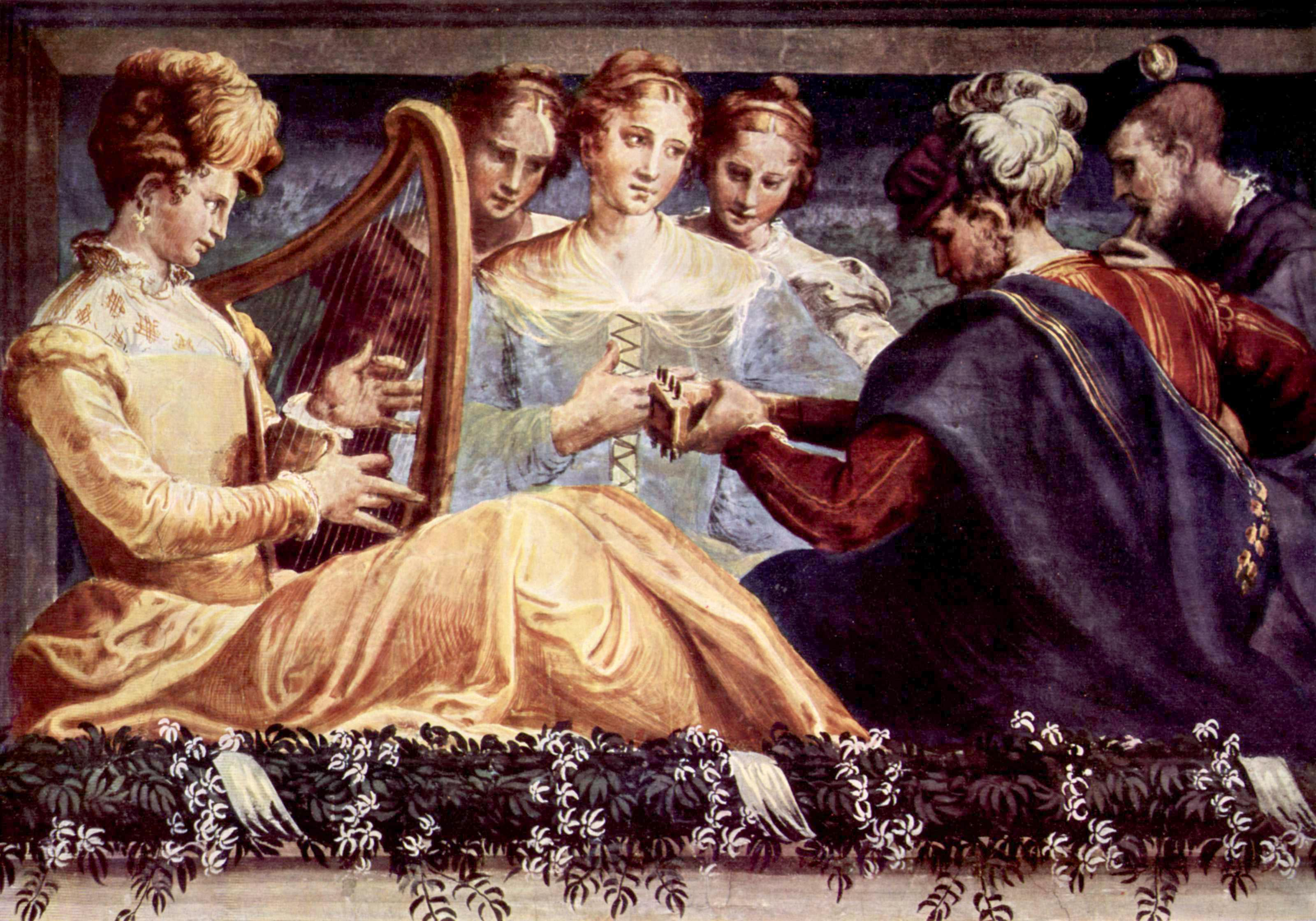
Nicolò dell'Abate, Il concerto, fresco, 1550, Palazzo Poggi.

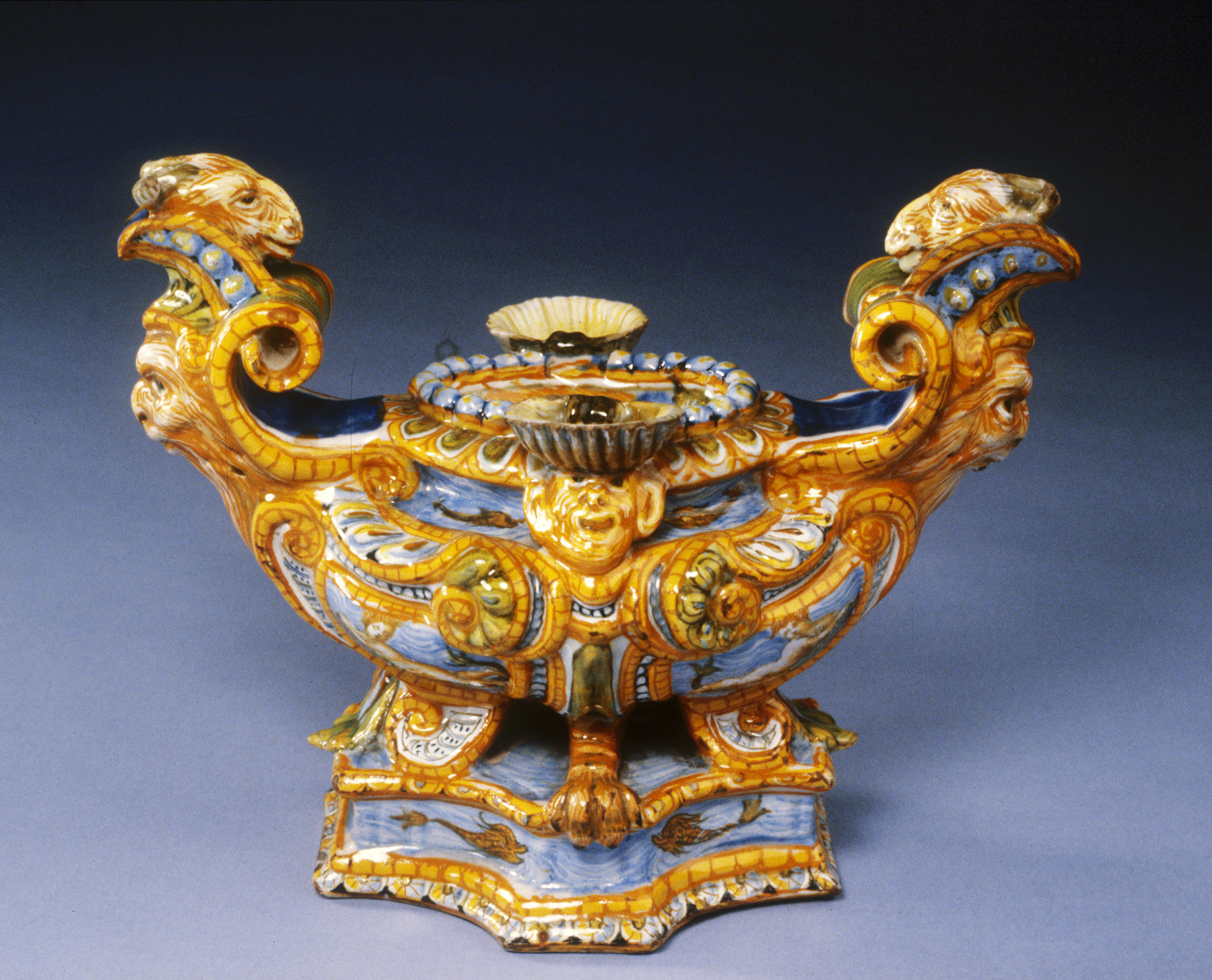
Boat-shaped salt cellar, 1579 c., Bottega dei Patanazzi, Urbino.

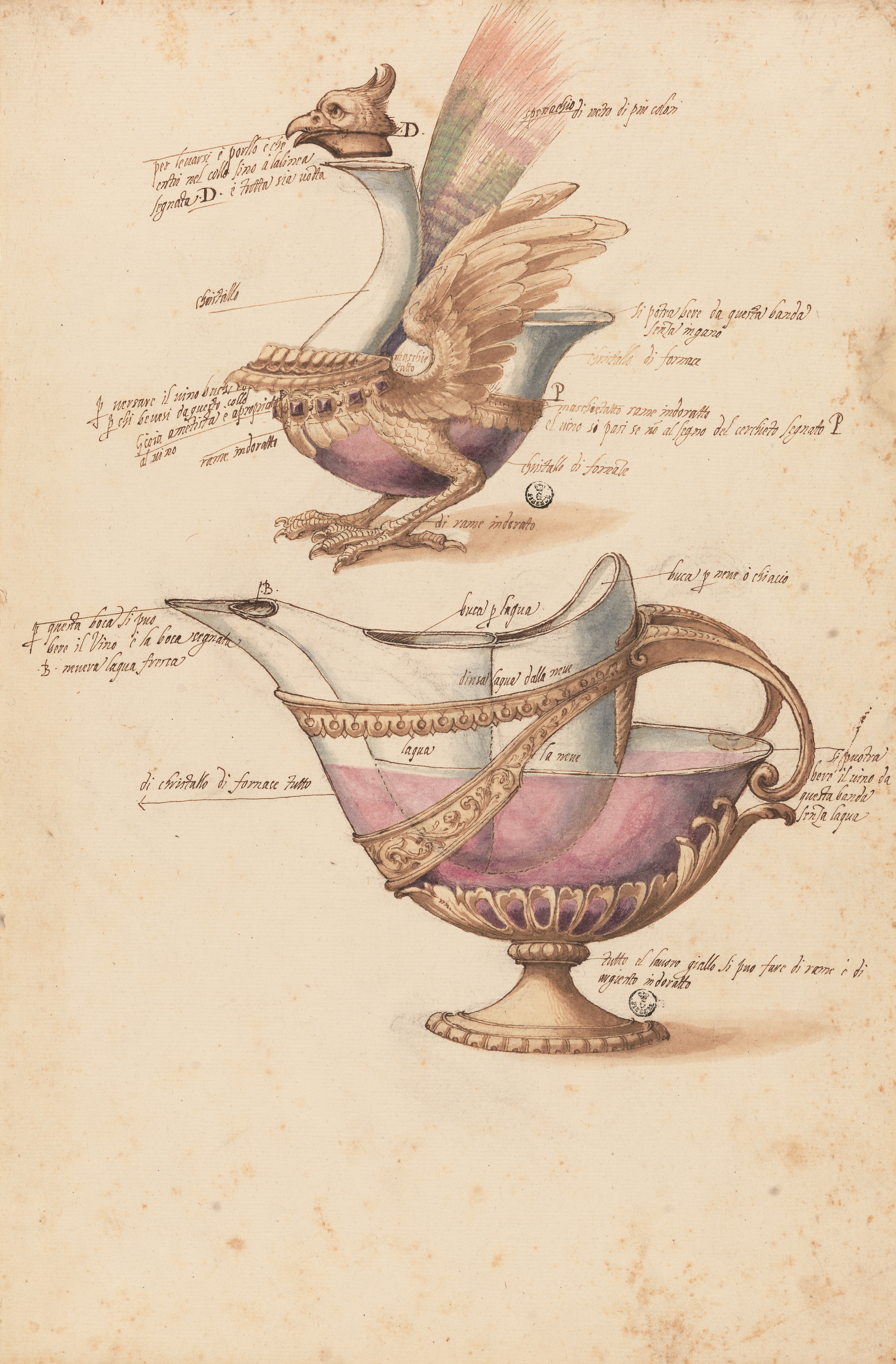
Novelty glassware by Jacopo Ligozzi.

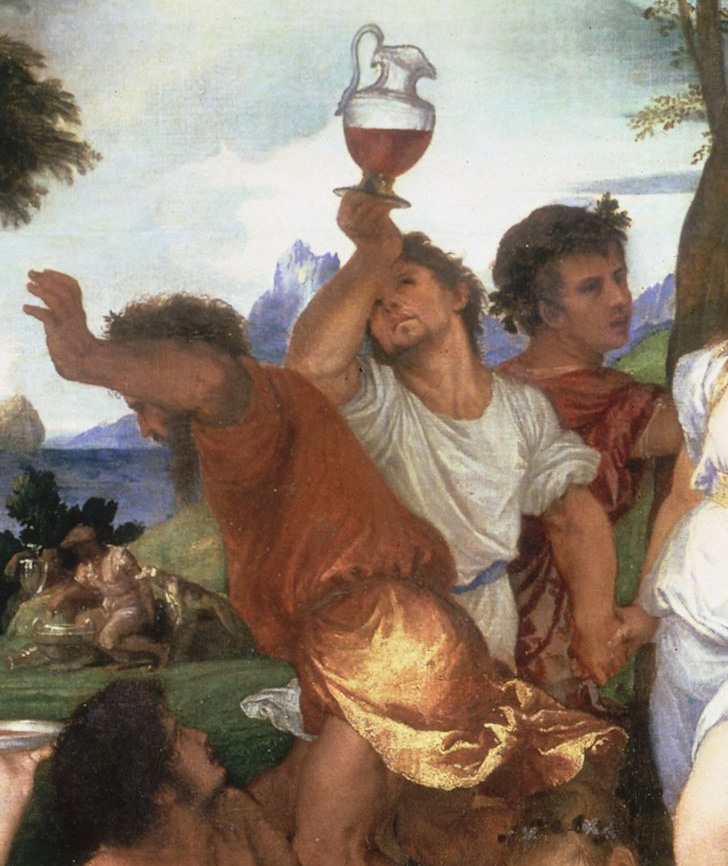
Tiziano, The Bacchanal of the Andrians.

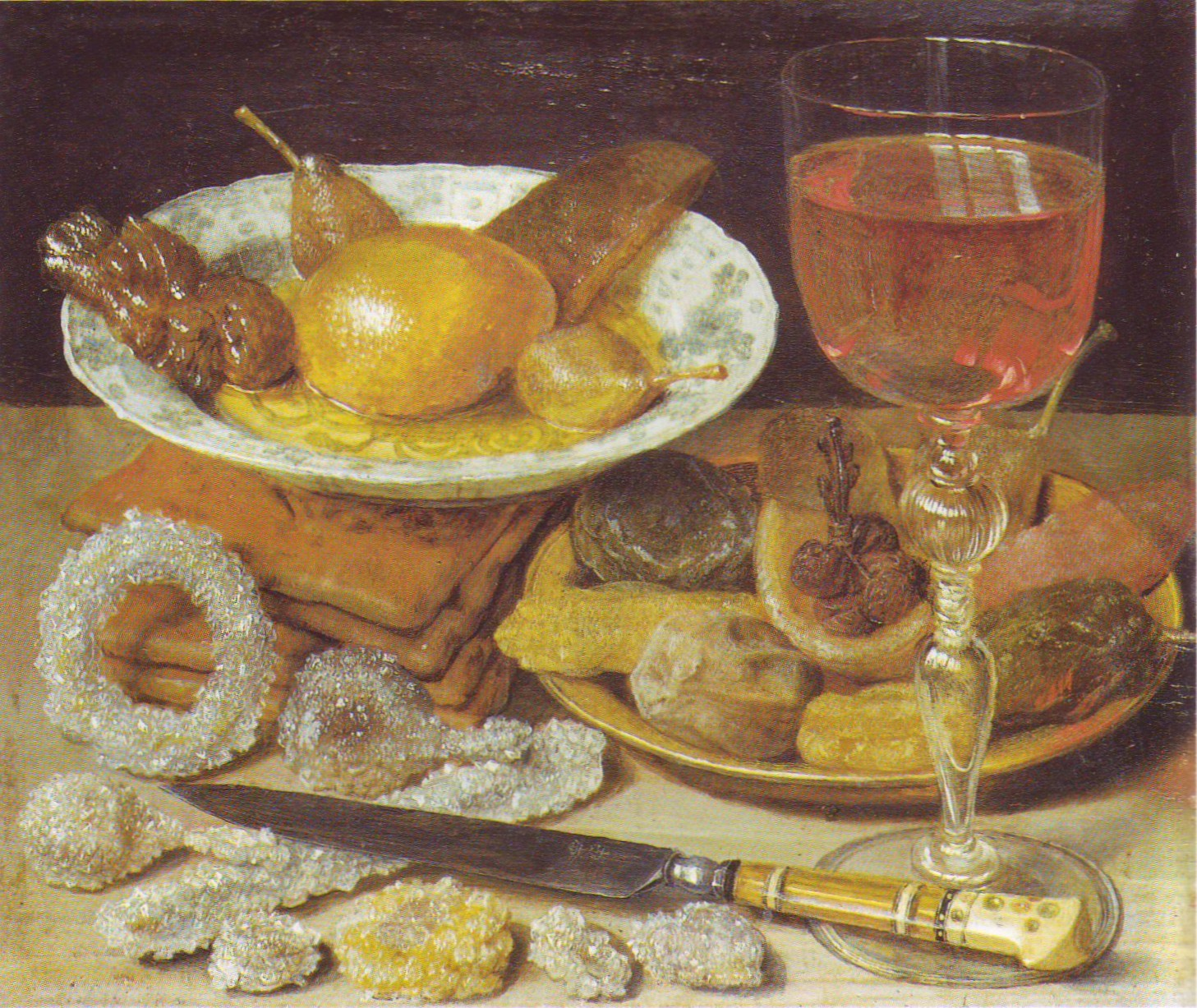
Still life with sweets, by Georg Flegel.

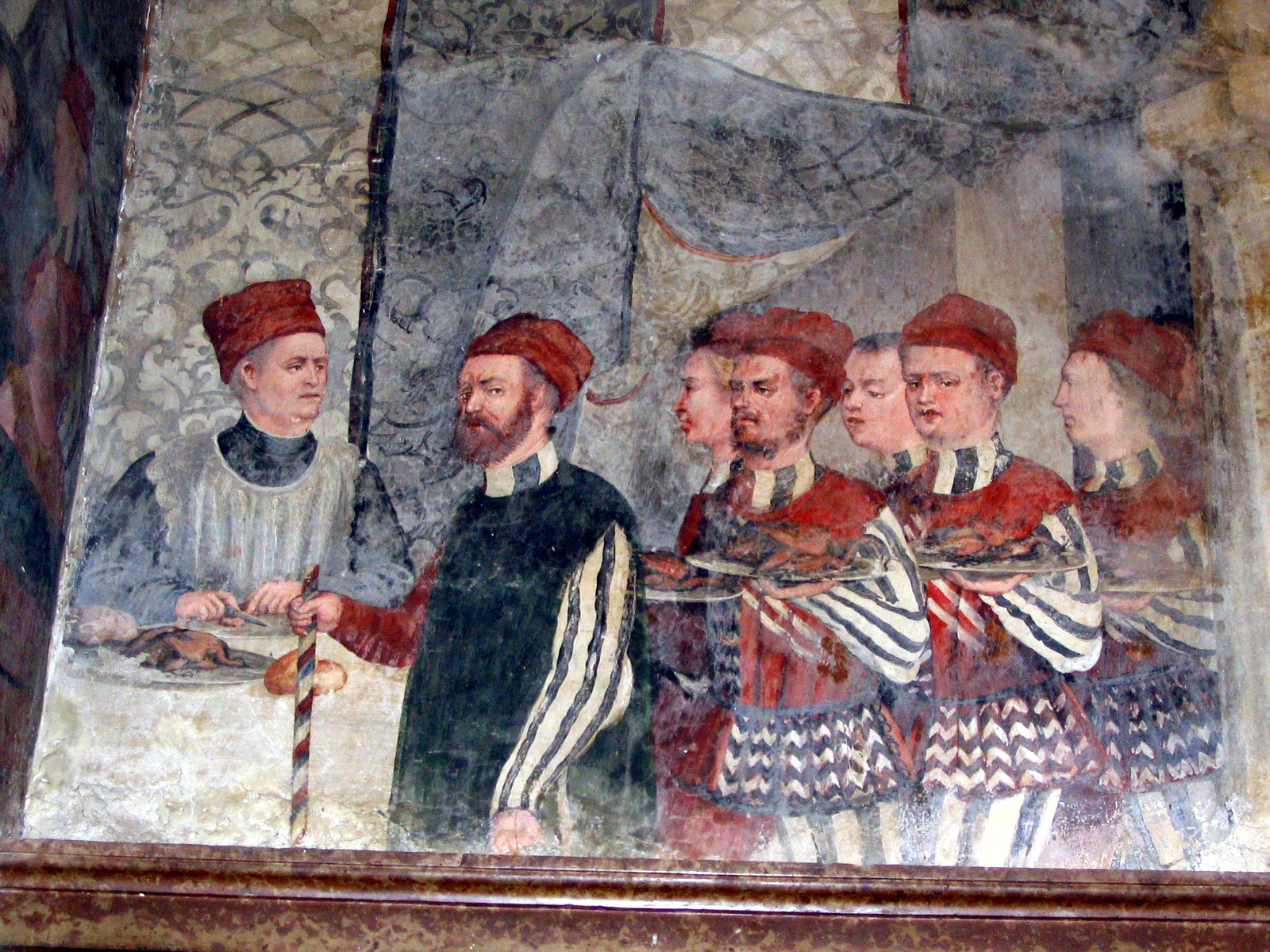
Banquet scene, 1467, Malpaga Castle.

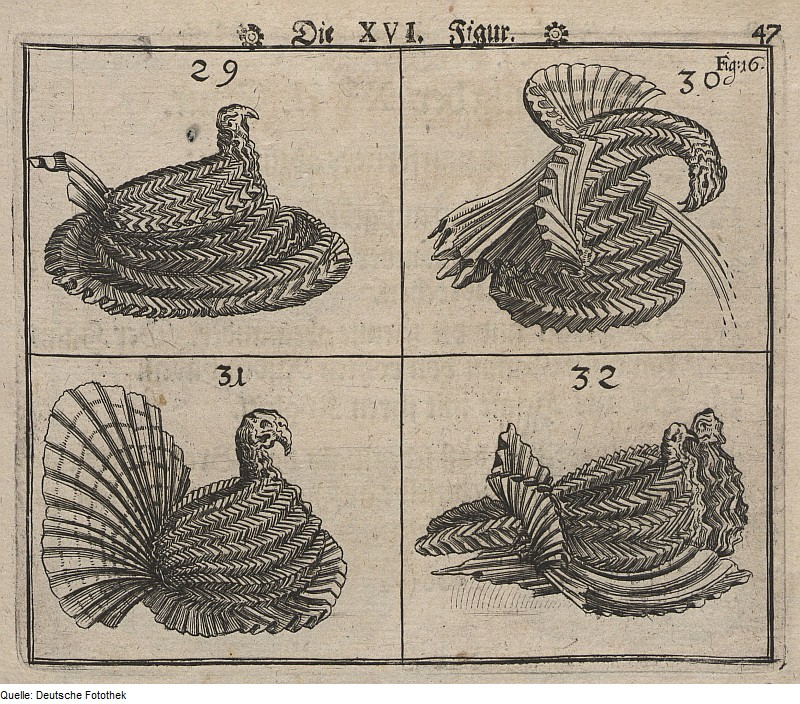
Novelty napkin folds, Paul Fürst editions, 1657.

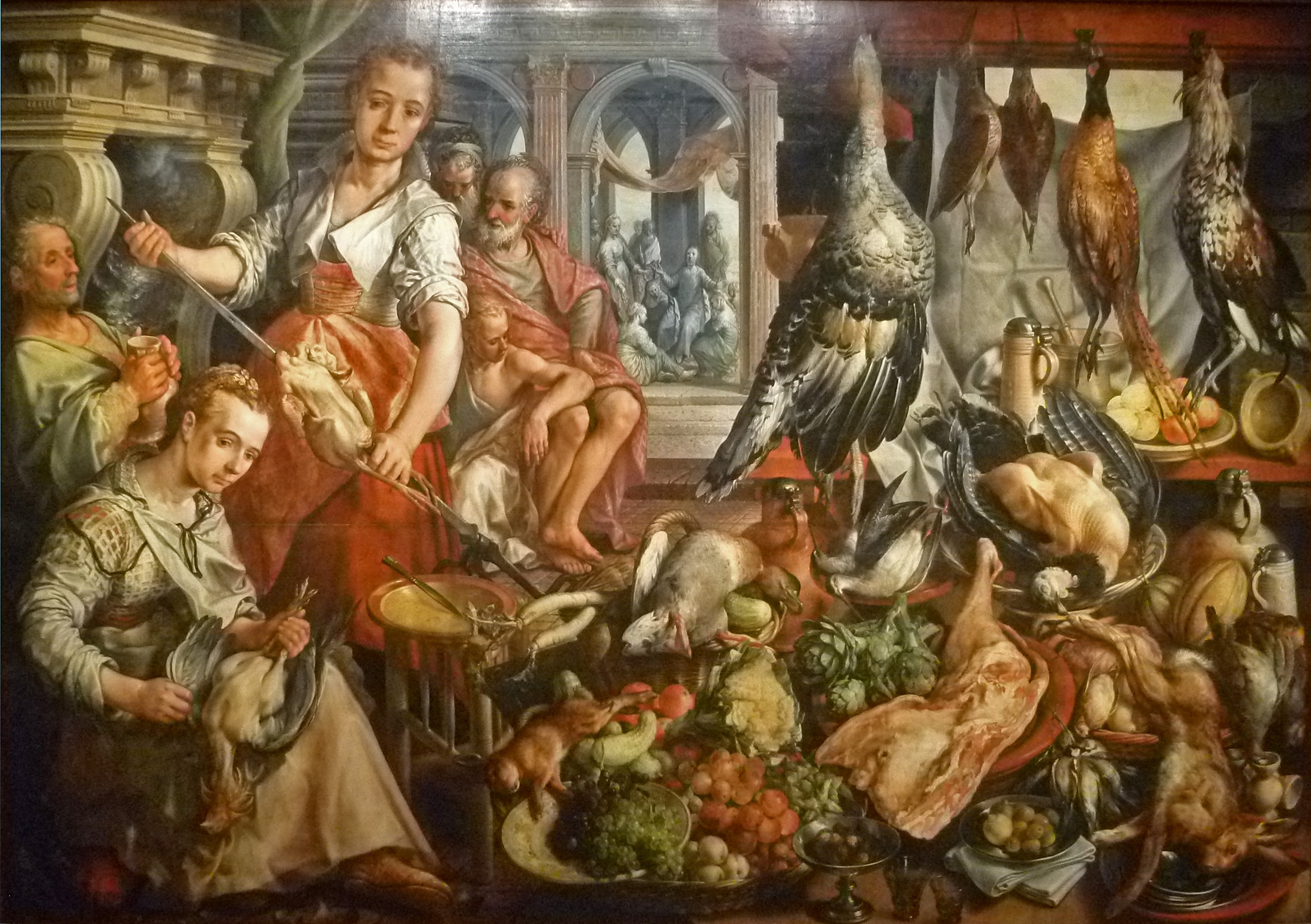
The well-furnished kitchen (1566) by Joachim Beuckelaer.

== See also ==
- Tafelmusik
- Renaissance
- Early modern European cuisine

== Bibliography ==
- Albala, Ken (2007). The banquet: Dining in the Great Courts of late Renaissance Europe. Urbana-Chicago: University of Illinois Press. ISBN 978-0-252-03133-5.
- Bentini, Jadranka; et al. (et al.) (1989). A tavola con il Principe [At the table with the Prince] (in Italian). Ferrara: Corbo Editore. ISBN 88-85668-26-7.
- di Messisbugo, Cristoforo (1549). Banchetti, Compositori di vivande et apparechio generale [Banquets, food composers and general equipment] (in Italian). Vicenza: edizione F. Bandini.
- Cruciani, Fabrizio; Falletti, Clelia; Ruffini, Franco (1994). "La sperimentazione a Ferrara negli anni di Ercole I e di Ludovico Ariosto" [Experimentation in Ferrara during the years of Ercole I and Ludovico Ariosto]. Teatro e Storia (in Italian) (16).
- Cogotti, Marina; di Schino, June; et al. (org.) (2012). Magnificenze a tavola - Le arti del banchetto rinascimentale [Magnificence at the table - The arts of Renaissance banqueting] (in Italian). Rome: De Luca Editori d'Arte. ISBN 978-88-6557-083-8.
- Durante, Castore (1877). Il tesoro della sanità [The treasure of health] (in Italian). Milan: Panzeri.
- Battista Rossetti, Giovanni (1584). Dello scalco [Of the stepladder] (in Italian). Ferrara.
