= Bacchus and Ariadne =

Painting by Titian

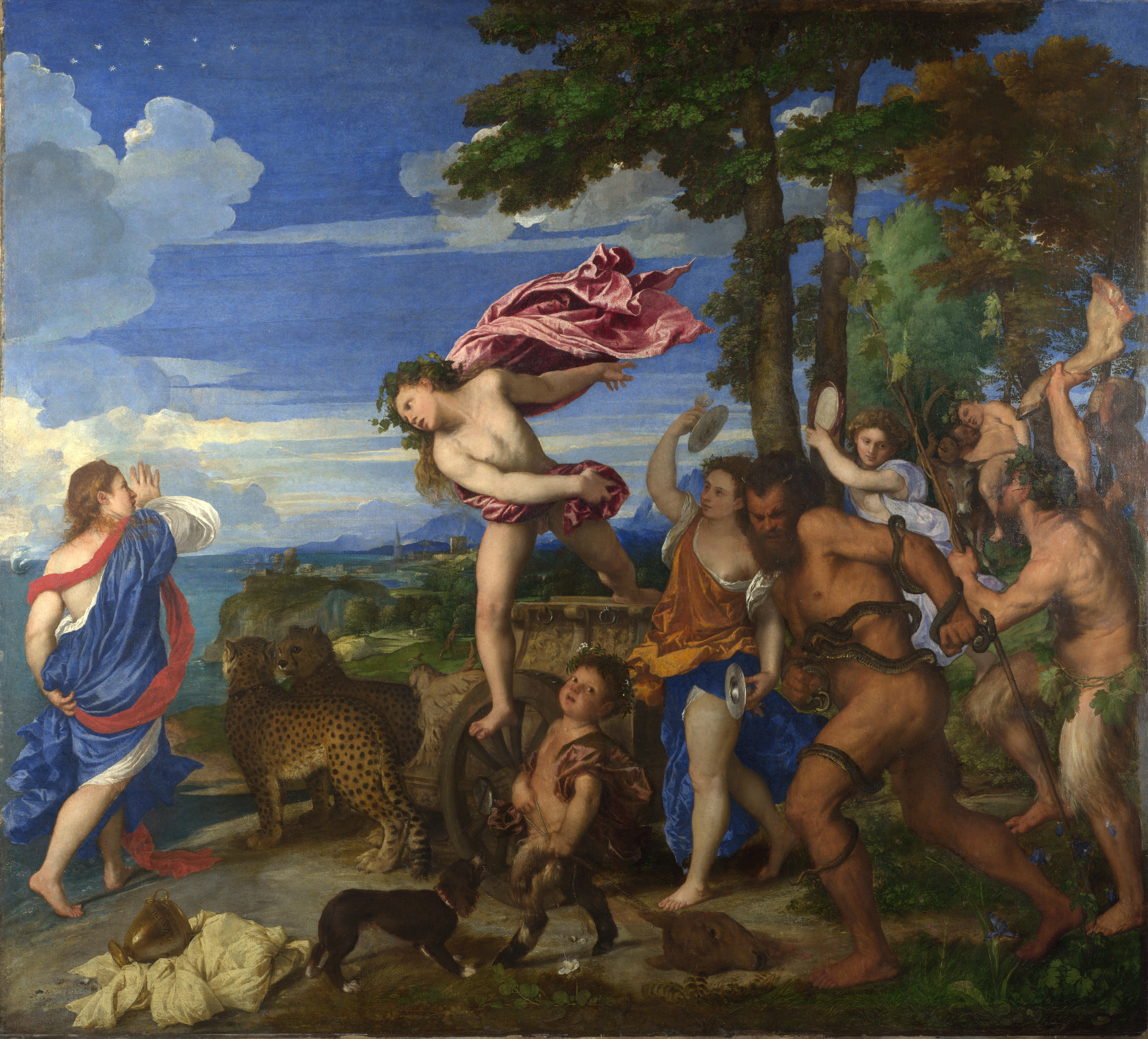
- Artist: Titian
- Year: 1520–1523
- Type: Oil on canvas (applied onto conservation board 1968)
- Dimensions: 176.5 cm × 191 cm (69.5 in × 75 in)
- Location: National Gallery, London

Bacchus and Ariadne (1520–1523) is an oil painting by Titian. It is one of a cycle of paintings on mythological subjects produced for Alfonso I d'Este, Duke of Ferrara, for the Camerino d'Alabastro – a private room in his palazzo in Ferrara decorated with paintings based on classical texts. An advance payment was given to Raphael, who originally held the commission for the subject of a Triumph of Bacchus.

At the time of Raphael's death in 1520, only a preliminary drawing was completed. The commission was then handed to Titian. In the case of Bacchus and Ariadne, the subject matter was derived from the Roman poets Catullus and Ovid, and perhaps other classical authors.

The painting, considered one of Titian's greatest works, is now in the National Gallery, London. The other major paintings in the cycle are The Feast of the Gods, mostly by Giovanni Bellini, now in the National Gallery of Art, Washington, D.C, and Titian's The Bacchanal of the Andrians and The Worship of Venus, both now in the Museo del Prado, Madrid. The series was a very early treatment of subjects from classical mythology on a heroic scale in painting, rather than in small decorative pieces, and very influential on later works.

== Description ==
Ariadne has been left on the island of Naxos, deserted by her lover Theseus, whose ship sails away to the far left. She is discovered on the shore by the god Bacchus, leading a procession of revellers in a chariot drawn by two cheetahs. These were probably modelled on those in the Duke's menagerie and were tigers in Ovid's original text. Another option is that Titian was asked by his patron Alfonso I d'Este to create cheetahs inspired by Imagines of Philostratus. Bacchus is depicted in mid-air as he leaps out of the chariot, taking her with him. In the sky above the figure of Ariadne is the star constellation Corona Borealis, the Northern Crown.

The National Gallery's website describes the scene: "Bacchus, god of wine, emerges with his followers from the landscape to the right. Falling in love with Ariadne on first sight, he leaps from his chariot, drawn by two cheetahs, towards her. Ariadne had been abandoned on the Greek island of Naxos by Theseus, whose ship is shown in the distance. The picture shows her initial fear of Bacchus, but he raised her to heaven and turned her into a constellation, represented by the stars above her head."

The composition is divided diagonally into two triangles, one of blue sky, using the expensive ultramarine pigment, and still but for the two lovers caught in movement, the other a riot of movement and predominantly green/brown in colour. The follower of Bacchus who struggles with a snake is sometimes associated with the antique sculpture of Laocoön and His Sons who had been killed by snakes. This statue had recently been discovered in Rome, and Titian had a history of sketching this figure, as seen through a woodcut completed from Titian's sketch of Laocoön and his sons. But the satyr in Titian's painting is not in a mortal combat with the snakes, he is merely girding himself with them as is described in the original text by Catullus. The King Charles Spaniel that barks at the boy satyr is a common motif in Titian's work and was probably a court pet. The gold urn inscribed with the artist's signature (TICIANVS) may also have been familiar to the Duke as one of the antiquities in his collection.

Fern Luskin argues in "Titian's Bacchus and his two loves," Titian represents not only Bacchus' passion for Ariadne, but also his infatuation with a boy satyr, Ampelos, who struts at the center of the composition. Bacchus' love for Ampelos is told by the ancient Greek poet Nonnos in his Dionysiaca (Books 11 to 12). Ampelos (meaning grapevine in Greek) merits such a prominent position in the painting because it was only through the boy's death and metamorphosis into a grapevine that Bacchus was able to produce wine for the first time, thus giving life to Bacchus' persona as the god of wine, the essence of his divinity. According to Nonnos (Dionysiaca, 11. 1138-790), when Ampelos died, the grief-stricken Bacchus garlanded the boy with 'perishable anemone' flowers. This explains why Titian initially painted anemone flowers in Ampelos' hair, now barely visible because he later replaced them with jasmine flowers. Although anemone would have unmistakably identified the boy satyr as Ampelos, it "would have been anachronistic because, according to Nonnos (Dionysiaca, 11. 236–237), Bacchus crowned Ampelos with 'perishable anemone' after his death, whereas in Titian's painting the boy is shown alive."

The analysis of pigments used by Titian in this painting has been undertaken by scientists at the National Gallery in London and this analysis is illustrated at ColourLex.

== Literary sources ==
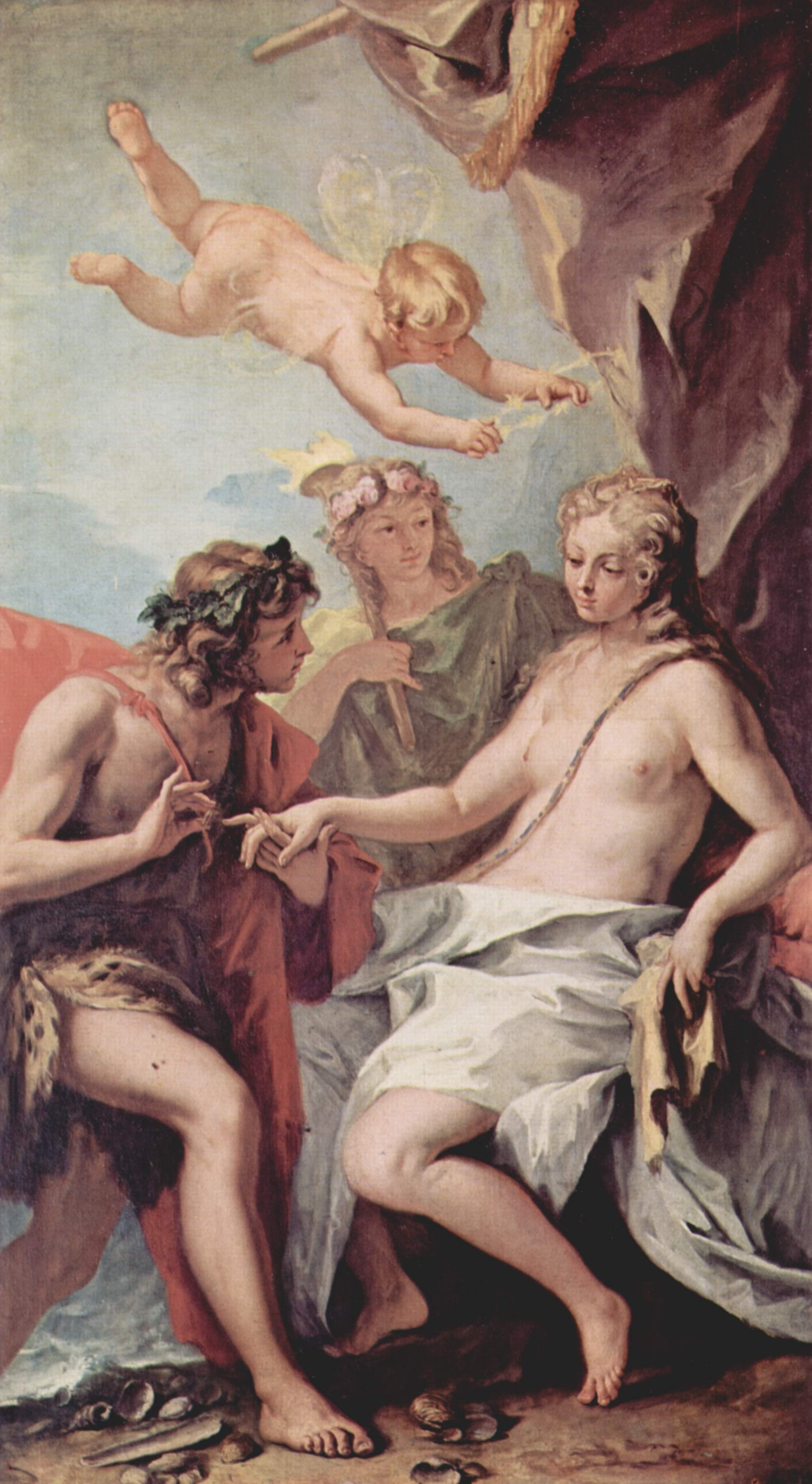
Ariadne being discovered by Dionysus (Bacchus)

There is continued discussion about which work or works of ancient literature Titian's painting is based on. Titian himself did not read Latin, still less Greek, but he had a number of friends who could help him with details from classical works not yet translated into Italian. Until the 1940s, Catullus' 64th poem was considered to be the inspiration, due to the fact that it includes multiple images from Catullus' poem, such as the tambourine, cymbals, and the Satyr wrapped in serpents.

In 1948, art historian Edgar Wind suggested instead that this image was based on Ovid's Fasti Book 3. Wind contended that this was the true literary source because it accounted for Bacchus leaping from the chariot, the presence of the constellation in the sky, and the fact that Ariadne is awake in this image (many depictions show Bacchus seeing Ariadne for the first time while she is asleep).

Other scholars have suggested that the Northern Crown points to other works by Ovid, either his Metamorphoses, in which Bacchus throws the crown of Ariadne into the sky where it becomes the constellation Northern Crown, or his Ars Amatoria, in which Bacchus promises the entire sky to Ariadne where she then would become the Northern Crown.

At the extreme right of the Bacchus and Ariadne is a shaggy Silenus holding a vine-clad staff. According to Luskin, he is the vision Bacchus sees of Eros after Ampelos' death who, as recounted by Nonnos (Dionysiaca, XI. 351–354), appears to the wine god 'in the horned shape of a shaggy Seilenos...' holding a fennel staff. His staff, however, is not a thyrsus made from a fennel stalk. It is a reed-pole. But, it is no ordinary reed-pole. This reed-pole was formerly Calamos (meaning reed), another of Bacchus' young companions who metamorphosed into a reed after committing suicide in the Dionysiaca, 11. 369–481. The grapevine entwining the Silenus' reed-pole is Ampelos undergoing his transformation into a grapevine before our very eyes, an event described by Nonnos in Book 12. 173–184. This miraculously formed grapevine has not yet produced any grapes, only leaves and tendrils, because the Italian name for Ampelos, Pampino, means immature grapevine and Titian is showing the very beginning of his metamorphosis into a grapevine. The bullock's leg the shaggy Silenus grasps in his other hand is based on Catullus' line about the Sileni in Bacchus' retinue who "hurled the limbs of a young bullock torn in pieces." Thus, this Silenus plays a dual role, that is, in his left hand, as Nonnos' shaggy Silenus/Eros who supports himself on his staff, and in his right hand, as one of Catullus' Sileni who celebrate the Bacchic mystery rites by flinging a bullock's leg.

Luskin summarizes: "In his Bacchus and Ariadne, Titian seamlessly conflated the texts, or translations, of four ancient authors, adding a few motifs of his own invention, and included Bacchus' two love interests, one homosexual, the other, heterosexual, thereby creating a pictorial version of these stories that was completely unprecedented. Telescoping time, the painter represented the god's current love, Ariadne, both in the alluring present and in the future, immortalized as a constellation [the Corona Borealis], and his former love, Ampelos, both as boy-satyr, and as the grapevine into which he was transformed. He placed the wine god at the fulcrum of the composition, with Ariadne on the left and his past love, Ampelos, front and centre to emphasize that the god's role as divine vintager was made possible by this young satyr."

Titian's depiction of the shaggy Silenus and of Ampelos both as a boy satyr and in the process of metamorphosing into a grapevine that wreathes the Silenus' reed-pole may suggest that Nonnos' Dionysiaca was also a source for the Bacchus and Ariadne.

== Restoration ==
The canvas on which Bacchus and Ariadne is painted was rolled up twice in the first century of its existence, which had consequences for the painting. From the turn of the 19th century onwards it was frequently being restored to stop paint from flaking off, with the most controversial restoration being that carried out at the National Gallery between 1967 and 1968. This greatly brightened the surface of the painting, and came as something of a shock to many viewers, used to a heavy varnish finish. When discoloured varnish lying directly on top of the paint surface was removed, some of the paint itself came off as well and repainting was necessary.

This has caused some critics to note that the expanse of blue sky on the left-hand side, one of the worst-affected areas of the painting, appears flat and pallid. It has also been argued that the removal of the varnish has left the painting tonally out of balance, since Titian is likely to have added some subtle glazes to the paint surface in order to tone down some of the more jarring colours. The National Gallery maintains that this was an unavoidable loss, because the accrued layers of later varnish had turned the painting brown and sludgy and had to be removed. More recent examination has confirmed that the paint remains largely original.

== Other paintings ==
There are many other paintings of the subject in museum collections, including the following:

- Giovan Battista Pittoni (1720–1725), in the Louvre
- Guido Reni (Los Angeles)
- Ferdinand Bol, Hermitage Museum
- Eustache Le Sueur, Boston MFA
- Sebastiano Ricci, Chiswick House
- Jacopo Tintoretto, Bacchus, Venus and Ariadne, Doge's Palace, Venice.

A copy of Titian's painting by Nicolas Poussin is part of the collection at Alnwick Castle.

== References in other media ==
John Keats alluded to this painting (which was brought to England in 1806) in his "Ode to a Nightingale" ("Away! away! for I will fly to thee, Not charioted by Bacchus and his pards") and in "Lamia" ("Upon her crest she wore a wannish fire/Sprinkled with stars, like Ariadne's tiar").

Letitia Elizabeth Landon reviews this work in her poem "Bacchus and Ariadne", first published in 1822, as a "Dramatic Scene", being a dialogue between Leonardi and Alvine.

The painting was the basis for the cover of the 1993 album God Shuffled His Feet by rock band Crash Test Dummies.

The Indonesian composer Ananda Sukarlan has made a musical work for flute and piano, "Rescuing Ariadne" after being inspired by Titian's painting in the National Gallery of London.

In her novel Misalliance, Anita Brookner alludes to Titian's painting and depicts the encounter between Ariadne and Bacchus as an "ecstatic moment of recognition [...], so immediate that Bacchus' foot has not had time to touch the ground as he leaps from his chariot, so shocking that Ariadne flings up a hand protest."

== See also ==
- List of works by Titian
