= Camerini d'alabastro =

Rooms built over the Via Coperta in Italy

Coordinates: 44°50′13.02″N 11°37′8.84″E

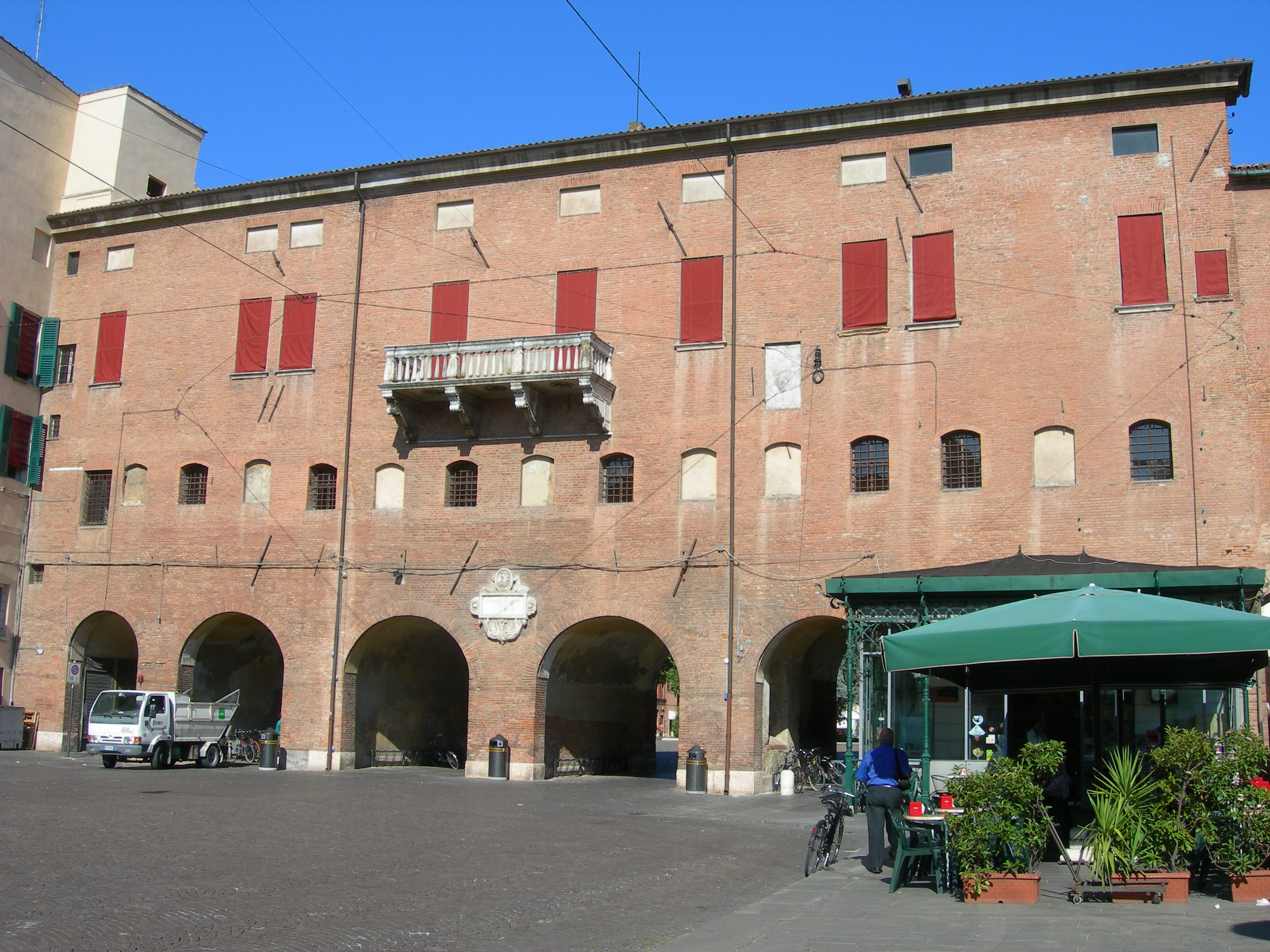
Via Coperta

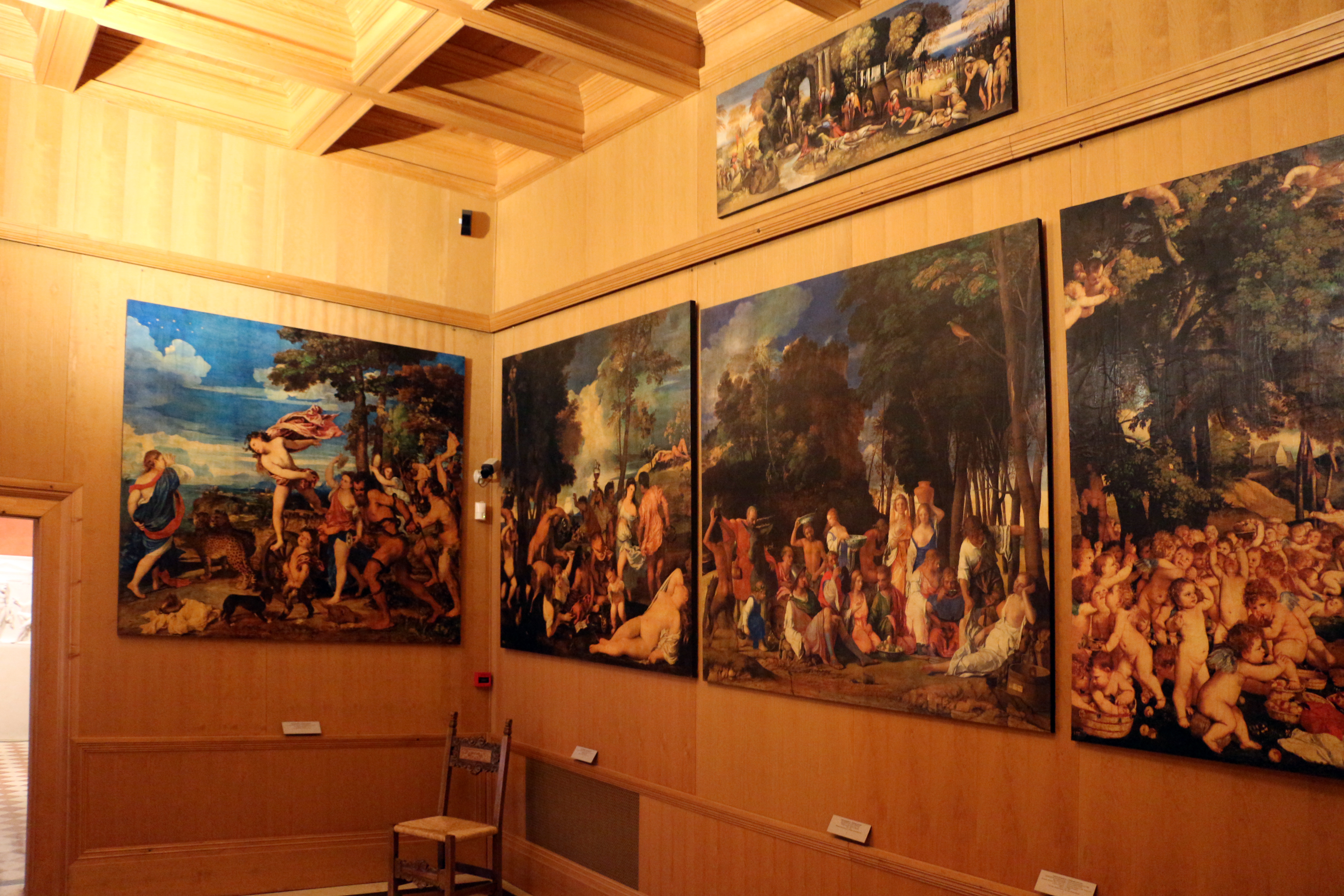
Modern reconstruction, with reproductions

The Camerini d'alabastro (little rooms of alabaster) are a range of rooms built over the Via Coperta in Ferrara, northern Italy, linking the Castello Estense to the Palazzo Ducale. They may have included the studiolo or little study of Alfonso I d'Este, Duke of Ferrara.
