= Thomas Agnew & Sons =

British fine art dealer, 1851–2013

Coordinates: 51.5083°N 0.1407°W

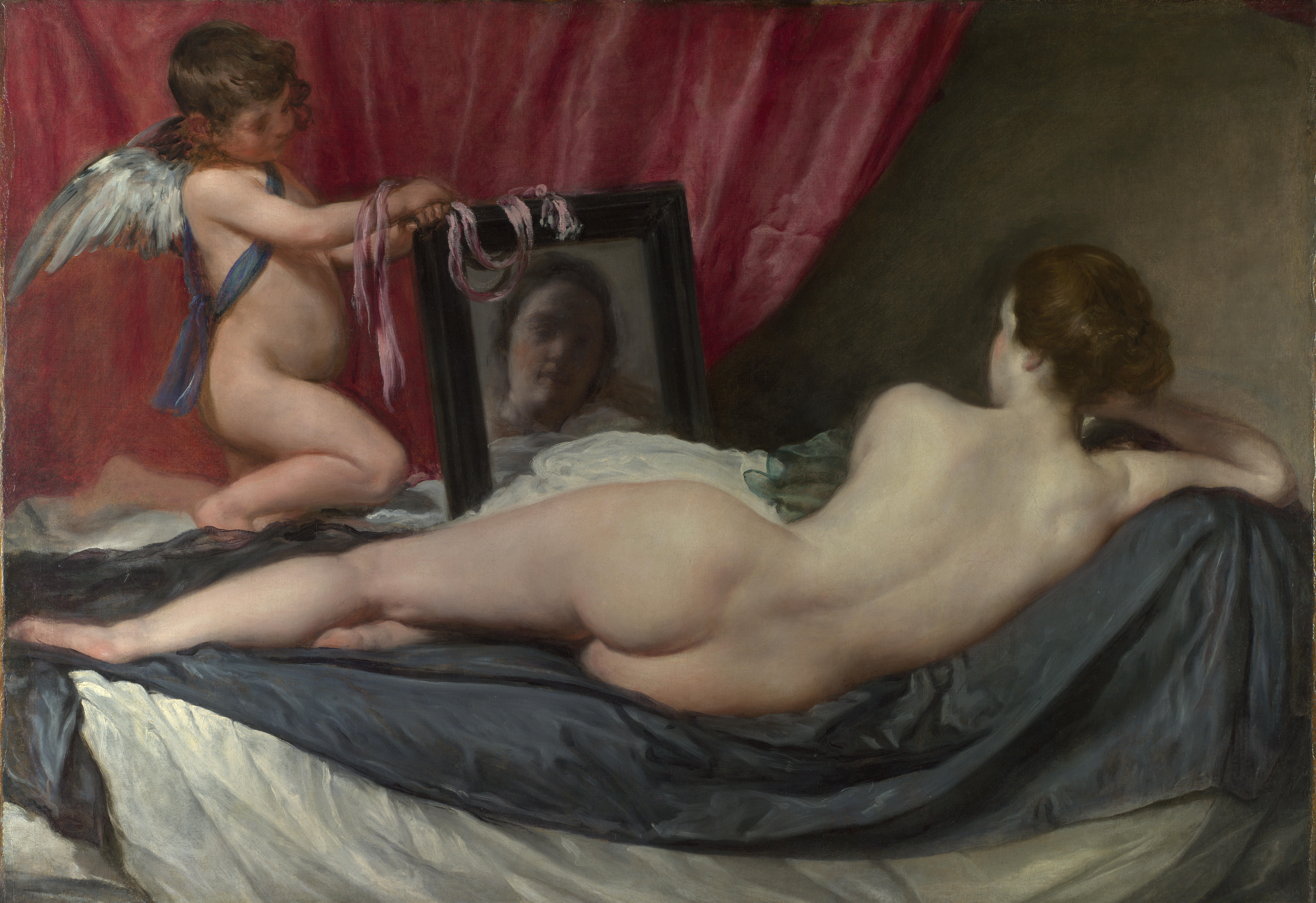
Diego Velázquez, Rokeby Venus, purchased from Agnew's in 1906 by The National Art-Collections Fund,now in the National Gallery, London

Thomas Agnew & Sons is a fine arts dealer in London that began as a print and publishing partnership between Thomas Agnew and Vittore Zanetti in Manchester in 1817. Agnew ended the partnership by taking full control of the company in 1835.

The firm opened its London gallery in 1860, where it established itself as a leading art dealership in Mayfair. Agnew's held a pre-eminent position in the world of Old Master paintings. It also played a major role in the growth of a market for contemporary British art in the late 19th century.

The firm was owned by several members of the family, until the London gallery closed in 2013. The retiring chairman was from the sixth generation of Agnews in the business. Agnew's was then sold privately and the re-opened London gallery is now run by Lord Anthony Crichton-Stuart, a former head of Christie's Old Master paintings department, New York.

== History ==
Portrait of William Agnew by Frank Holl, 1883

Agnew's, as it is commonly called, has long held a prominent position in the Bond Street trade in Old Master pictures. The founder's sons, Sir William Agnew, 1st Baronet (1825–1910) and Thomas Agnew (1827–1883), were pivotal in the firm's rise in London, where Agnew's first established itself in 1860. Broadly speaking, Sir William's line produced the in-house connoisseurs (most notably C. Morland Agnew [1855–1931]), while Thomas's son, W. Lockett Agnew (1858–1918), inherited his father's commercial flair.

It was William Agnew who shifted the gallery trade to Old Masters. As The Times noted in Sir William's obituary,

[...] in 1877 the firm had built rooms in 39 Old Bond Street (later called 43 Old Bond Street), and when the succession of Old Master exhibitions, the example of Sir Richard Wallace and the Rothschilds, and the revived passion for eighteenth-century architecture and furniture had turned the taste of the new rich men back to the older art, William Agnew was ready to find the pictures.

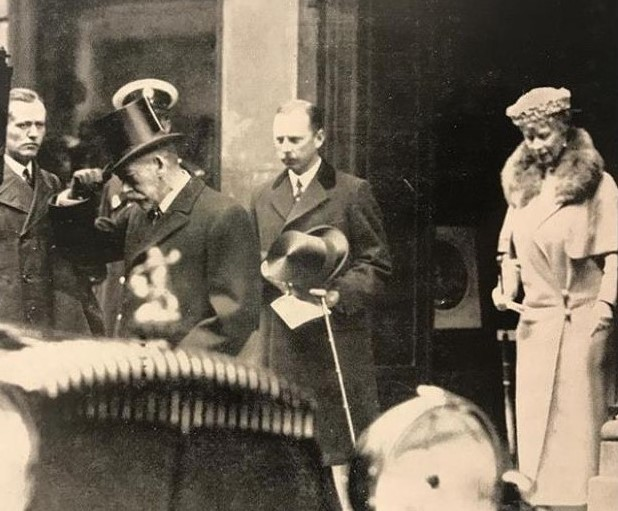
King George V and Queen Mary leaving Agnew's after a private view in 1935.

Agnew's acted as principal agent and advisor to Edward Cecil Guinness, 1st Earl of Iveagh (1847–1927). The firm also held a significant part in the collecting activities of Alfred Beit (1853–1906), John G. Johnson (1841–1917), Alfred de Rothschild (1842–1918), Ferdinand de Rothschild (1839–1898), Henry Clay Frick, and George Salting (1835–1909). King George V (1865–1936) visited Agnew's Bond Street galleries on numerous occasions. Additionally, Agnew's often served as agent for the National Gallery in the salerooms. More recently, important clients include Paul Mellon (1907–1999), Norton Simon (1907–1993), and the Samuel Henry Kress Foundation. In the late 19th and early 20th century, the firm was well regarded not only by the era's leading collectors, but also by fellow dealers. Consequently, in Bond Street, Agnew's enjoyed friendly relations with Knoedler, Arthur Joseph Sulley (1853–1930), the Wertheimer brothers, and in Paris, Charles Sedelmeyer (1837–1925).

During the remainder of the 20th century and up to today, Agnew's has placed many masterpieces in major museums in Europe, America, and in emerging global markets. The contributions to the collections of the Metropolitan Museum of Art, the National Gallery of Art, Washington DC, and the National Gallery, London, are noteworthy. The firm has handled major pictures by, amongst others, Caravaggio, John Constable, van Dyck, El Greco, Guercino, Frans Hals, Poussin, Rembrandt, Rubens, Vermeer, Titian, Pontormo, J. M. W. Turner, Joseph Wright of Derby, and Velázquez, including the latter's Rokeby Venus in the National Gallery, London.

Agnew's also exhibited and sold works of Impressionist and Modern artists such as Paul Cézanne, Camille Pissarro, Paul Gauguin, Claude Monet, Pierre-Auguste Renoir, Edgar Degas, and Pablo Picasso. In recent years, the gallery has increasingly promoted the establishment of lesser-known artists of the early twentieth century, namely the German-Swedish painter and portraitist Lotte Laserstein.

In 2008, the purpose-built gallery in Old Bond Street (1877), designed by Salomons & Wornum, was sold by Agnew's to Etro, the Italian fashion house. In 2013, after nearly two centuries of family ownership, the firm was purchased privately and the new gallery relocated its premises from Albemarle Street to 6 St James's Place, London, under the directorship of art historian Lord Anthony Crichton-Stuart. The Agnew family will continue as consulting participants in the firm's operation. The archive was given to the National Gallery. The new gallery presents a broad range of genres and subjects, price ranges, and periods in several different mediums, including paintings, watercolours and drawings as well as sculpture. Particular attention in recent years has been paid to highlighting the work of lesser-known female artists in Western art history, such as Lotte Laserstein, whose work was the focus of an Agnew's show in 2017. In 2021, the gallery ran an exhibition dedicated to Albrecht Dürer which included a newly found drawing by the artist: this previously unknown work has been subject to significant publicity.

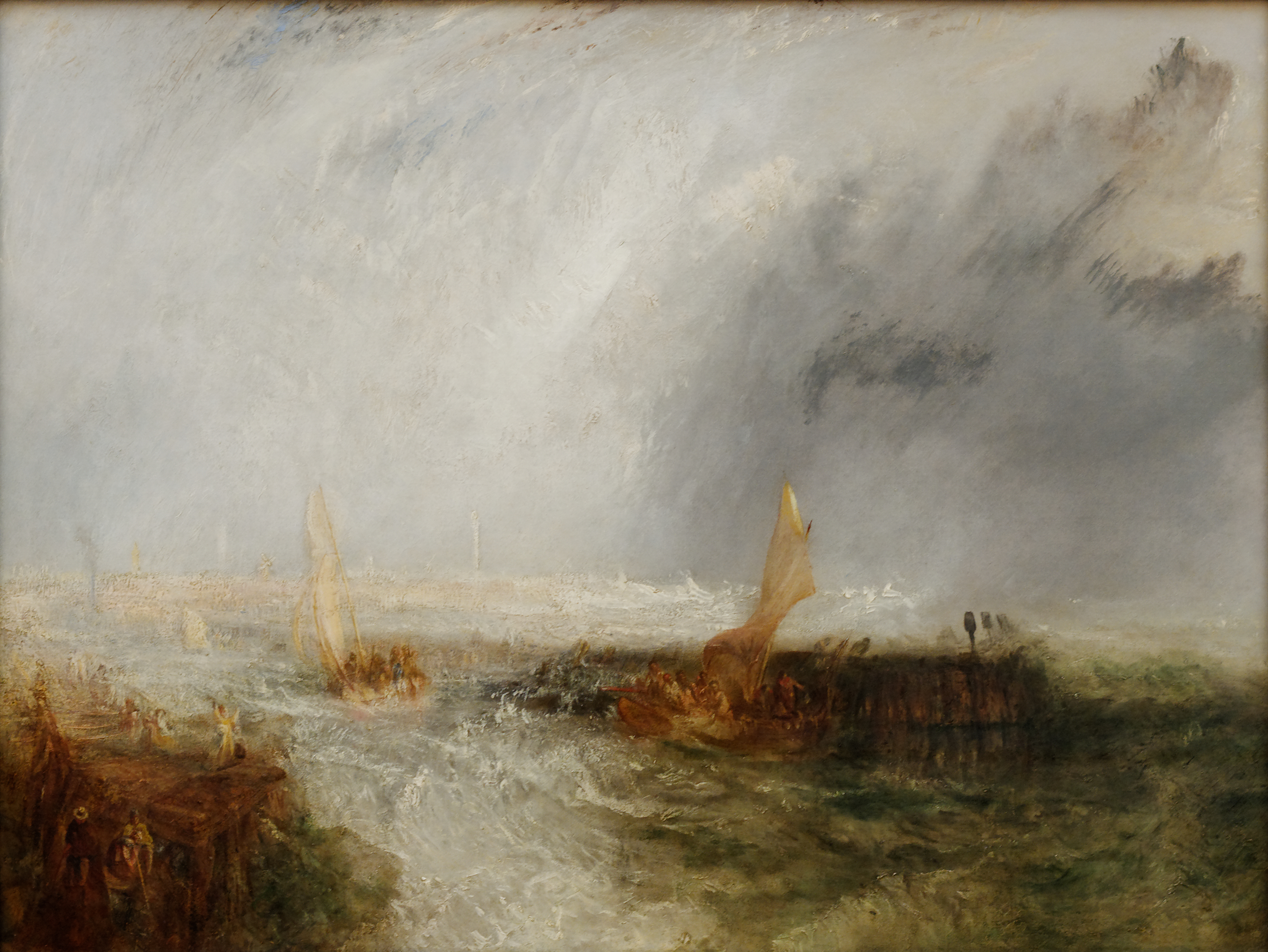
Joseph Mallord William Turner, Ostend, purchased from Agnew's in 1975 by the Neue Pinakothek, Munich.

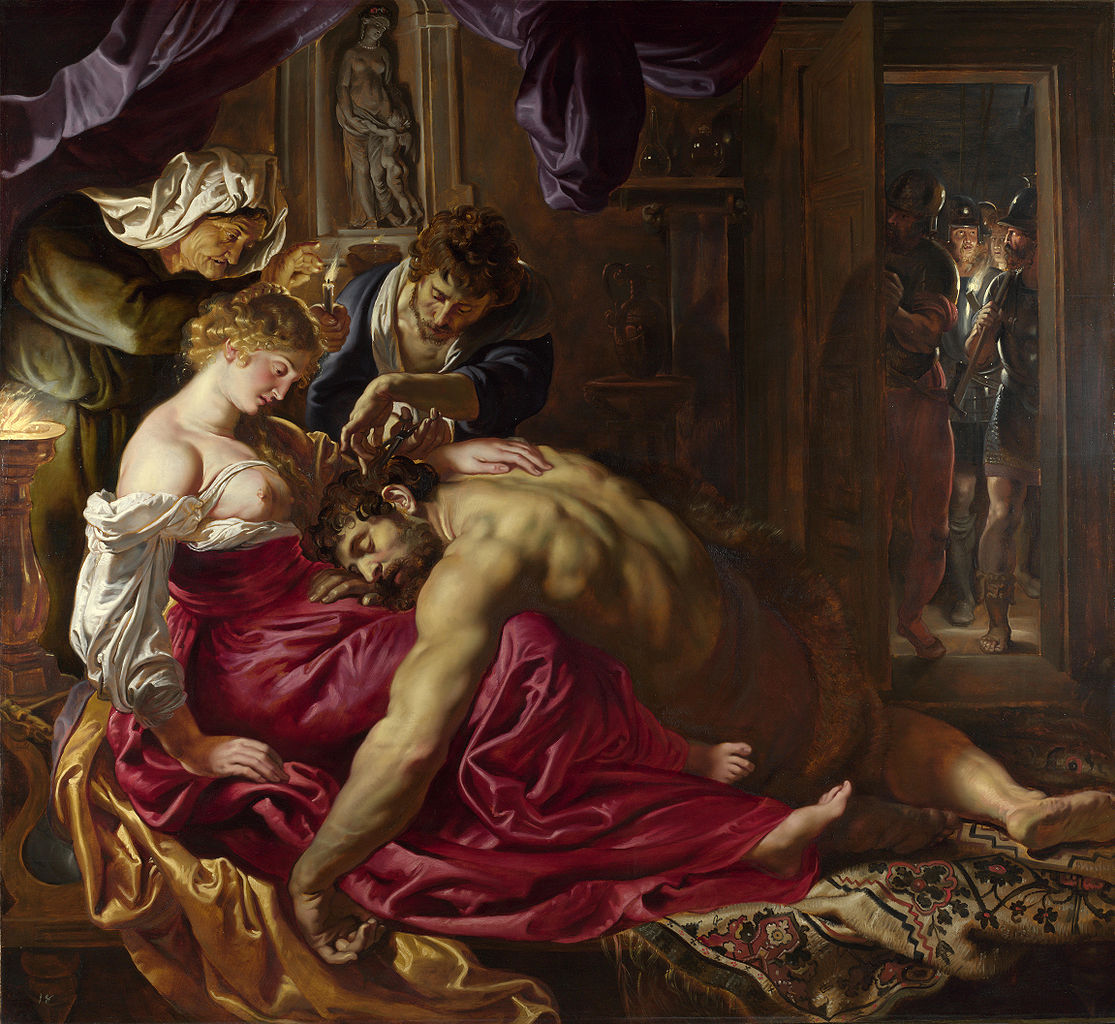
Sir Peter Paul Rubens, Samson and Delilah, purchased by Agnew's on behalf of the Trustees of the National Gallery in 1980, National Gallery, London.

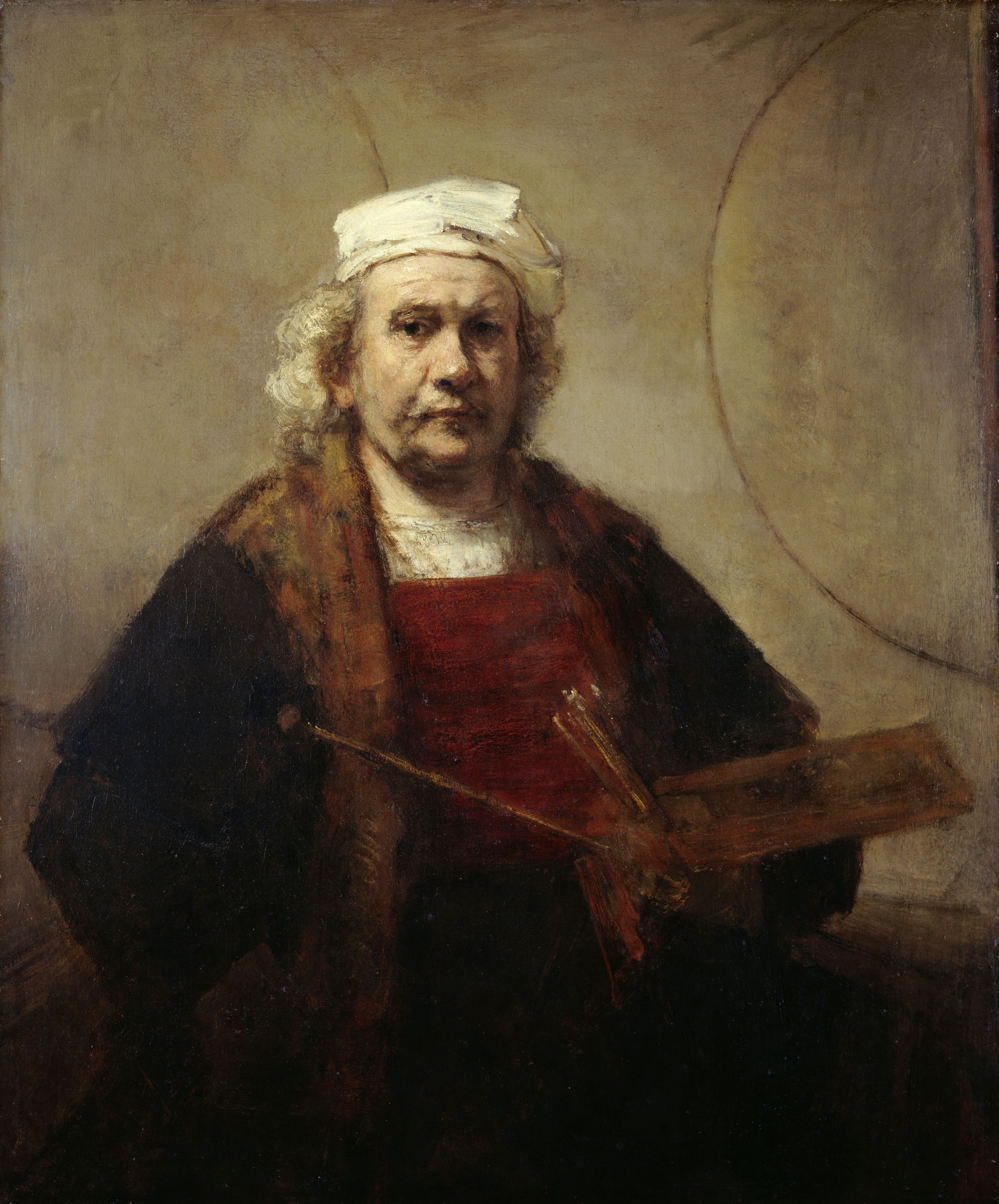
Rembrandt van Rijn, Self-Portrait with Two Circles, purchased from Agnew's in 1888 by Sir E. C. Guinness, present owner: Iveagh Bequest, Kenwood House.

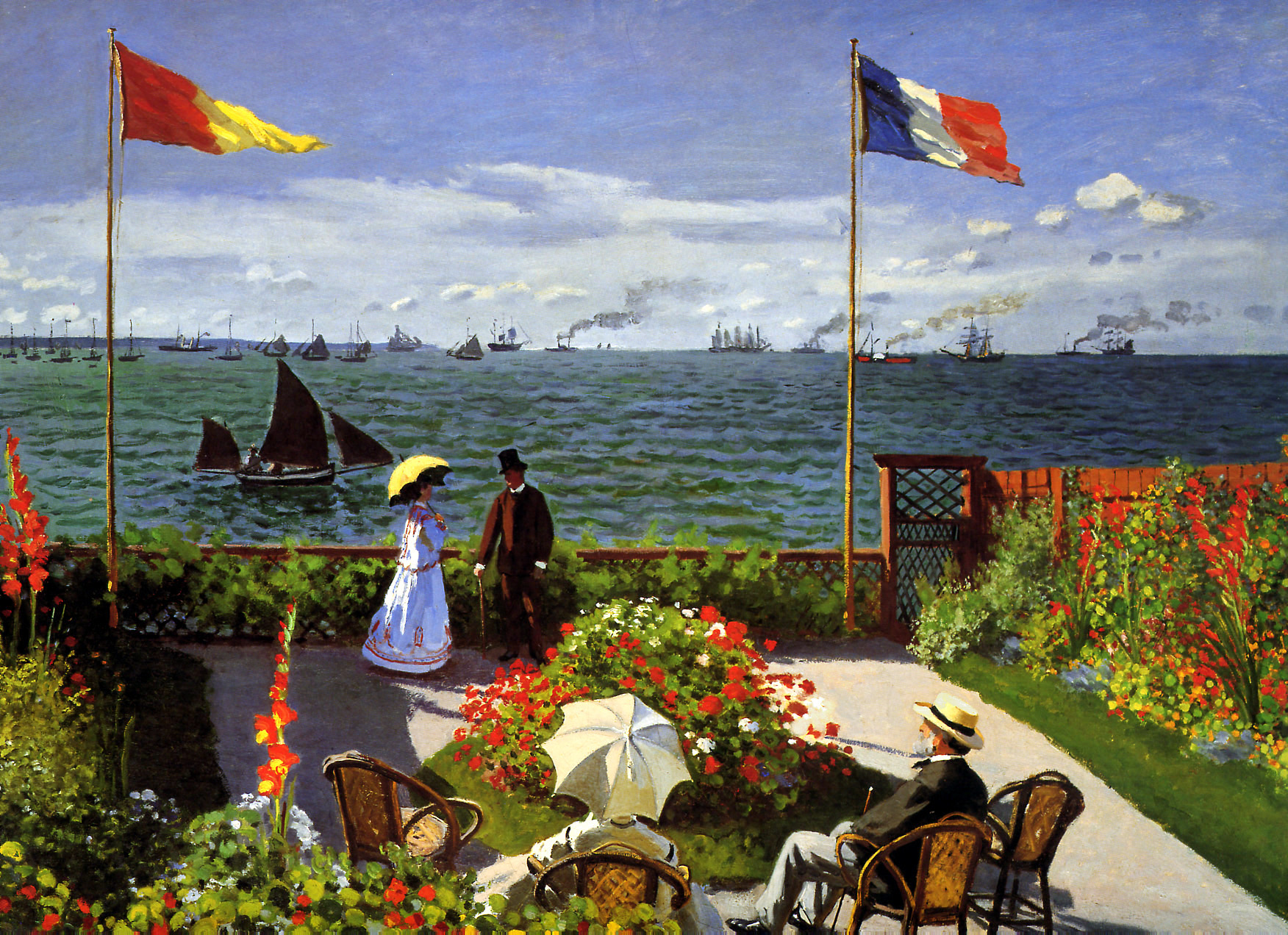
Claude Monet, Terrace at Sainte-Adresse, purchased from Agnew's by the Metropolitan Museum of Art, New York, 1967.

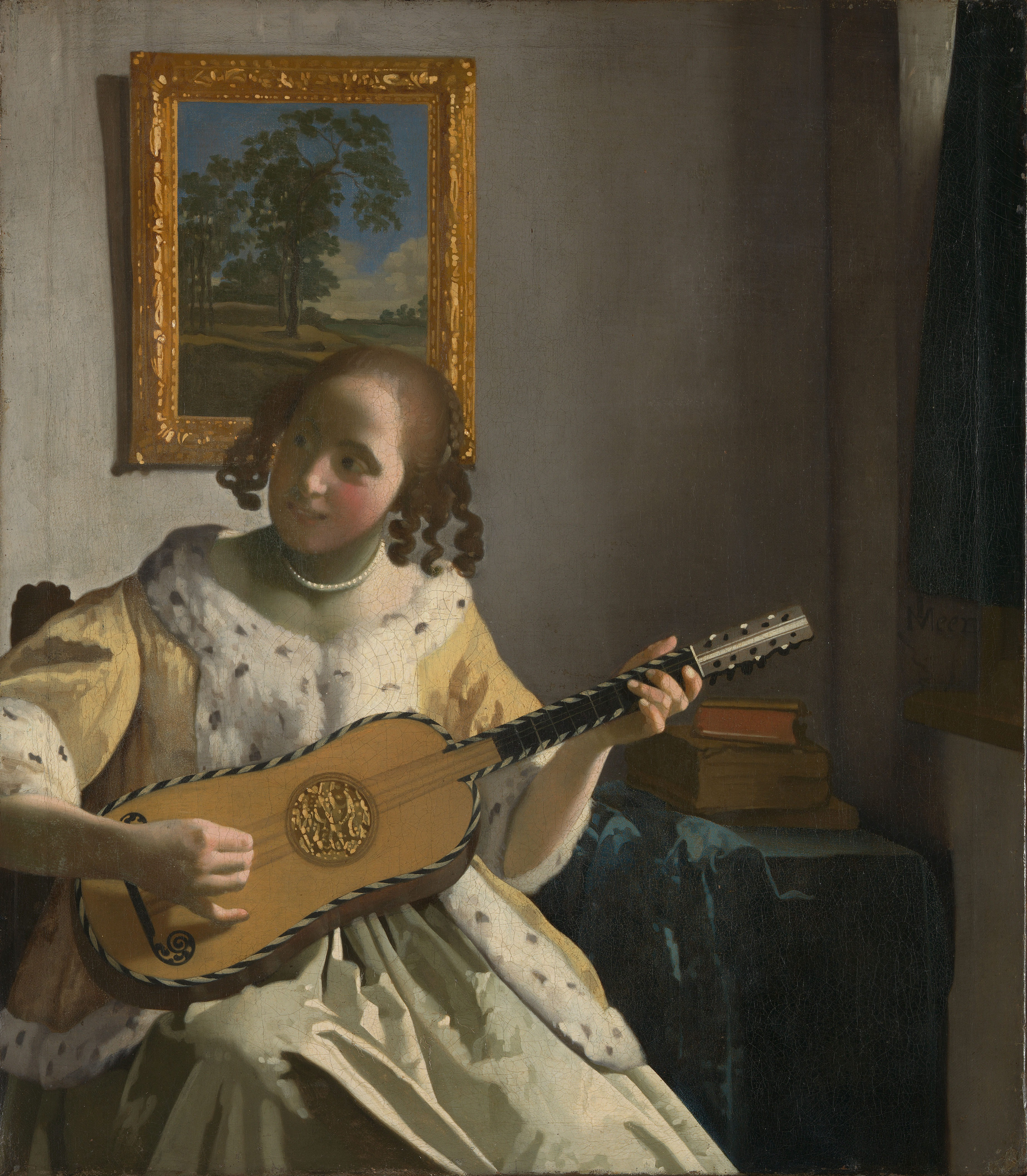
Johannes Vermeer, The Guitar Player, purchased from Agnew's in 1889 by Sir E. C. Guinness, present owner: Iveagh Bequest, Kenwood House.

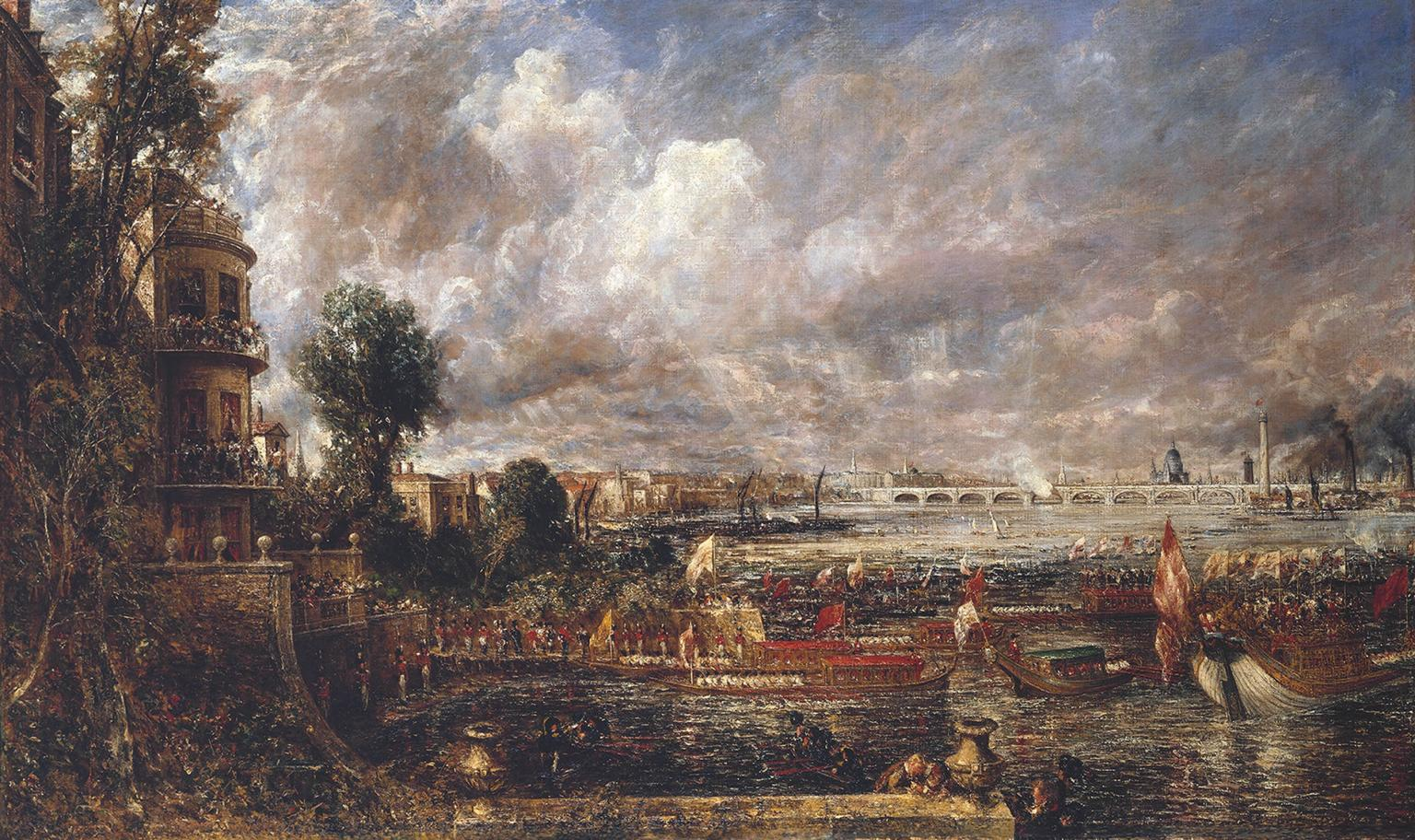
John Constable, The Opening of Waterloo Bridge, purchased from Agnew's in 1987 by the Tate Gallery, Tate Britain.

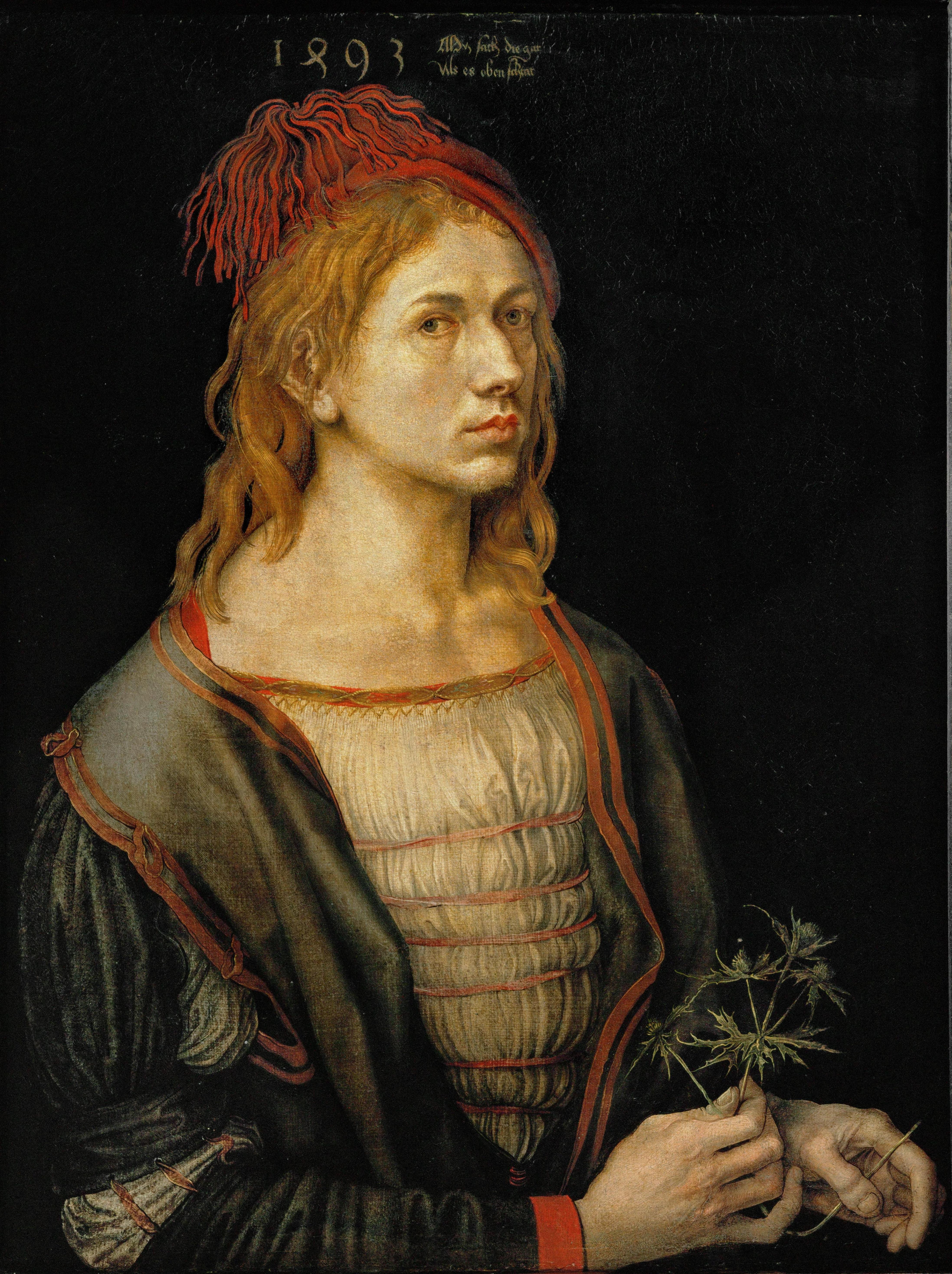
Albrecht Dürer, Portrait of the Artist Holding a Thistle purchased from Agnew's in 1900 by Leopold Goldschmidt, present owner: Louvre, Paris.

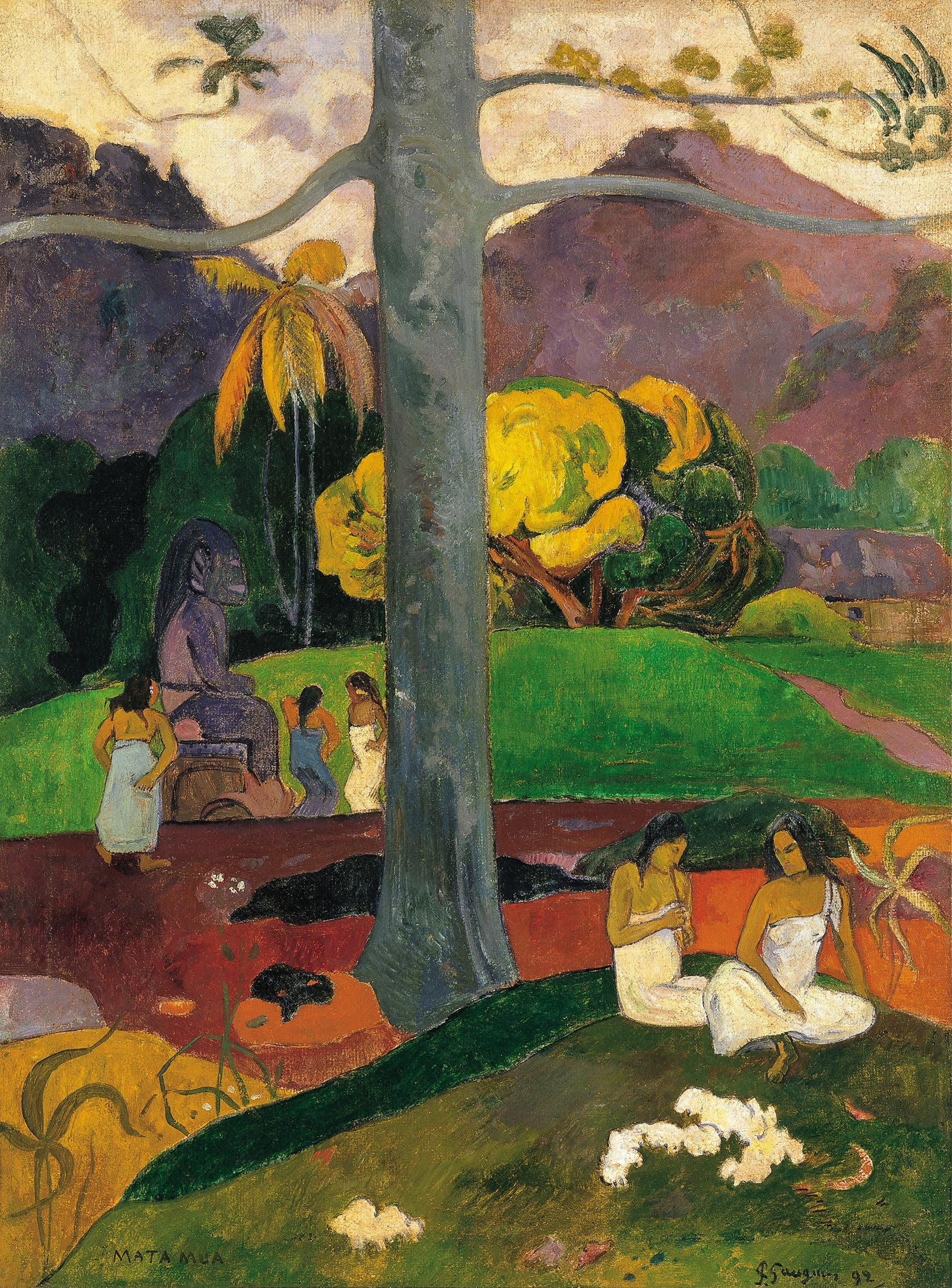
Paul Gauguin, Mata Mua - in olden times, purchased by Agnew's in 1984 on behalf of Baron Thyssen and Jaime Ortiz-Patiño, present owner: Thyssen-Bornemisza Museum.

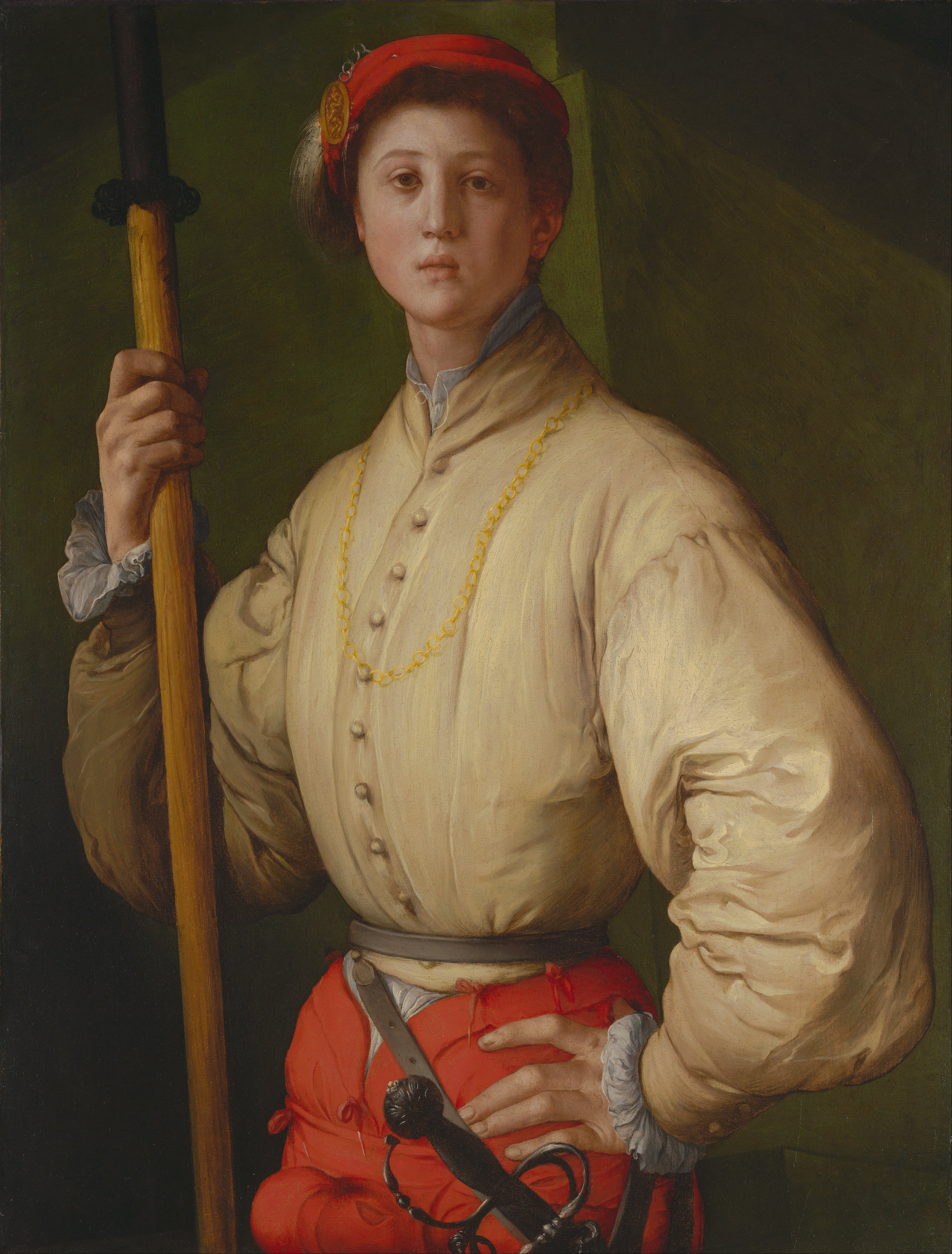
Pontormo, Portrait of a Halberdier, purchased by Agnew's on behalf of the J. Paul Getty Museum in 1989.

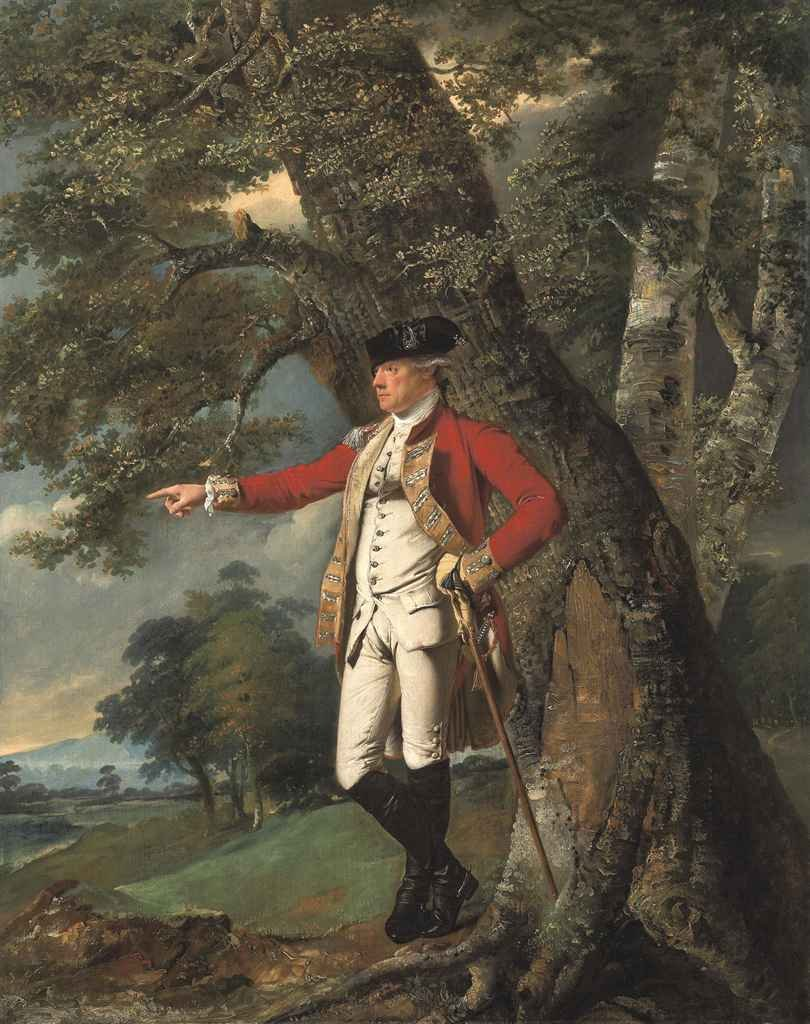
Joseph Wright of Derby, Portrait of Colonel Charles Heathcote, oil on canvas, 127 x 100 cm, purchased from Agnew's in 2017 by the Cleveland Museum of Art.
