= Alessandri Altarpiece =

15th c. painting by Filippo Lippi

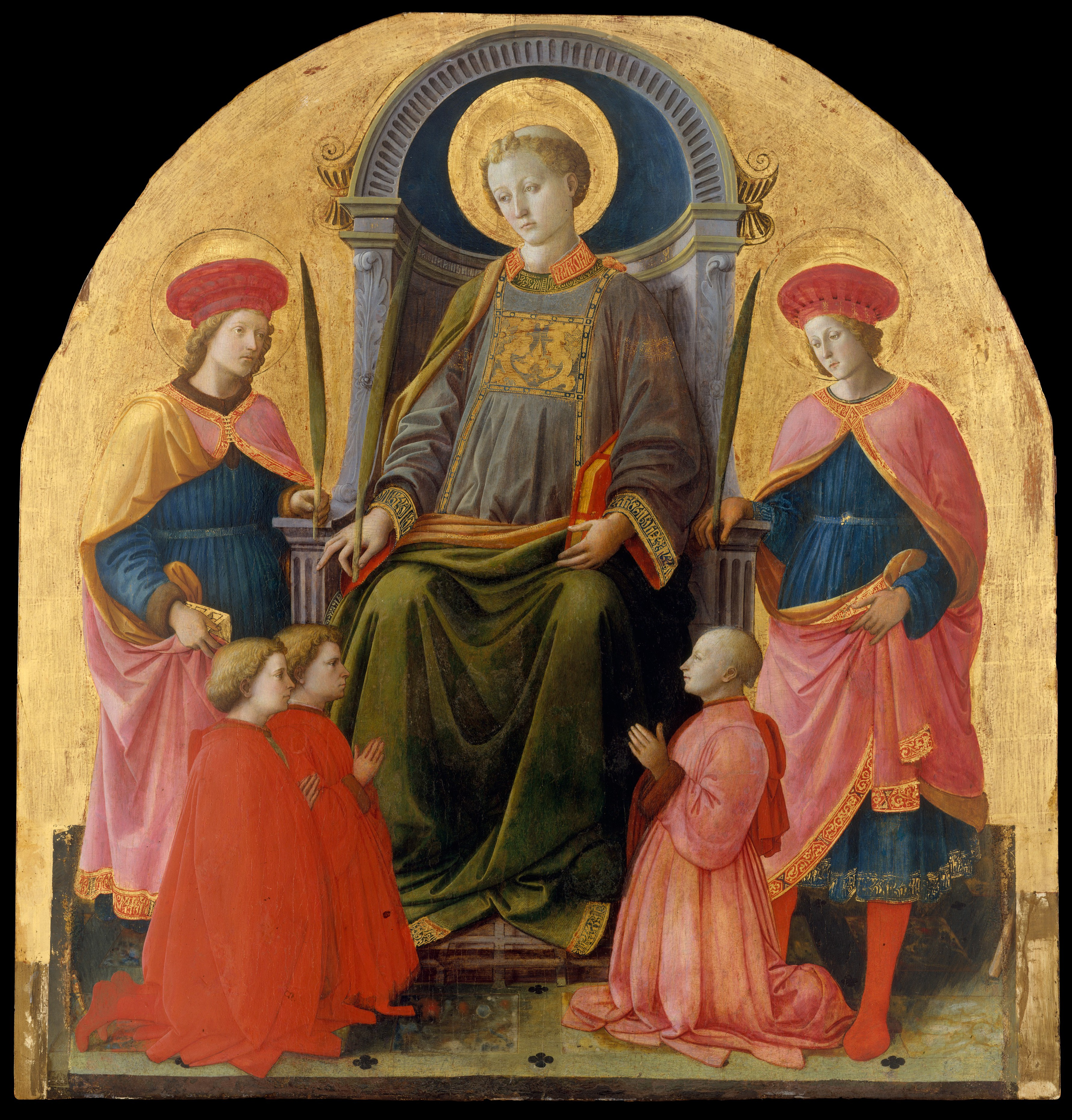
Alessandri Altarpiece by Filippo Lippi

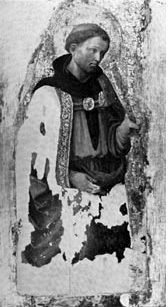
Damage to the left of the painting

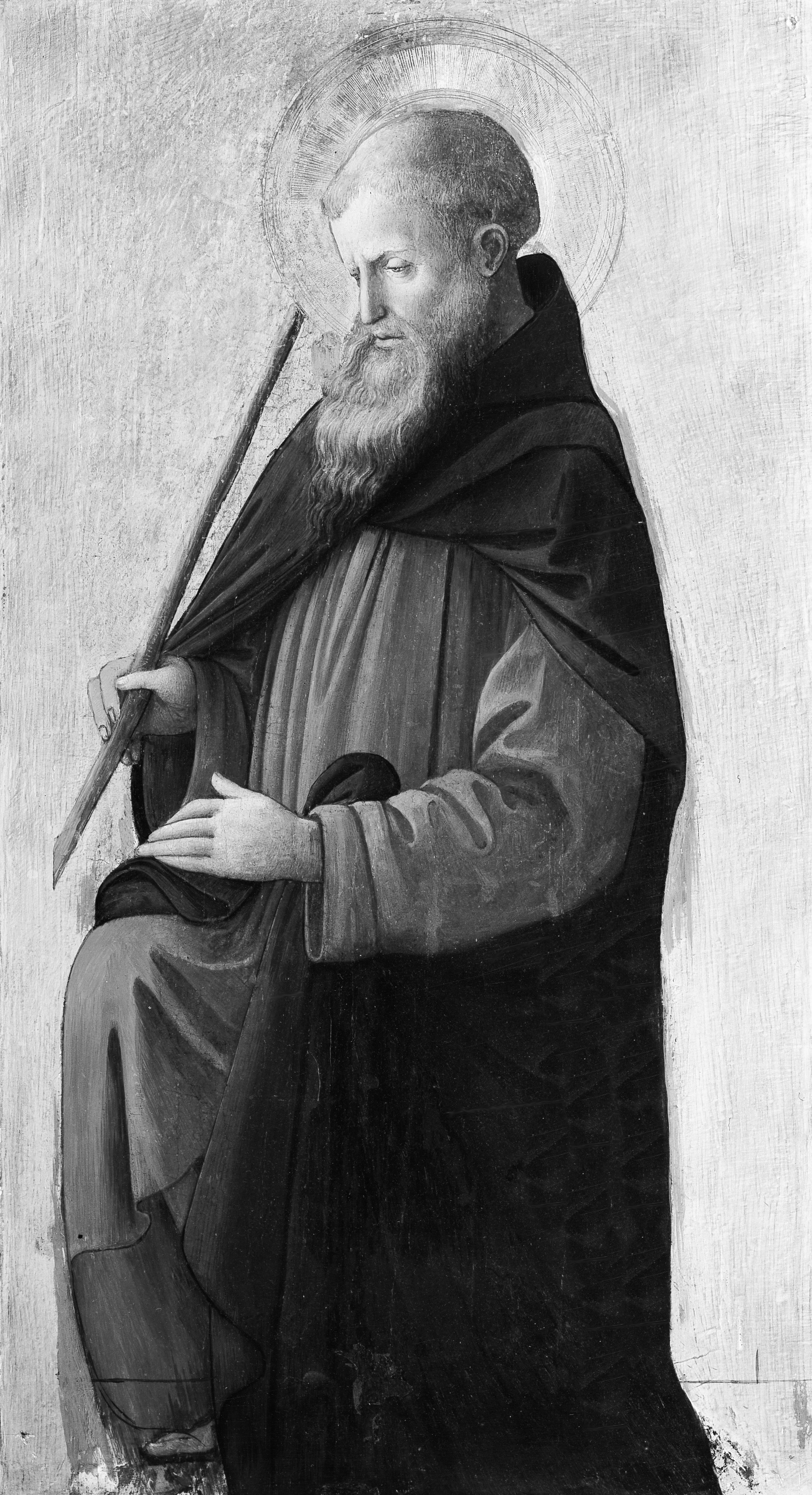
Damage to the right of the painting

The Alessandri Altarpiece is a tempera on panel painting by Filippo Lippi, also known as Saint Lawrence Enthroned Between Saints Cosmas and Damian and Donors and Saint Lawrence Enthroned with Saints and Donors. It is now in the Metropolitan Museum of Art in New York.

The dating is uncertain - most art critics place it between the mid 1440s and the early 1450s, though some hypothesize it may have been a family gift to Ginevra degli Alessandri on her marriage to Giovanni di Cosimo de' Medici on 20 January 1453. The work is originally thought to have consisted of a single panel, later divided up and finally restored into its present form as a triptych by Federico Zeri in 1971 by repainting vast areas at the base of the panel and Lawrence's legs. Another kneeling figure is almost completely lost and other parts of the painted surface are damaged or lost.

== History ==
It is thought to be the painting mentioned in Vasari's Lives of the Artists as being produced for the Alessandri family villa at Vincigliata near Florence. Around 1790 it was moved to the family's palazzo in Borgo Albizi in Florence. In 1912 it was sold to the London art dealer Arthur Joseph Sulley, who sold it on to the dealer Joseph Duveen in New York, who sold it to J. P. Morgan. His son J. P. Morgan Jr. sold it to the Met via Knoedler in 1935.
