= Frank Holl =

English painter (1845–1888)

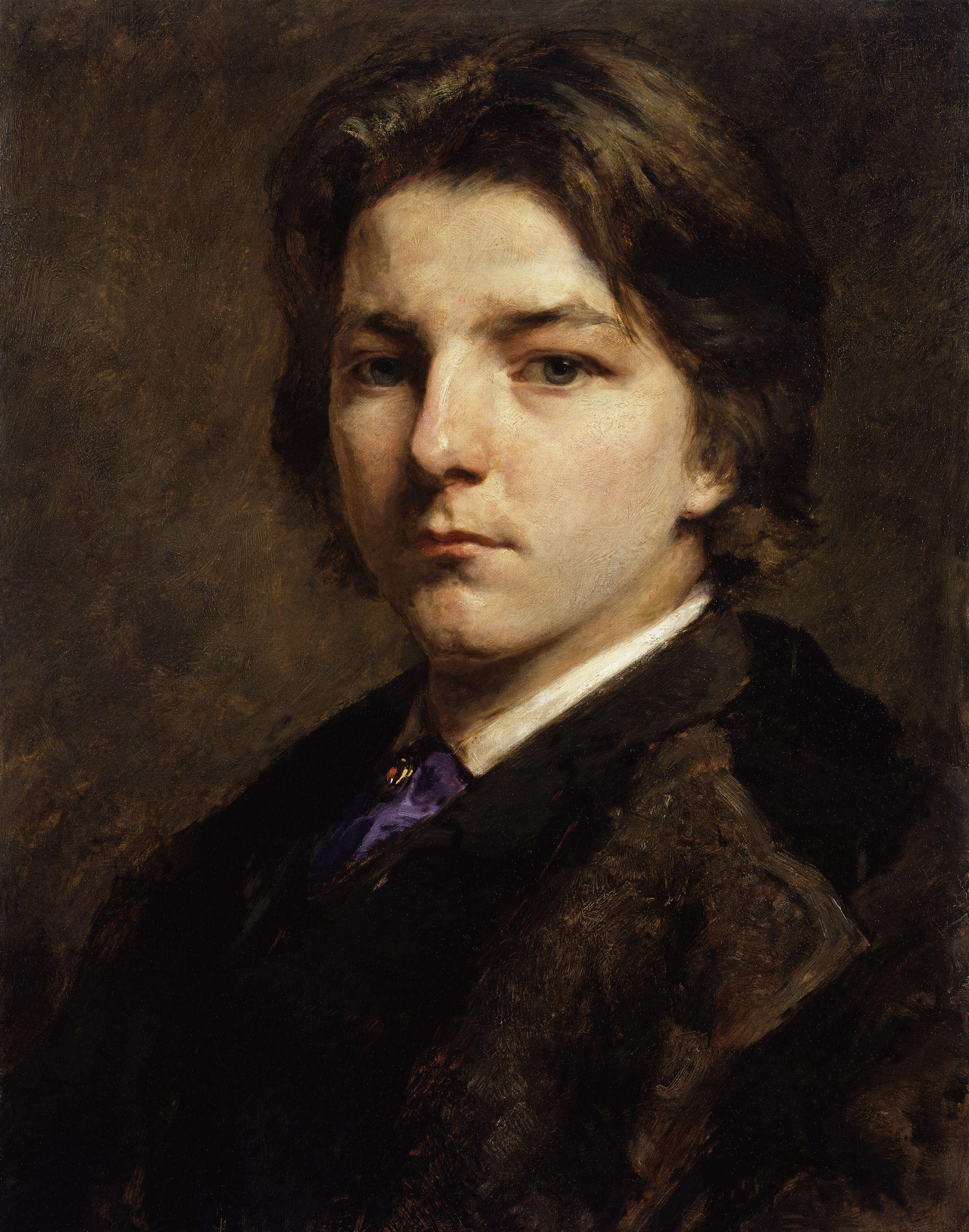
- Self-portrait, 1863
- Born: Francis Montague Holl; 4 July 1845; London, England
- Died: 31 July 1888 (aged 43); London, England
- Resting place: Highgate Cemetery
- Education: University College School
- Occupation: Painter
- Parent: Francis Holl (father)

Francis Montague Holl RA (London 4 July 1845 – 31 July 1888 London) was a British painter, specialising in somewhat sentimental paintings with a moment from a narrative situation, often drawing on the trends of social realism and the problem picture in Victorian painting. He was also, especially in his later years when the demand for social realism slackened, a portrait painter, mostly of official-type portraits of distinguished and therefore elderly men, including members of the royal family.

He died in his early 40s, which some contemporaries attributed to overwork, as he had been very busy in the last twenty years of his life. His reputation fell considerably after his death, and the exhibition at the Watts Gallery in 2013 and its catalogue were the first such attention he had received for a century.

== Life ==
Holl was born in London to the family of noted engravers, being the son of Francis Holl ARA, as well as a nephew of William Holl the Younger and a grandson of William Holl the Elder, whose profession he originally intended to follow. He was educated mainly at University College School. Entering the Royal Academy Schools as a probationer in painting in 1860, he rapidly progressed, winning silver and gold medals, and making his debut as an exhibitor in 1864 with A Portrait, and Turned out of Church, a subject picture. A Fern Gatherer (1865); The Ordeal (1866); Convalescent (the somewhat grim pathos of which attracted much attention), and Faces in the Fire (1867), succeeded. Holl gained the travelling studentship in 1868; the successful work was characteristic of the young painter's mood, being The Lord gave, and the Lord hath taken away.

In 1869 Holl was recruited as an artist by the wood-engraver and social reformer William Luson Thomas, to work on Thomas's newly founded newspaper, The Graphic. Admirers of Holl included Vincent van Gogh, who in letters to his brother Theo and friend Anthon van Rappard expressed his admiration for Holl. Whilst living in London van Gogh fastidiously cut out and collected Holl’s prints published in The Graphic.

In 1886, Holl produced a portrait of Millais as his diploma work, but his health rapidly declined and he died at Hampstead, north London, on 31 July 1888. He is buried in a vault on the western side of Highgate Cemetery and was joined by his wife Annie Laura on 10 June 1931, who died aged 86 at their home, Three Gables, Fitzjohn's Avenue, Hampstead. There is also a memorial to Holl at St Paul's Cathedral.

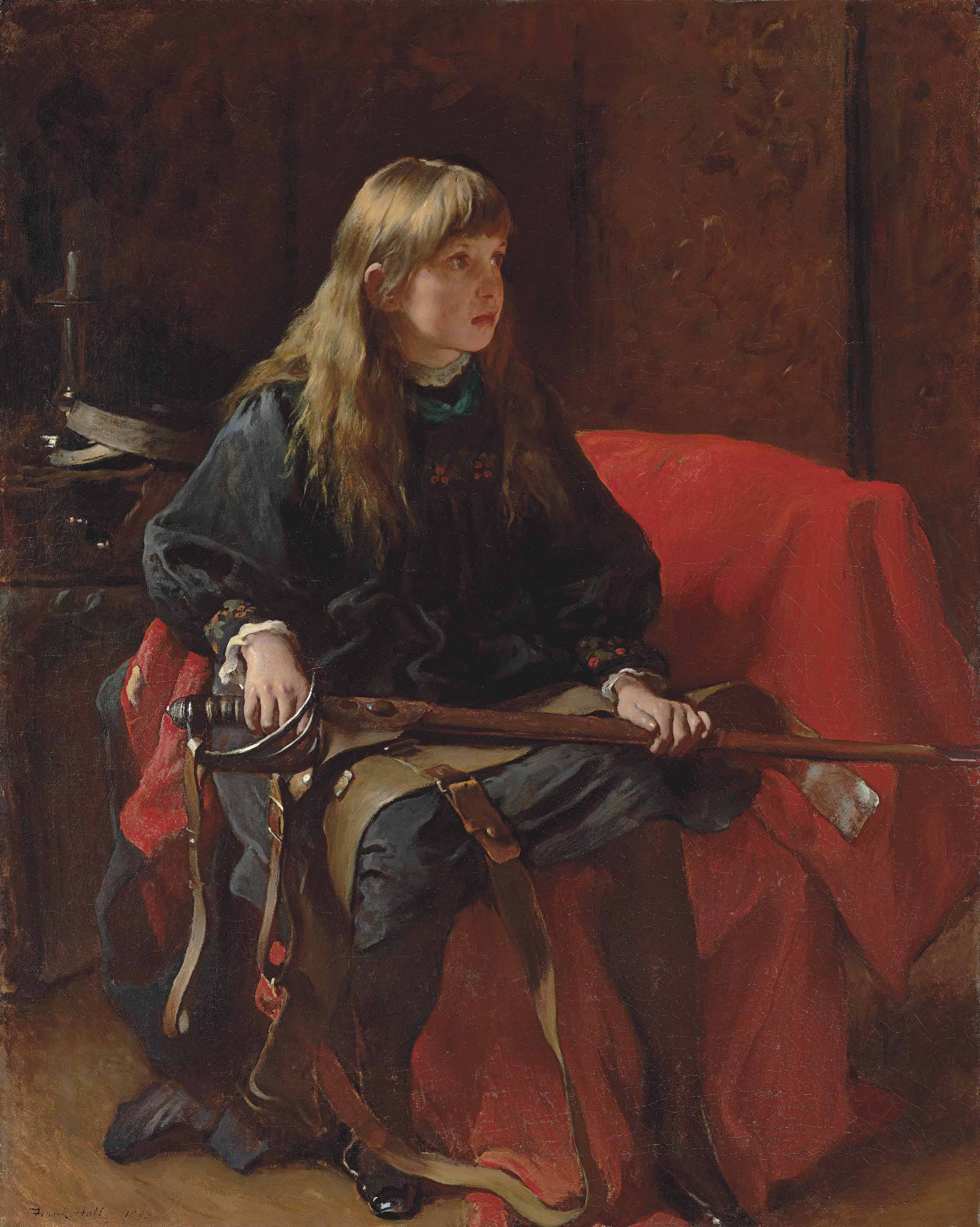
Did you ever kill anybody Father?, 1883

Frank Holl: Emerging from the Shadows was a 2013 exhibition at the Watts Gallery in Surrey, England which included 14 paintings by the artist. Many of Holl's paintings have been lost, however; their importance as pieces of social realism ensures that the ones around will retain their value. His painting Leaving Home was recently rediscovered.

== Works ==
Overwork undermined Holl's health, but his reputation was assured by the studentship picture. In 1870 he painted Better is a Dinner of Herbs where Love is, than a Stalled Ox and Hatred therewith; No Tidings from the Sea, a scene in a fisherman's cottage, in 1871—a story told with breath-catching pathos and power; I am the Resurrection and the Life (1872); Leaving Home (1873), Deserted (1874), both of which had great success; Her First-born, girls carrying a baby to the grave (1876); and Going Home (1877).

In 1877 he painted the two pictures Hush and Hushed. Newgate, Committed for Trial, first attested the breaking down of the painter's health in 1878. In this year he was elected A.R.A., and exhibited The Gifts of the Fairies, The Daughter of the House, Absconded, and a portrait of Samuel Cousins the mezzotint engraver.

Holl was overwhelmed with commissions, which he would not decline. The consequences of this strain upon a constitution which was never strong were more or less, though unequally, manifest in Ordered to the Front, a soldier's departure (1880); Home Again, its sequel, in 1883 (after which he was made Royal Academician).

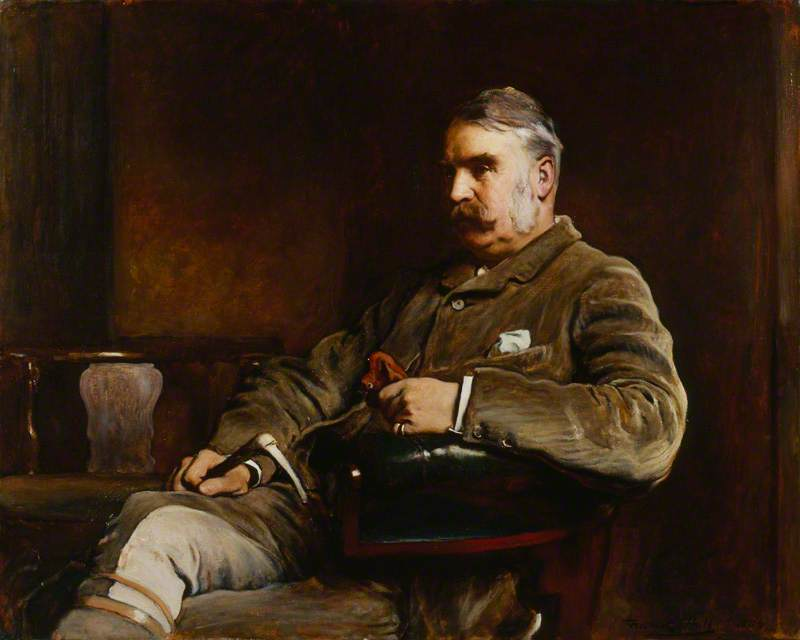
W.S. Gilbert, 1886, National Portrait Gallery

Holl's major portraits include likenesses of Lord Roberts, painted for Queen Victoria (1882); the Prince of Wales (1882–83); Lord Dufferin, the Duke of Cleveland (1885); Lord Overstone, John Bright, Mr Gladstone, Joseph Chamberlain, John Tenniel, Earl Spencer, Viscount Cranbrook, and a score of others.

Did you ever kill anybody Father? (1883), showing a young girl with her father's sabre, fetched £74,500, below the estimate of £80,000 to £120,000, at Christie's in 2014. He used his daughter Nina as a model, and the sword of Lord Wolseley, whose portrait he was painting at the time. As recorded in the biography by another daughter:

[Nina] had one day wandered into the studio after a sitting....calmly mounted the throne and taken up Lord Wolseley’s sword, which happened to be lying across the chair. She contemplated it gravely for a few moments and then suddenly looking up said, 'Did Lord Wolseley ever kill anybody with this, father?'

== Gallery ==
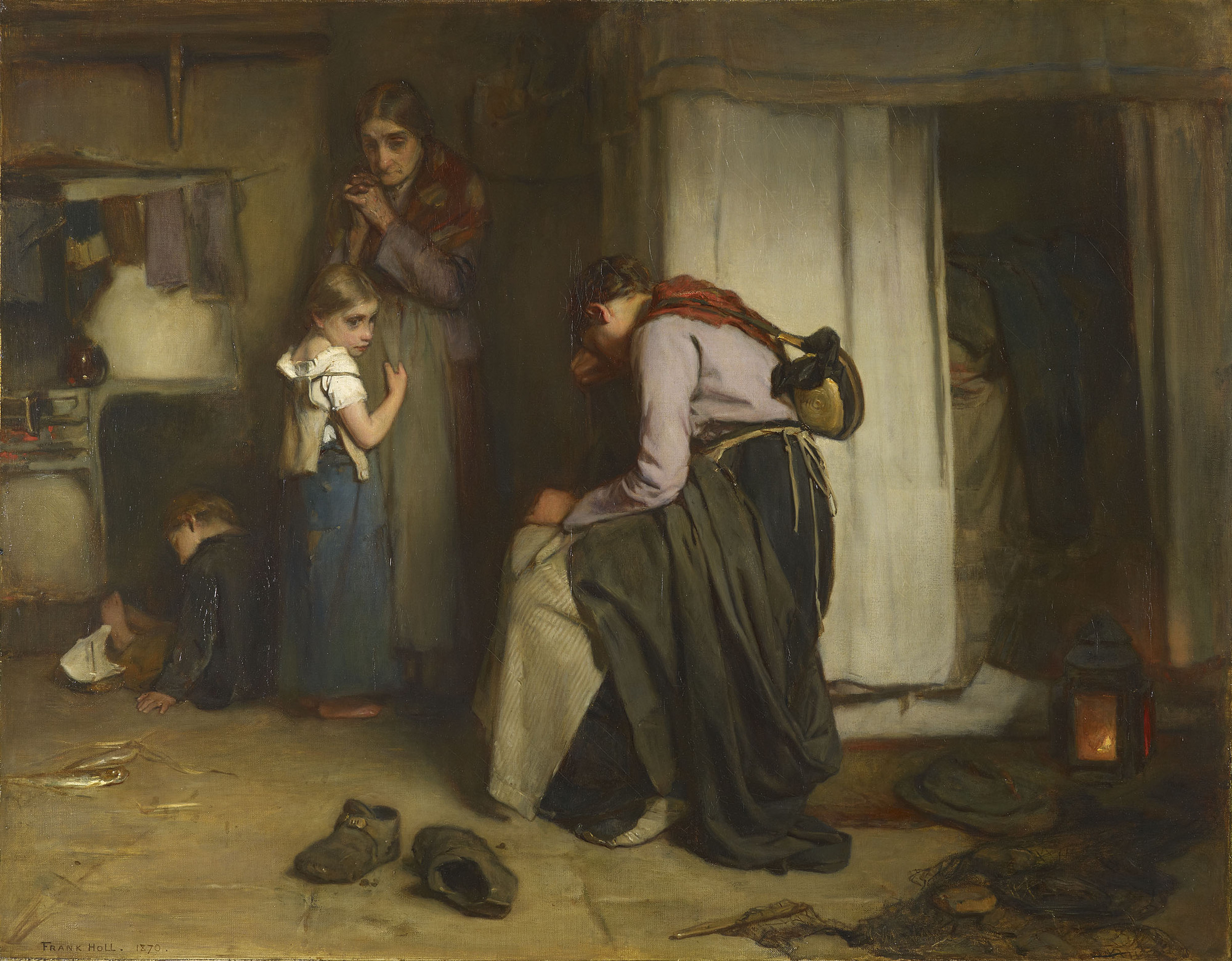
No Tidings from the Sea, 1870, Royal Collection

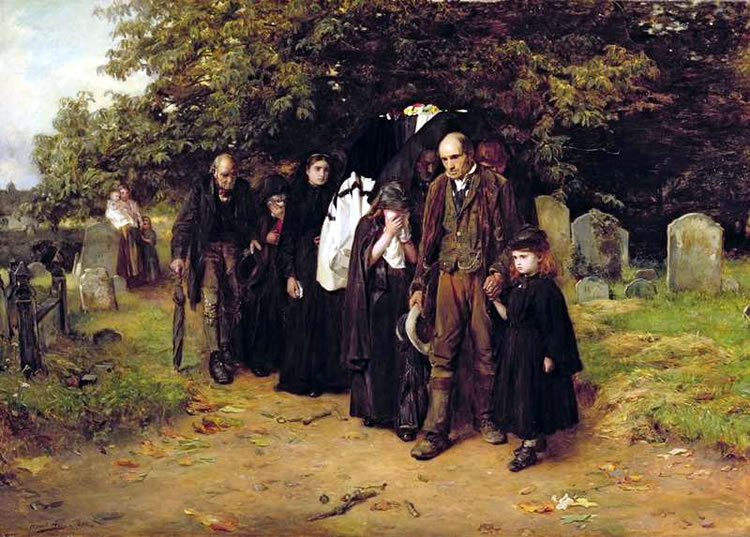
I am the Resurrection and the Life, or, A Village Funeral, 1872

The Daughter of the House, 1879

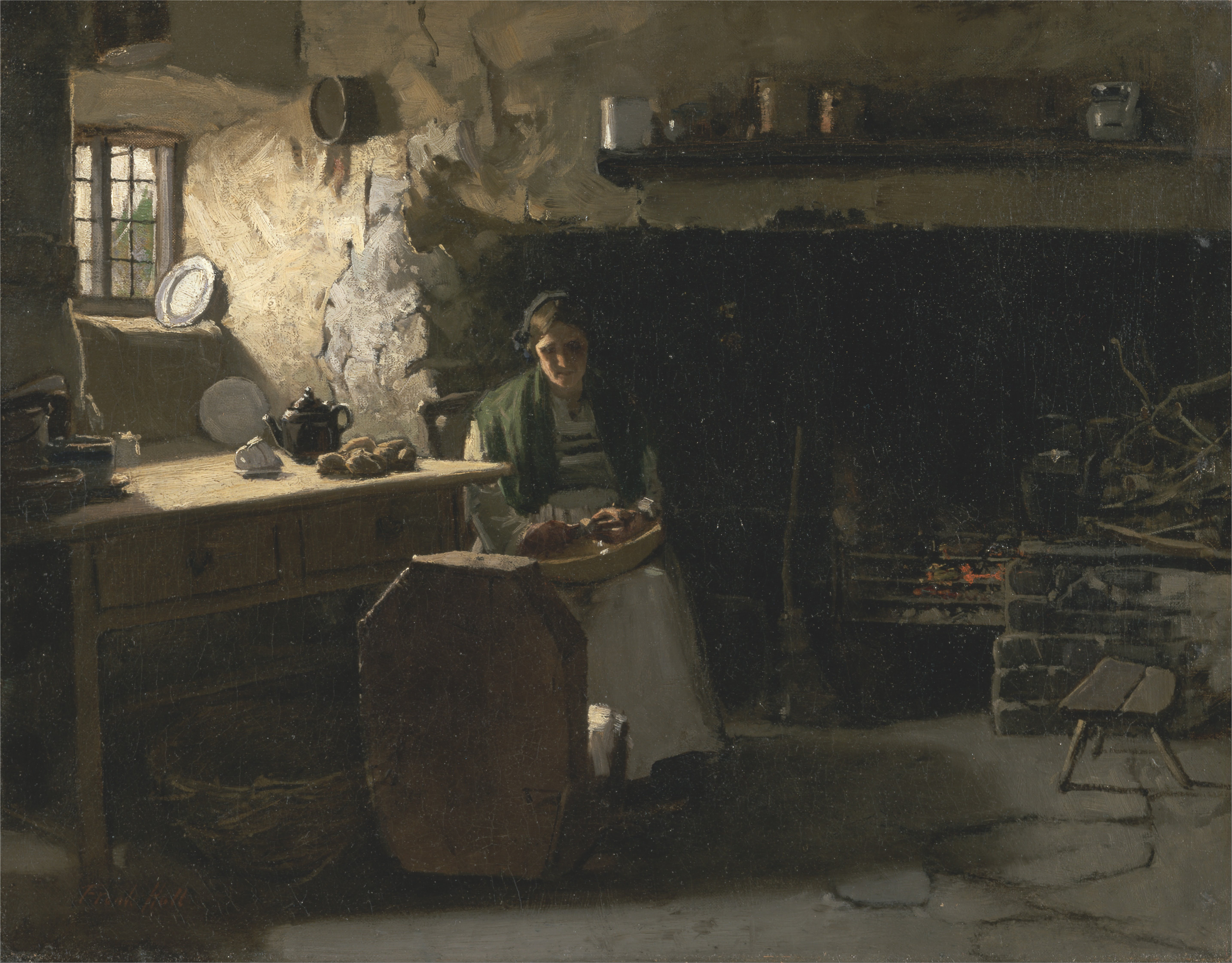
Peeling Potatoes, c. 1880

Home Again!, 1881

Portrait of William Agnew, 1883

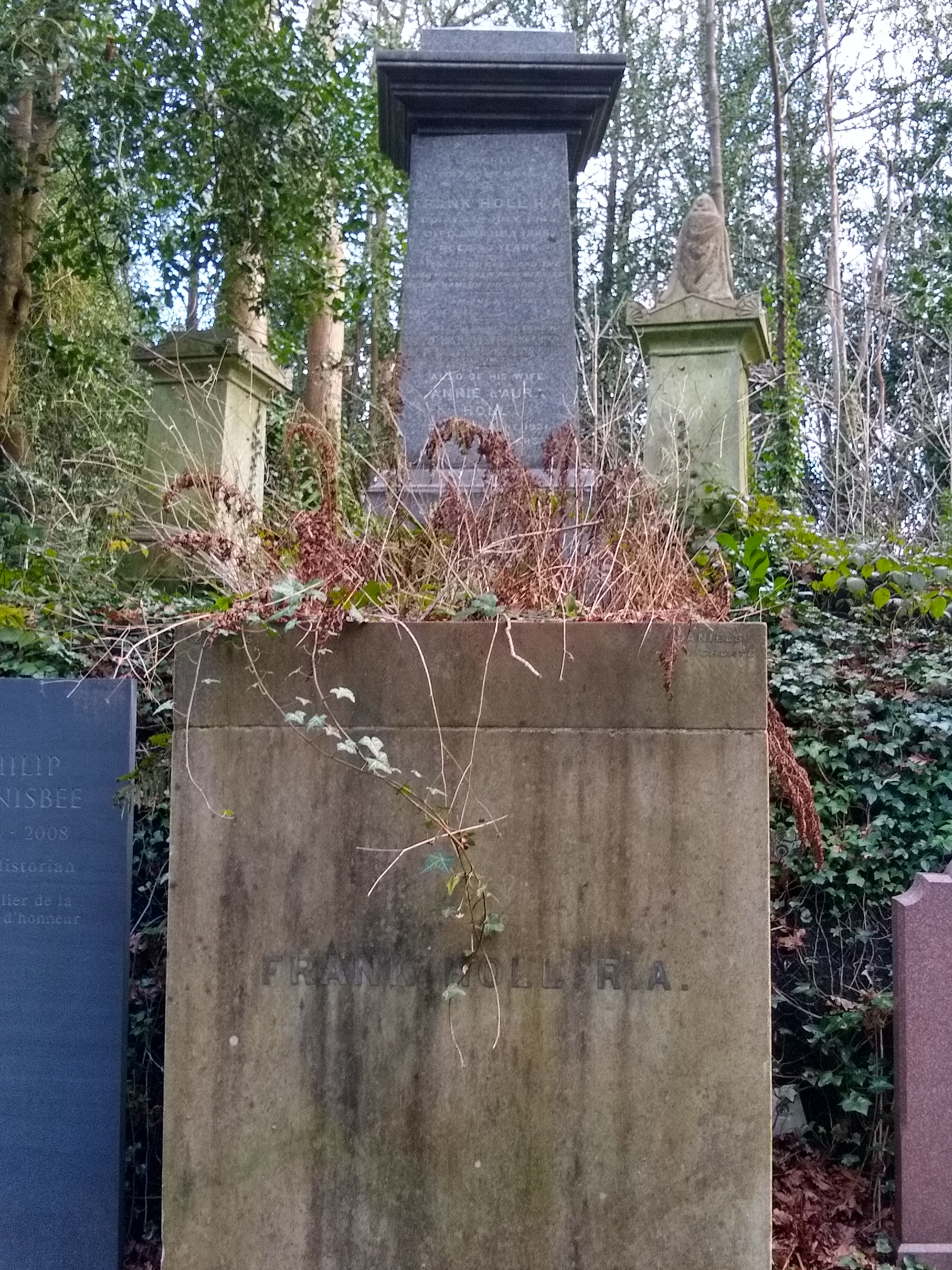
Family vault of Frank Holl at Highgate Cemetery (west)

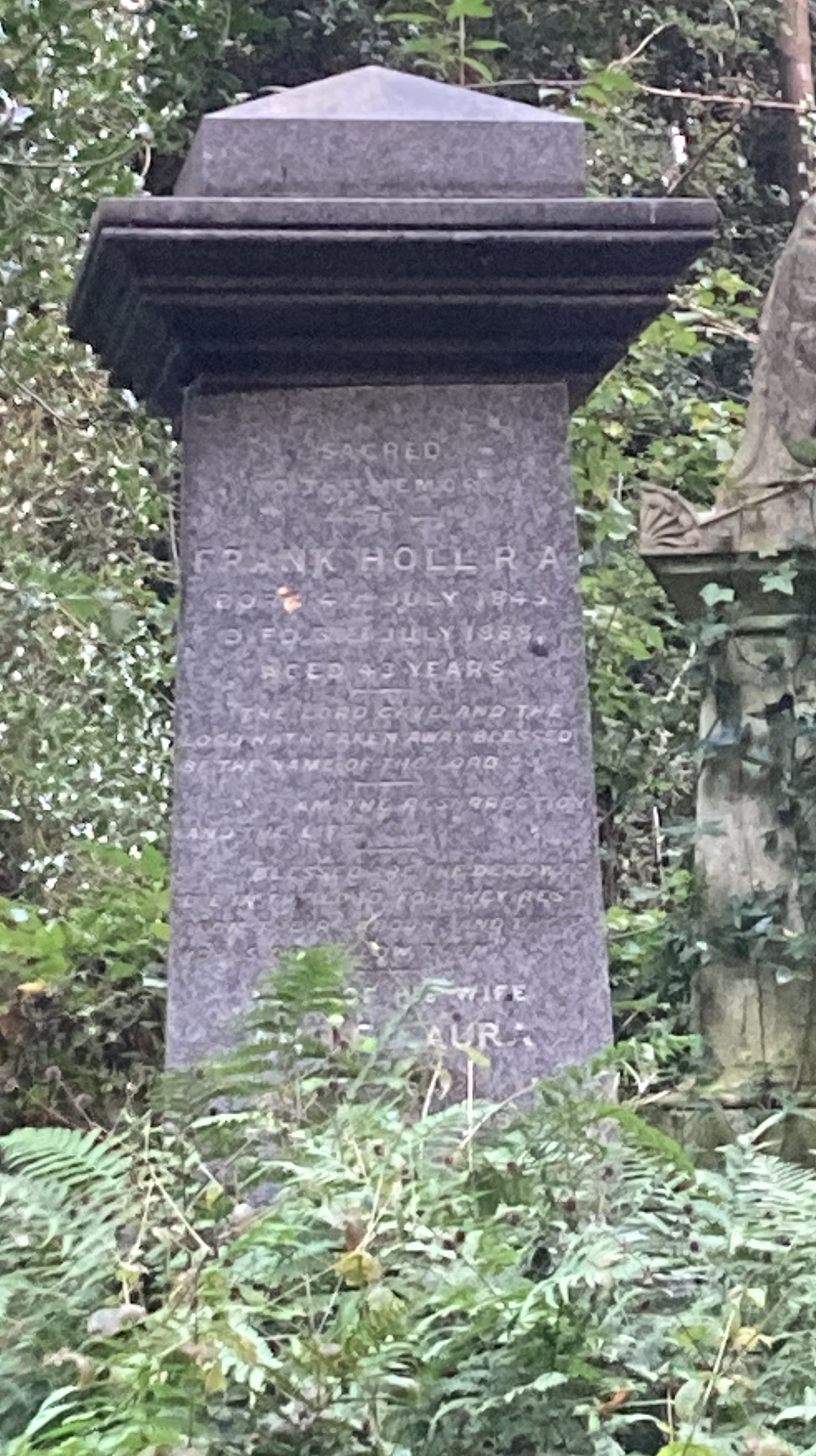
Monument above the vault of Frank Holl in Highgate Cemetery
