= Portrait of a Man Holding Gloves =

1648 painting by Rembrandt

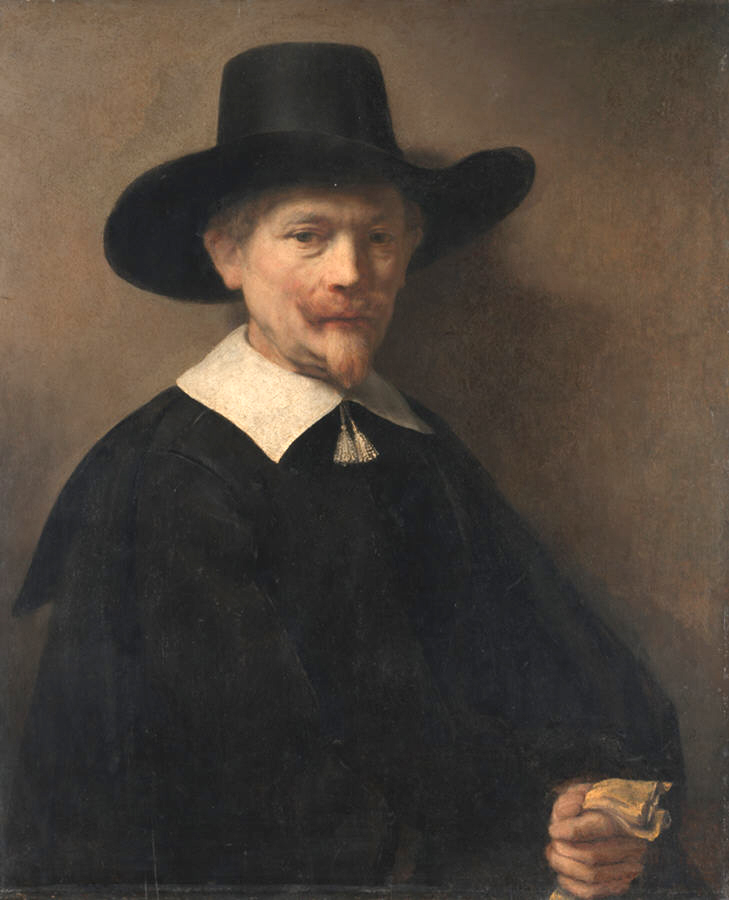
- Artist: Rembrandt
- Year: 1648
- Medium: Oil on wood
- Dimensions: 80 cm × 67.3 cm (31 in × 26.5 in)
- Location: Metropolitan Museum of Art; New York City

Portrait of a Man Holding Gloves is a 1648 oil on mahogany panel portrait by Rembrandt, now in the Metropolitan Museum of Art in New York.

== Description ==
Its first recorded owner was Jacques I, Prince of Monaco. On 22 January 1812, it was sold from the collection of one "monsieur de Séréville" for 5,071 francs at the Paillet art dealer in Paris - the buyer was Lebrun, on behalf of Charles-Maurice de Talleyrand. Alexander Baring, 1st Baron Ashburton, bought it for £500 in 1831.

It hung in the Baring family mansion of The Grange in Northington, Hampshire, until 1907, when Francis Baring, 5th Baron Ashburton, sold it to Sulleya and Co., a London art dealer. It was later owned by the Parisian art dealer Charles Sedelmeyer, who in 1909 sold it for $125,000 to the New York dealer Benjamin Altman, who in 1913 bequeathed it to its present owner.

== Sources ==
- http://www.metmuseum.org/collection/the-collection-online/search/437401
- Exhibition of Works by the Old Masters and by Deceased Masters of the British School. Winter Exhibition, Royal Academy of Arts, Londen, 1890, cat.nr. 152 (as Portrait of a Man; loaned by Lord Ashburton).
