= Lotte Laserstein =

German-Swedish painter (1898–1993)

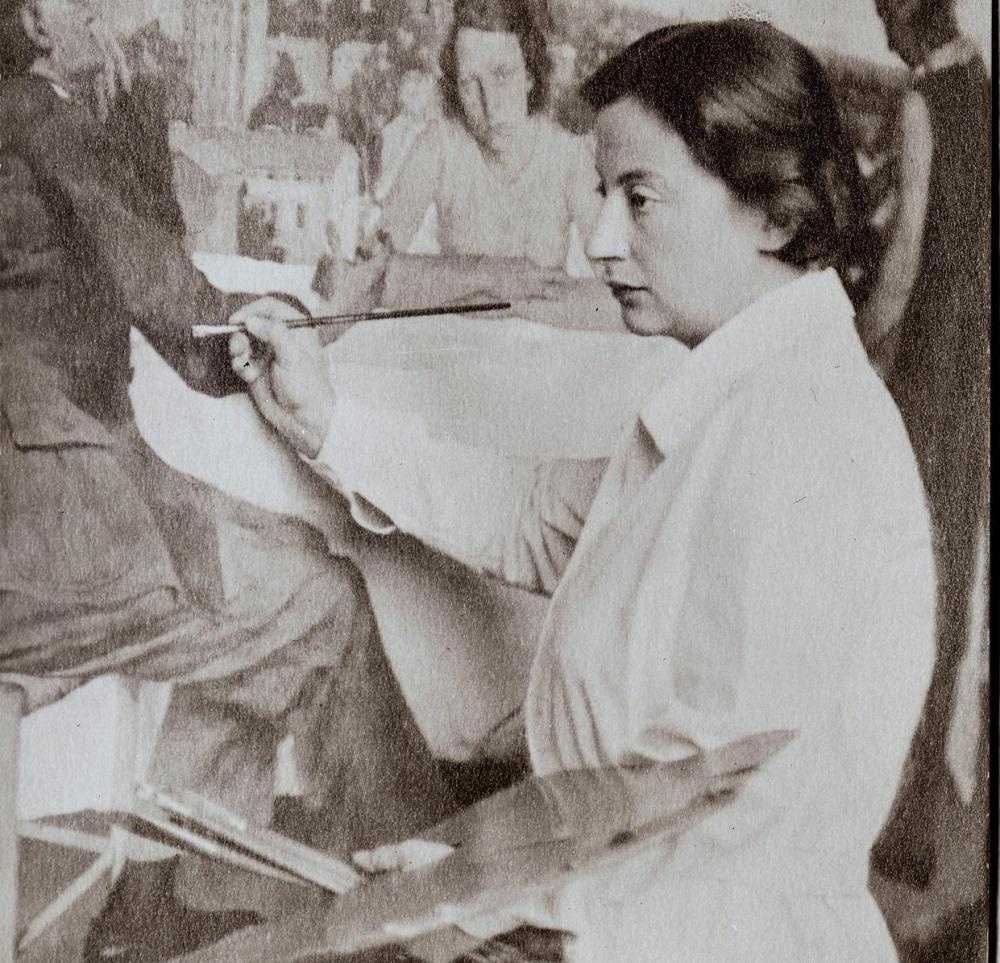
- Lotte Laserstein painting "Evening over Potsdam" photographed by Wanda von Debschitz-Kunowski in 1930
- Born: 28 November 1898; Preussisch Holland, East Prussia, German Empire
- Died: 21 January 1993 (aged 94); Kalmar, Sweden
- Known for: Painting
- Awards: Gold Medal, Berlin Art Academy (1925)

Lotte Laserstein (28 November 1898 – 21 January 1993) was a German-Swedish painter. She was an artist of figurative paintings in Germany's Weimar Republic. The National Socialist regime and its anti-Semitism forced her to leave Germany in 1937 and to emigrate to Sweden. In Sweden, she continued to work as a portraitist and painter of landscapes until her death. The paintings she created during the 1920s and 1930s fit into the movement of New Objectivity in Germany.

== Life ==
Laserstein was born in Preussisch Holland, German Empire in 1898. Her father, Hugo, was a pharmacist, and her mother, Meta, was a pianist, piano teacher, and a porcelain painter. Christened as a child, she grew up in an assimilated German-Jewish household.

She received her artistic training at the Prussian Academy of Arts (Preußische Akademie der Künste), which she entered only shortly after female students were allowed. Here, Laserstein studied under Erich Wolfsfeld. In her final two years at the academy, she advanced to become one of his 'Atelier Meisterschüler' or 'star pupil'. This entitled her to her own studio, as well as free access to models.

The paintings she produced between her graduation in 1927 and 1933 in Berlin are considered to be her best works, and were shown in 20 exhibits across the city's galleries and museums. Laserstein favored female models and the representation of female lifeworlds blended "social representation with painterly presence". While her oeuvre encompasses approximately 10,000 works, only 300 paintings and 100 drawings are verified for her Berlin years.

After her emigration to Sweden, she took on mostly commissioned portrait works. Her attempts to save the lives of her mother and her sister, Käte, from Nazi persecution by bringing them to Sweden failed. Her mother was murdered in 1943 in the Ravensbrück concentration camp, and Käte spent three years in hiding (died in Berlin in 1965).

Berlin in the 1920s was a center of cultural production as well as political and economic struggle. Laserstein painted cadavers to illustrate text books to obtain money during the period of hyperinflation.

During this time, women were growing in independence and were increasingly able to enter the workplace. Laserstein depicted contemporary women of many fashions, including New Woman types, who adopted a more masculine look, and female nudes. As a single professional woman, Laserstein herself embodied the New Woman, and her androgynous look is evident in her many self-portraits, for example, Self-portrait with A Cat (1928) at the Leicester Museum and Art Gallery.

During the Nazi period in Germany, Laserstein emigrated to Sweden, where she stayed in Stockholm and the city of Kalmar. It has been suggested that this move contributed to her legacy falling into obscurity in Germany. Laserstein traveled and painted in many places around the world after the Holocaust. Notably, she visited Berlin after the war and traveled to Israel with her friend Dr. Walter Lindenthal. She died in Kalmar on January 21, 1993.

== Works ==
Her most famous paintings, including Die Tennisspielerin (The Tennis Player, 1929), contributed to the verism of New Objectivity movement but also showed continuity with German Naturalism. Laserstein's masterpiece was the large (about 7– 8 feet wide) 1930 painting Abend über Potsdam (Evening over Potsdam), a frieze of friends sharing a meal on their terrace, with Potsdam's skyline arrayed in the far distance. The painting was so large that it required the cooperation of multiple friends to transport it. The elegiac scene references Leonardo da Vinci's Last Supper and Jan Vermeer von Delft's Milkmaid in order to convey the temporality and political stalemate of 1930.

In 2023, The Museum of Fine Arts Boston purchased a self-portrait of Lotte Laserstein simply titled "Self Portrait". It was painted around 1932 and shows the artist looking out at the viewer with a subtle smile and a brush raised to her lips.

== Legacy ==
Laserstein was rediscovered in Germany in 1987, when Thomas Agnew & Sons and the Belgrave Gallery organized a joint exhibition and sale of works from her personal collection, including Abend über Potsdam, which is now in the Neue Nationalgalerie, Berlin. Laserstein attended the exhibition together with her close friend and model of many decades, Traute (Gertrud) Rose.

Her painting Traute Washing was the first purchase by the National Museum of Women in the Arts with its own funds.

In 1993, the first retrospective of Laserstein's work occurred in Kalmar, Sweden, to which she donated some of her paintings.

In 2003, the first comprehensive retrospective of Laserstein's oeuvre was held in Berlin at the Verborgene Museum. In-depth research was carried out by Anna-Carola Krausse which was synthesized in the exhibition catalogue, Lotte Laserstein: My Only Reality.

In 2009, the Berlinische Galerie acquired the artist's documentary estate as a private donation. In addition to photographs of her work, the material includes sketchbooks, private and professional correspondence, documents on her participation in exhibitions, and books from Laserstein's library. The main part of the estate covers Laserstein's time in Sweden; hardly any documents have survived from the Berlin period.

Donation certificates from Laserstein's friends in her honor from the Jewish National Fund and Magen David Adom show her connection to Israel and the Jewish community.
