= Portrait of William Agnew =

Painting by Frank Holl

- Artist: Frank Holl
- Year: 1883
- Type: Oil on canvas, portrait painting
- Dimensions: 260 cm × 320 cm (101 in × 127 in)
- Location: National Portrait Gallery, London

Portrait of William Agnew is an 1883 portrait painting by the British artist Frank Holl. It depicts the politician and art dealer Agenew, shown seated in front of the painting The Wayfarer by Frederick Walker. Agnew was a key figure in the family firm Thomas Agnew & Sons as well as a Liberal Member of Parliament and a co-owner of the magazine Punch. Walker was one of the artists he strongly promoted.

The painting was displayed at the Royal Academy Exhibition of 1883 held at Burlington House in London. It is now part of the collection of the National Portrait Gallery in London, having been acquired in 2015.

== Bibliography ==
- Allen, Brian. The British Portrait, 1660-1960. Antique Collectors' Club, 1991.
