= Francis Holl =

English engraver (1815–1884)

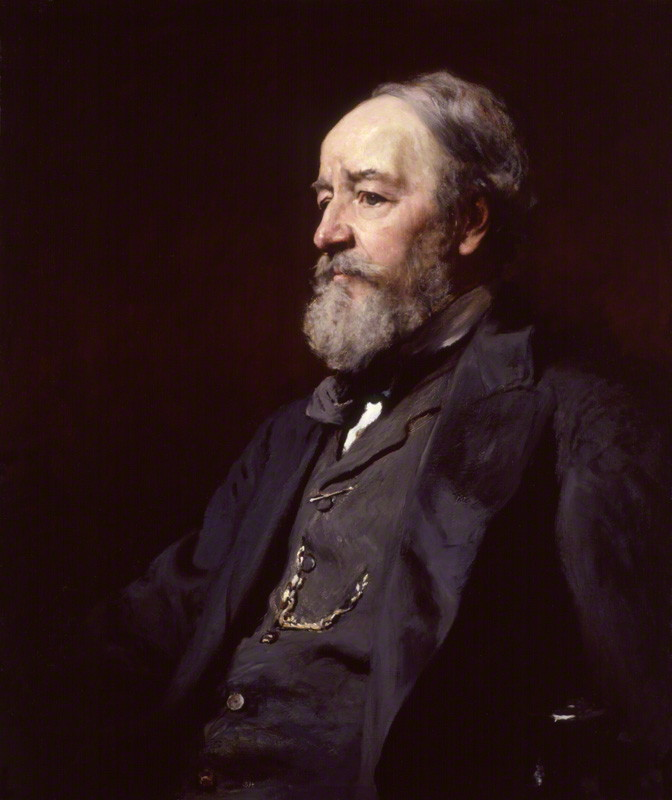
Francis Holl by his son Frank Holl.

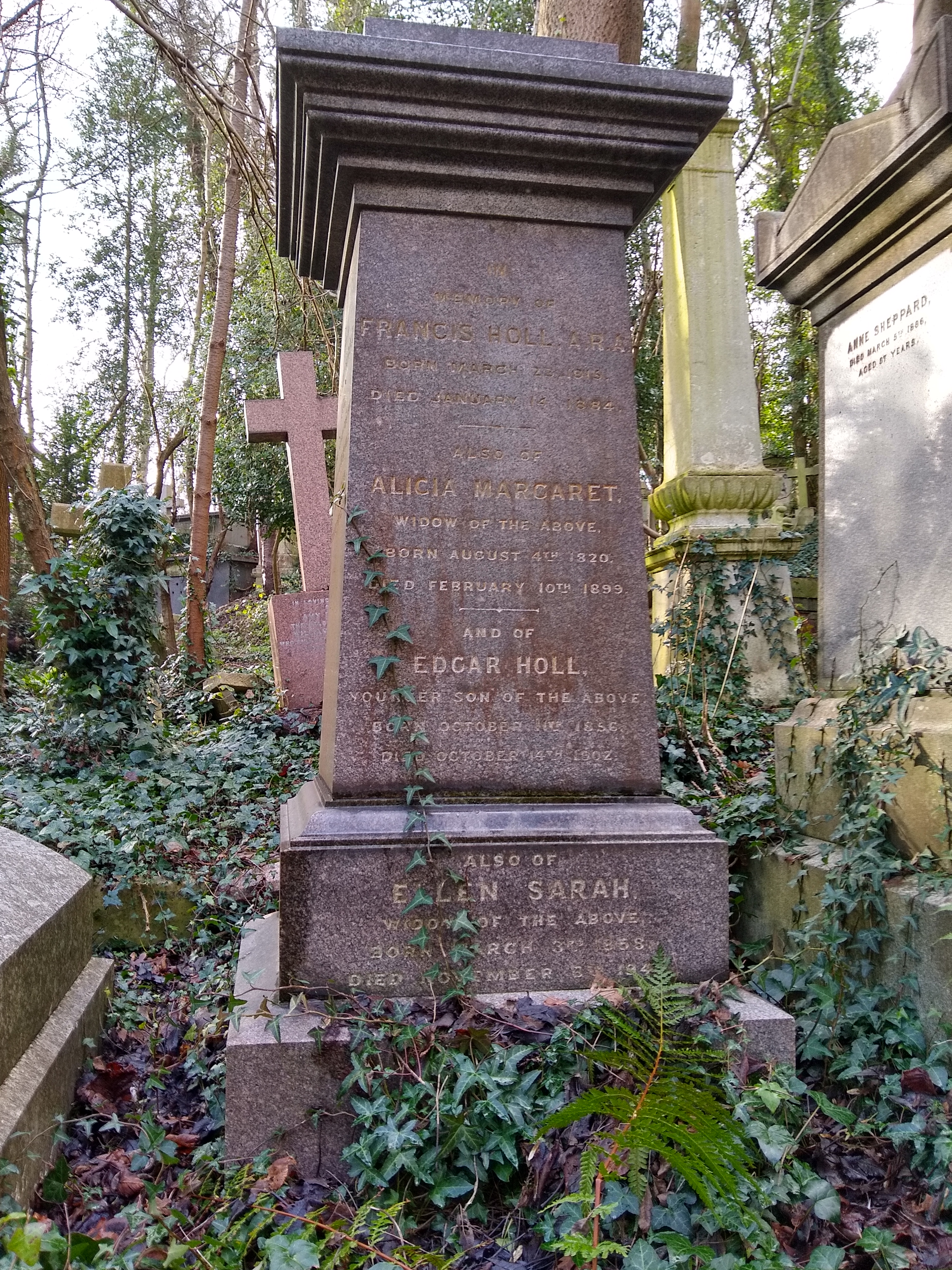
The grave of Francis Holl in Highgate Cemetery (west)

Francis Holl ARA (23 March 1815 – 14 January 1884) was a British engraver.

== Life ==
He was born 23 March 1815 in Camden Town, London, the fourth son of the prominent engraver William Holl the Elder (1771–1838), to whom he was apprenticed. The engraver William Holl the Younger was his brother.

He was both successful and fashionable, producing work for book and print publishers. He spent 25 years engraving Queen Victoria's pictures during which period he executed commissions of other royal portraits. Often working from paintings by fashionable artists, he exhibited 20 engravings at the Royal Academy between 1856 and 1883, and was elected an associate engraver in 1883.

He lived at 30 Gloucester Road, Regent's Park for many years, before moving to Elm House, Milford, Surrey, in about 1879. He died on 14 January 1884, and was buried at Highgate Cemetery. The painter Frank Holl was his son. His only daughter, Ada Mainwaring Holl, died at 31 Upper Hamilton Terrace, London on 27 March 1886.
