= William Holl the Younger =

British portrait and figure engraver (1807–1871)

William Holl the Younger (February 1807 in Plaistow, Essex – 30 January 1871) was a British portrait and figure engraver, noted for his book illustrations.

== Life ==
The eldest of four sons of William Holl the Elder (1771–1838), he was taught engraving by his father – at first stipple and later line on steel. The first portrait engraving produced on his own was that of Thomas Cranmer in May 1829 for inclusion in Edmund Lodge's Portraits of Illustrious Personages. He contributed further work to this publication between 1829 and 1835 after artists such as van Loo, Holbein, Van Dyck, Lely, Godfrey Kneller and Daniel Mytens. He was a founder member of the Chalcographic Society started by several notable engravers in 1830.

Holl also produced portraits for William Jerdan's National Portrait Gallery (1830–34) and for the 1834 Chambers's Biographical Dictionary of Eminent Scotsmen. Working with his brother Francis Holl (1815–84), he provided engraved illustrations to Finden's 1837 Tableaux of National Character and Gallery of Beauty of 1841 and to the 1840 edition of The Land of Burns. The third brother Charles Holl (c.1810–1882) aided William throughout his career. The youngest brother, Henry Benjamin Holl (1808–1884) also achieved notable success as a portrait and figure engraver and later emigrated to the US.

In the 1840s, his major works were engravings after William Powell Frith, illustrating the poems of Thomas Moore "Beauties of Moore" (1840) and scriptural engravings after various artists such as Raphael, Rembrandt, Benjamin West and James Northcote for inclusion in Blackie & Sons' Imperial Family Bible (1844) and John Kitto's Gallery of Scripture Engravings (1846–49). He also produced portraits for the Imperial Dictionary (1861) and Thomas Baines's Yorkshire Past and Present (1871–77).

== Gallery ==
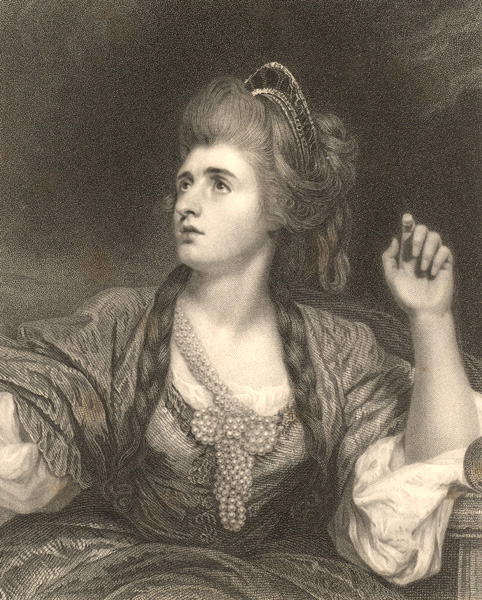
Sarah Siddons, 1835, after Joshua Reynolds

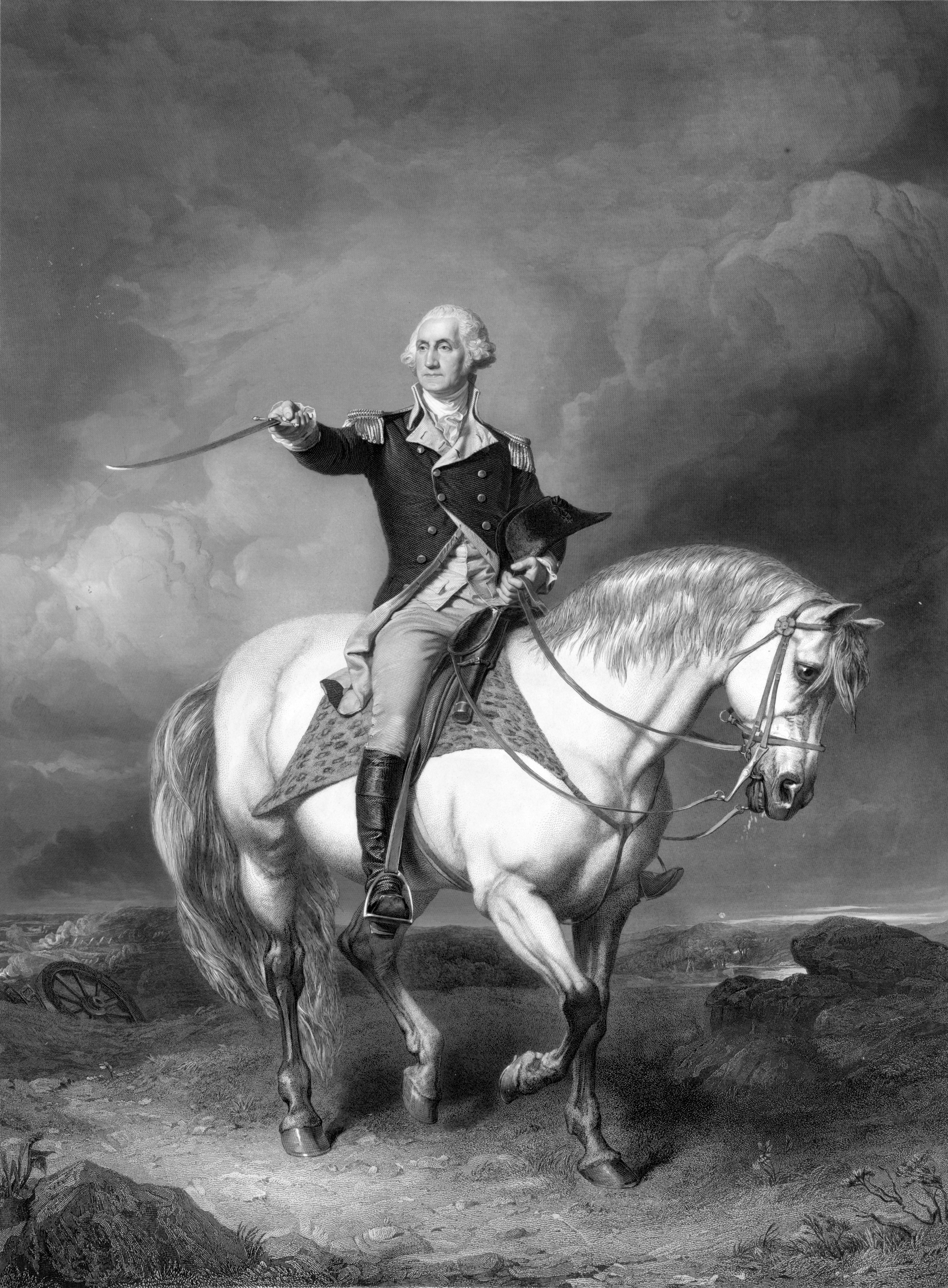
Washington Receiving a Salute on the Field of Trenton, 1865, after John Faed
