= The Mill (Rembrandt) =

Painting by Rembrandt

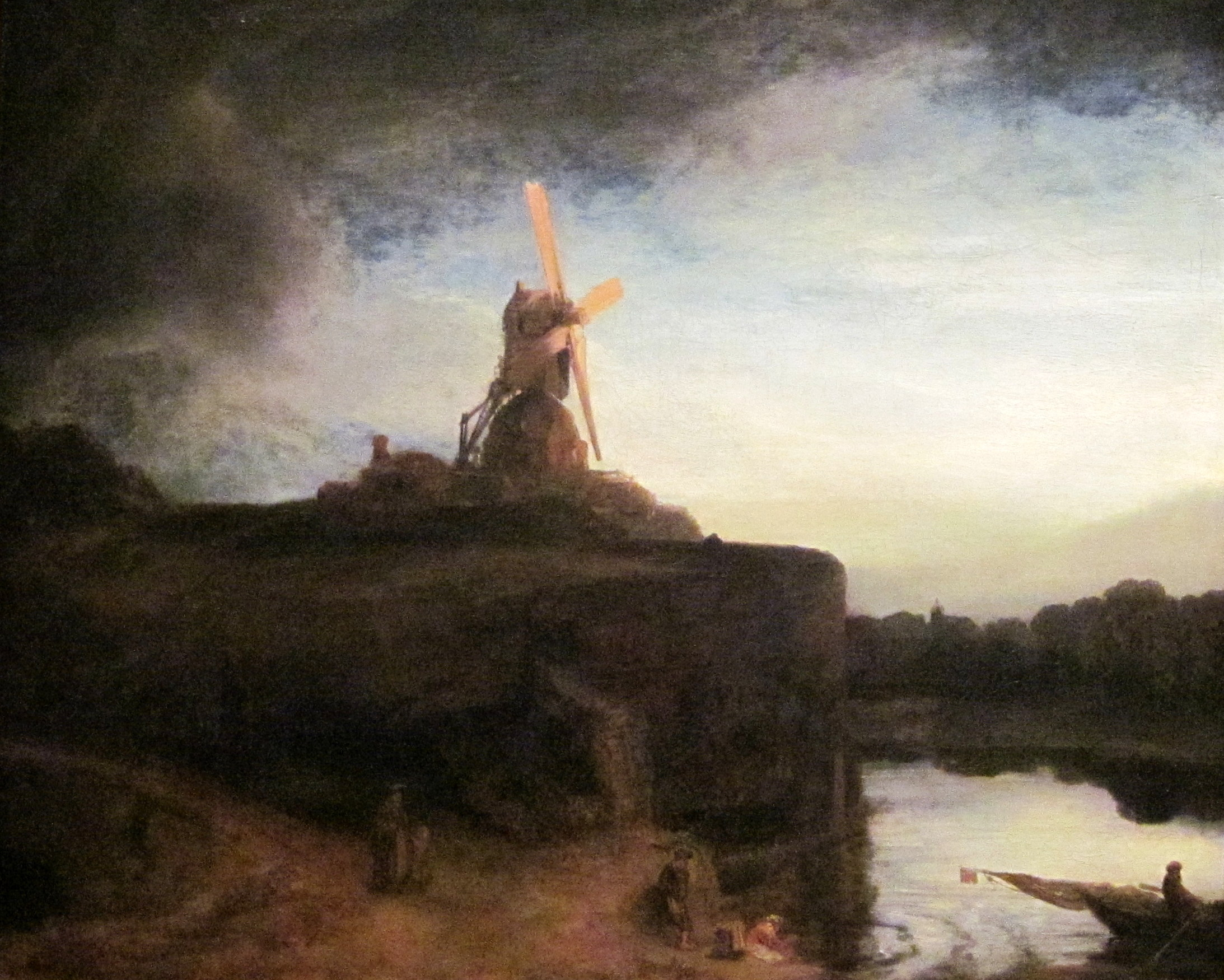
- Artist: Rembrandt Harmenszoon van Rijn
- Year: 1645/48
- Medium: Oil on canvas
- Dimensions: 87.6 cm × 105.6 cm (34.5 in × 41.6 in)
- Location: National Gallery of Art, Washington DC

The Mill is a painting by Dutch baroque artist Rembrandt Harmenszoon van Rijn. It is in the permanent collection of the National Gallery of Art in Washington, DC. For a long time, the attribution to Rembrandt was regarded as doubtful; it has been restored in recent years, although it is not universally accepted. The painting was formerly in the Orleans Collection. It was once owned by Peter Arrell Brown Widener.

This painting was documented by Cornelis Hofstede de Groot in 1915, who wrote:

952. LANDSCAPE WITH A WINDMILL [commonly called, The Mill]. Sm. 601; Bode 142; Dut. 452; Wb. 211; B.-HdG. 345. Beside a broad moat, high above the circular scarp of a ruined bastion, stands a windmill with some low cottages. The path from the mill leads, on the left, over a little bridge across a sluice, to a landing-post in the foreground. A woman with a child goes down to the water; a man pushes a barrow upwards. In the centre foreground a woman at the water's edge is washing linen. A man behind watches her. From the right approaches a ferry-boat with the mast down, rowed by a man. To the right on the farther bank, amid dense groves of trees, are some cows, and beyond them a cottage. Evening light. The last rays of the sun illumine the right half of the sky and envelop the mill in their radiant glow. Painted about 1650. Canvas, 34 inches by 41 inches.

A copy on panel, 34 1/2 inches by 39 1/2 inches was exhibited at the Grafton Gallery, London, 1911, No. 67 [by T. Humphry Ward]. Etched by Mathieu, Dequevauviller, Turner, P. J. Arendzen. Mentioned by Bode, pp. 493, 579; Dutuit, p. 46; Michel, pp. 367, 555 [282 -3, 433]; Waagen, iii. 157. Exhibited at the British Institution, London, 1815, No. 37, and 1864, No. 112; at the Royal Academy Winter Exhibition, London, 1878, No. 172; 1888, No. 74; and 1899, No. 40.

Sale. Duc d'Orléans, 1798 (£525, W. Smith); see Buchanan, i. 196. In the collection of the Marquess of Lansdowne, Bowood, before 1836 (who is said by Sm. to have paid £840 for it); sold to P. A. B. Widener in 1911 (for £100,000). In the collection of P. A. B. Widener, Philadelphia.

The painting features a tonal arrangement in which the upraised vane of the windmill is light against a dark sky. The one opposite it is dark against light. The other two are subordinated: the one pointing toward the viewer is dark against dark, while the far one is light against light. Each vane of the windmill represents one of the four possible tonal arrangements.

== See also ==
- List of paintings by Rembrandt
