= William Holl the Elder =

British engraver and political radical

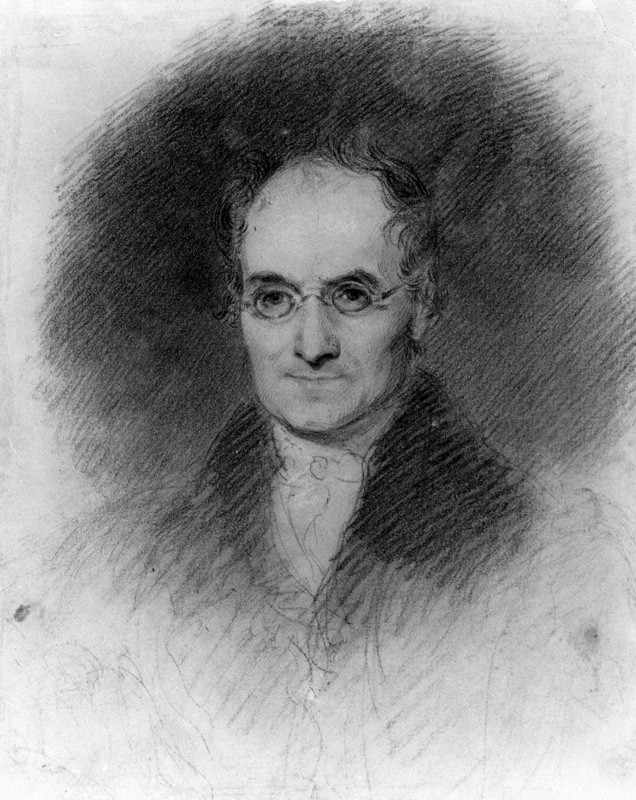
William Holl, drawing c.1830

William Holl the Elder (1771 – 1 December 1838) was a British engraver, who was believed to be of a German background, and a political radical.

== Life ==
Holl was a pupil of Benjamin Smith the engraver, and worked in the stipple method. He was noted as an exponent of "chalk manner" engraving, based on the simulation of chalk lines on paper. While with Smith, he had Thomas Uwins as unwilling pupil.

A progressive in politics, Holl at the time of the Spa Fields riots in December 1816 took the risk of concealing James Watson, son of James Watson (1766–1838) the radical leader, and aiding his departure for the USA. He was a pioneer in using steel plates for banknotes,

Holl lived in Bayham Street, Camden Town. He died in London, 1 December 1838.

== Works ==
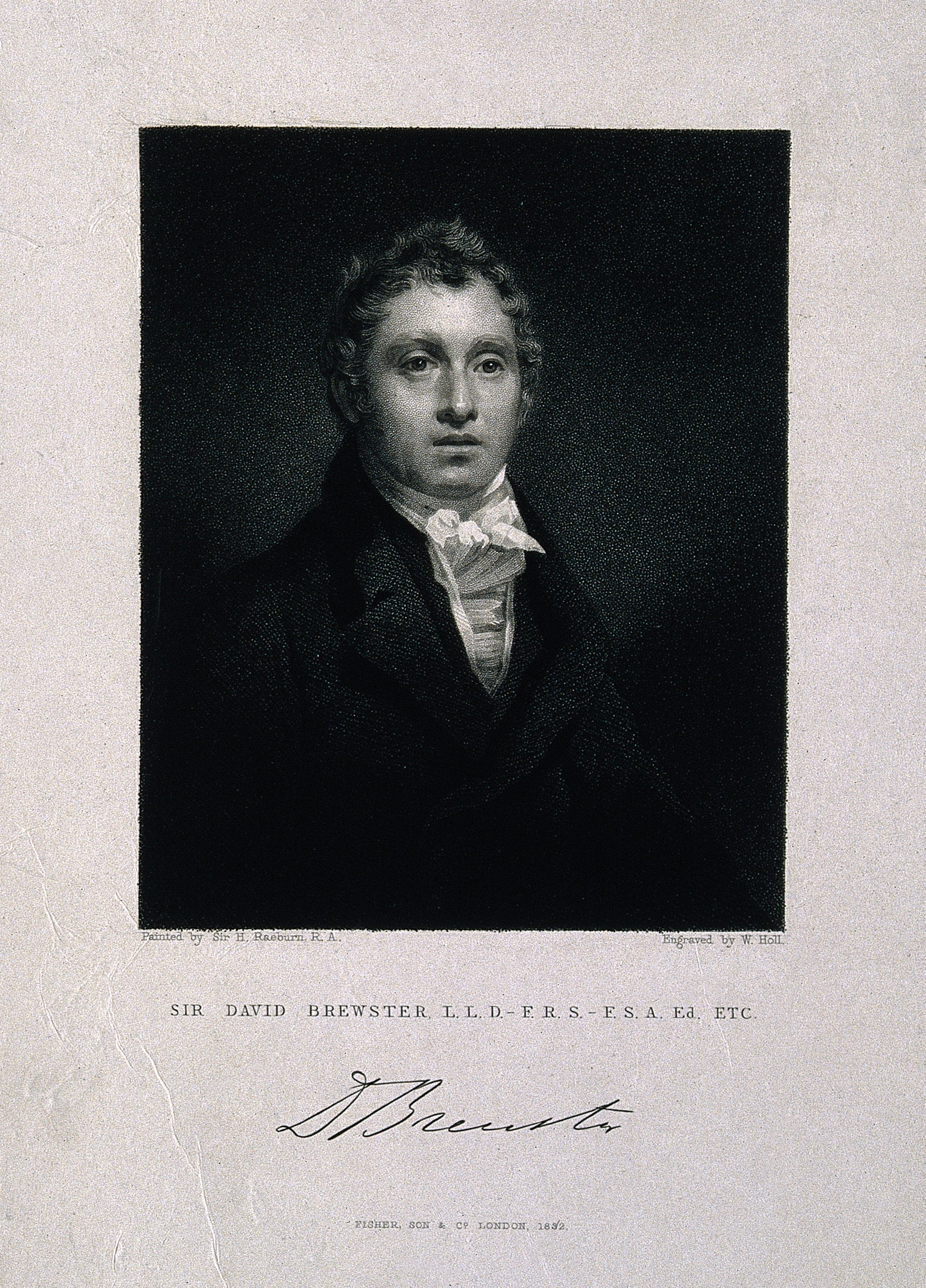
William Holl, engraving of Sir David Brewster after Henry Raeburn

Holl was noted for his numerous engraved portraits, some being for Edmund Lodge's Portraits of Illustrious Personages of Great Britain. He was employed in engraving Henry Corbould's drawings of the antique marbles in the British Museum, and engraved, among other subjects, The Boar which killed Adonis brought before Venus, after Richard Westall. Holl did not push himself forward, and his work often appeared under the name of others.

In the 1820s, Holl was one of the early adopters of the steel plate engraving technique pioneered by Charles Warren; others in the field were William Thomas Fry and Charles Marr.

== Family ==
Holl married Mary Ravenscroft, and they had four sons who followed his trade: Benjamin, who practised engraving for a short time; William; Francis, A.R.A.; and Charles (died 1882), who also practised as an engraver. Another son was Henry Holl the actor.

== Notes ==
Attribution

This article incorporates text from a publication now in the public domain: Lee, Sidney, ed. (1891). "Holl, William". Dictionary of National Biography. Vol. 27. London: Smith, Elder & Co.
