= Arthur Joseph Sulley =

Arthur Joseph Sulley (c. 1853–1930) was a London-based art dealer best known for selling Dutch Old Master paintings, including the record-setting work by Rembrandt The Mill.

Rembrandt, The Mill (1645/1648), now at the National Gallery of Art, Washington, D.C.

== Personal life ==
Sulley was born in c. 1853 in Nottingham, England to Selina Sulley and Joseph Sulley, a jeweler. He was the second-oldest of five children. He married Louisa A. Gordon in 1880 and settled in Hampstead Village, a London suburb. By the time of his death on 30 October 1930, he lived and worked at 54 Grosvenor St. in the center of London.

== Early career ==
Sulley established himself in the art world by working with Thomas McLean on the Haymarket, a street in the City of Westminster, London. He left his partnership there on 30 June 1892. He went on to become a principal for Lawrie & Co., a major London art dealership with a base in Glasgow. He also worked extensively with P. & D. Colnaghi & Co. and Thomas Agnew & Sons (both based out of London), M. Knoedler & Co. in New York, and Galerie Sedelmeyer of Paris. In 1895 and 1896, he traveled in the United States. At the time, most of the American purchases of Dutch Old Master paintings went through Lawrie & Co. and Sulley found a role to play in this market. He worked with several American collectors and industrialists, including Alexander Byers, Peter Arrell Browne Widener, and Henry Clay Frick.

On behalf of Knoedler, Sulley first reached out to Frick in the summer of 1897, about an Anthony van Dyck painting of a “Grimaldi child.” The exact painting is unclear. Van Dyck painted only one pair of children's portraits—of Elena Grimaldi's children, Filippo and Maddalena (also known as “Clelia”)—but Knoedler did not acquire its stake in the two works until 1907 and sold them to Peter Widener in 1908.

On 30 October 1899 Knoedler contacted Sulley about selling a Frans Hals piece to Frick. And two years later, Sulley helped to sell Johannes Vermeer’s Girl Interrupted at Her Music, which Knoedler and Lawrie co-owned, to Frick for $26,000. In 1902, Knoedler & Co. agent Charles Carstairs sold a Meindert Hobbema painting (jointly owned by Lawrie) to Frick. Carstairs wrote about the sale to Sulley: “[I]t is also a good thing to get Mr. Frick in the habit of buying these expensive things.” .”

In 1906, Knoedler sold Frans Hals’ Portrait of a Painter which Sulley had supplied (not to be confused with Portrait of a Man [Michiel de Wael], which Knoedler's also acquired from Sulley), to Frick.

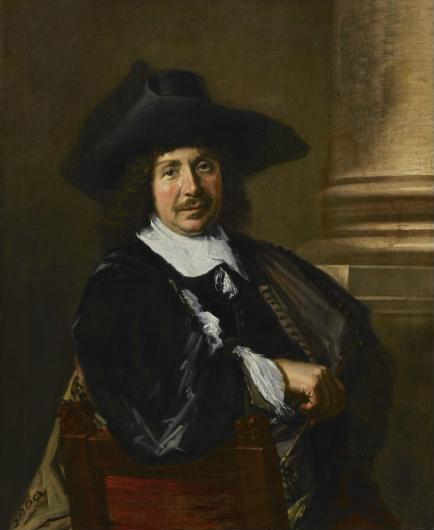
Frans Hals, Portrait of a Painter (1650s), now at the Frick Collection, New York.

Inge Reist notes that the Knoedler stock books fail to mention Sulley's handling of the picture and suggests that Frick may have appreciated the painting because of “the mistaken notion that it was [Hals’] self-portrait.” Other grand sales took place during the same period: in 1900, Sulley arranged the $55,000 sale of a Rembrandt van Rijn self-portrait to Herbert Terrell. The Lawrie & Co. partnership—which comprised William Duff Lawrie, John Mackillop Brown, and Sullley—dissolved on 31 October 1904. Sulley had some of his greatest coups after 1905 when he founded his own art dealership A.J. Sulley & Co.(which was also listed in a directory of booksellers), with Brown – especially in sales of Vermeer works, which were increasingly popular among Gilded Age collectors. Sulley had retained Johannes Vermeer’s Mistress and Maid from the dissolution of Lawrie & Co. and, in 1906 sold the painting to James Simon for $88,000. (The painting did not stay with Simon for long. In 1914, Frick offered to buy Mistress and Maid through Sulley from Simon for $250,000. Simon initially refused, but five years later, he sold the painting to Frick through Abraham Preyer.)

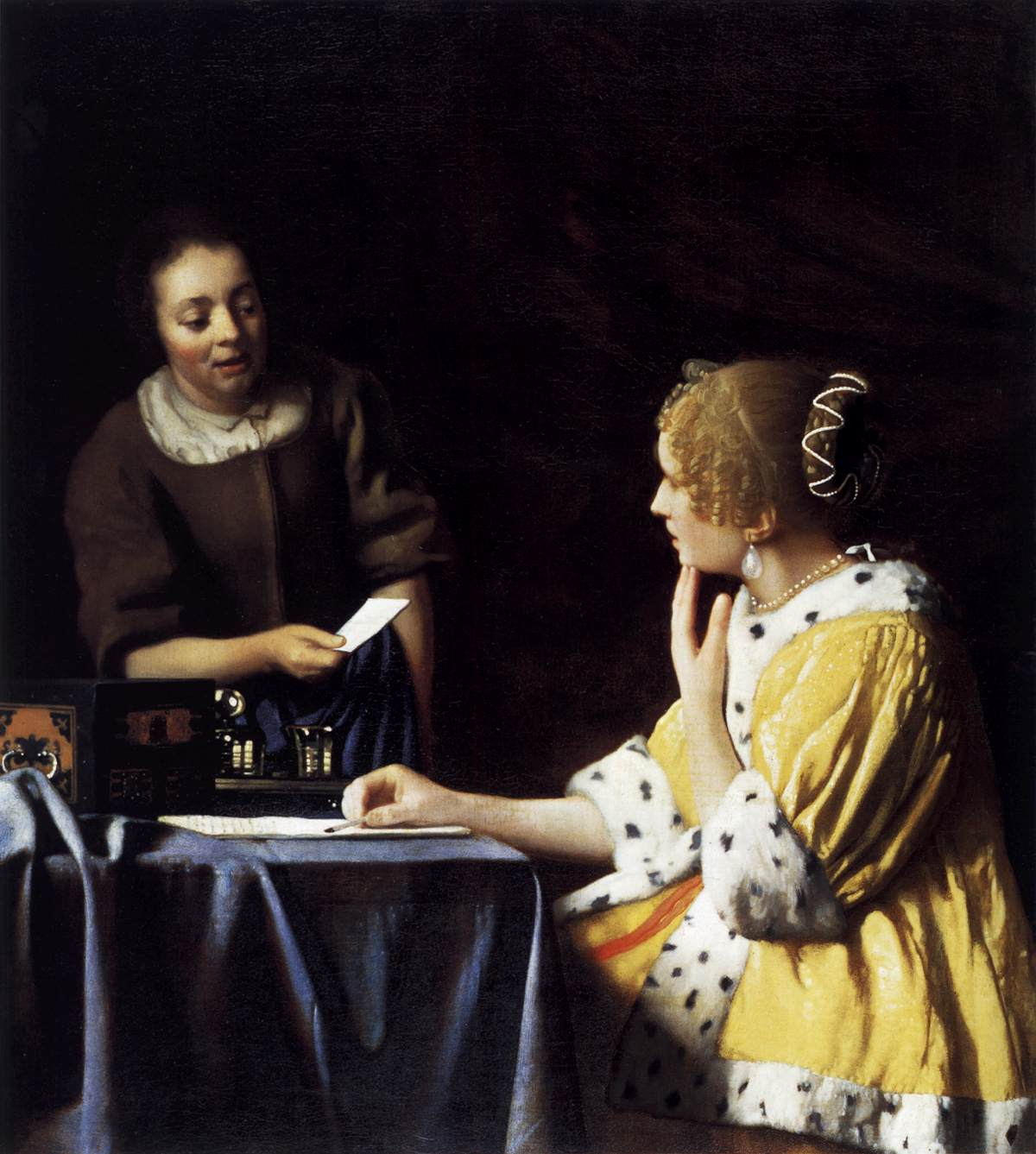
Johannes Vermeer, Mistress and Maid (c. 1667), now at The Frick Collection, New York.

In 1911, Sulley acquired an interest in 33 paintings from the collection of Mrs. Samuel S. Joseph—one of which was Vermeer’s Officer and Laughing Girl. Carstairs arranged the sale of this Vermeer work to Frick for $225,000.

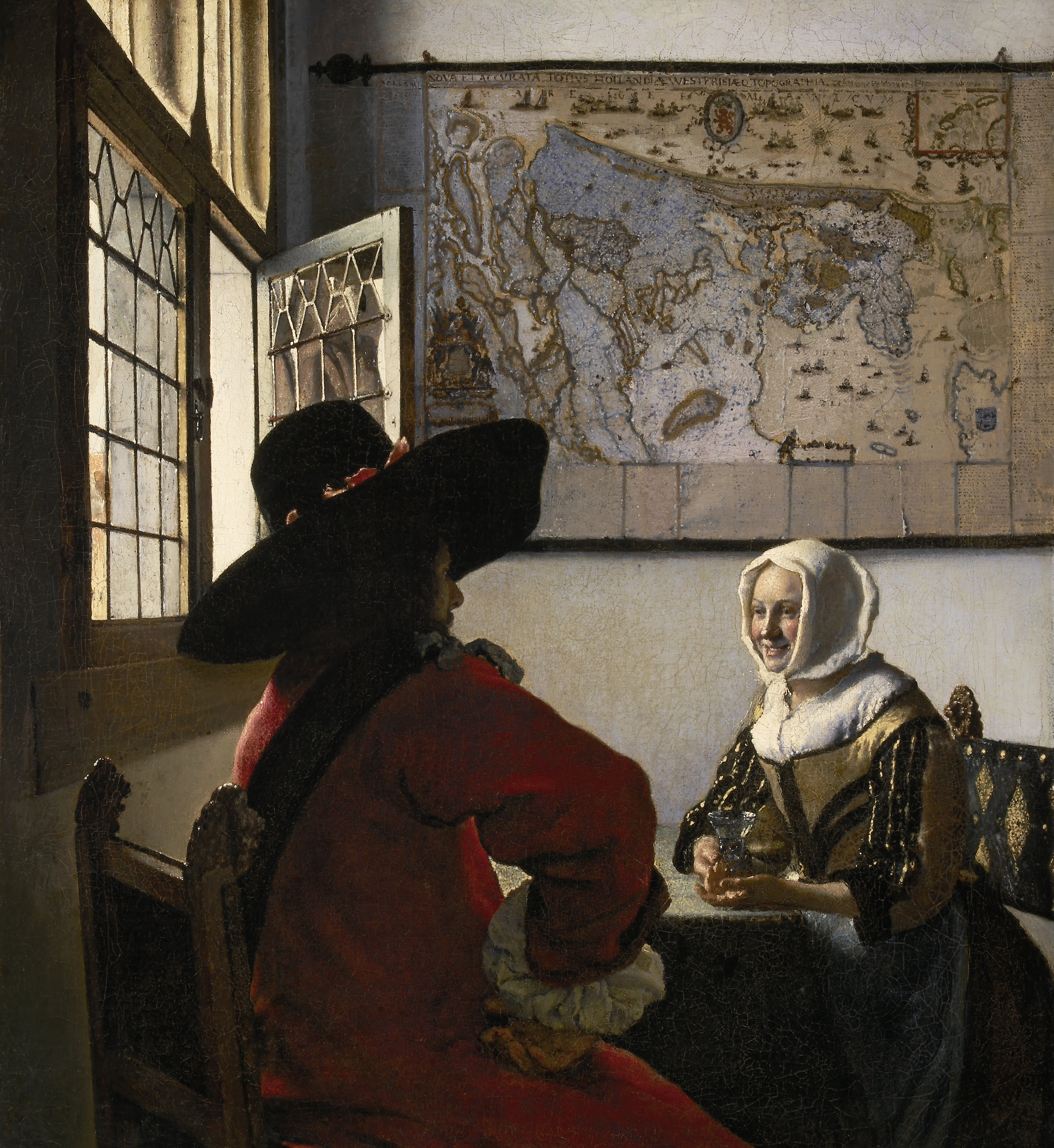
Johannes Vermeer, Officer and Laughing Girl (1657), now at The Frick Collection, New York.

Sulley made history in the same year, 1911, by selling Rembrandt’s The Mill, which the Berlin art luminary and museum director Wilhelm von Bode, called “the greatest picture in the world,” to Peter Widener for £100,000. This painting, which Sulley had taken from Henry Petty-Fitzmaurice, 5th Marquess of Lansdowne for Widener to buy, set a record price for a painting.

== World War I and the 1920s ==
Through World War I and 1920s, Sulley continued his work in masterpieces. In 1914, with the help of connoisseur Bernard Berenson, he sold Lorenzo di Credi’s Boy in a Scarlet Cap and Bernardo Daddi’s Madonna and Child with a Goldfinch to Isabella Stewart Gardner, for $25,000 and $7,000 respectively. He kept Giovanni Bellini’s The Feast of the Gods in his London gallery during World War I air raids and, in 1921, he and Thomas Agnew & Sons sold it under the name The Bacchanal to Joseph Widener.

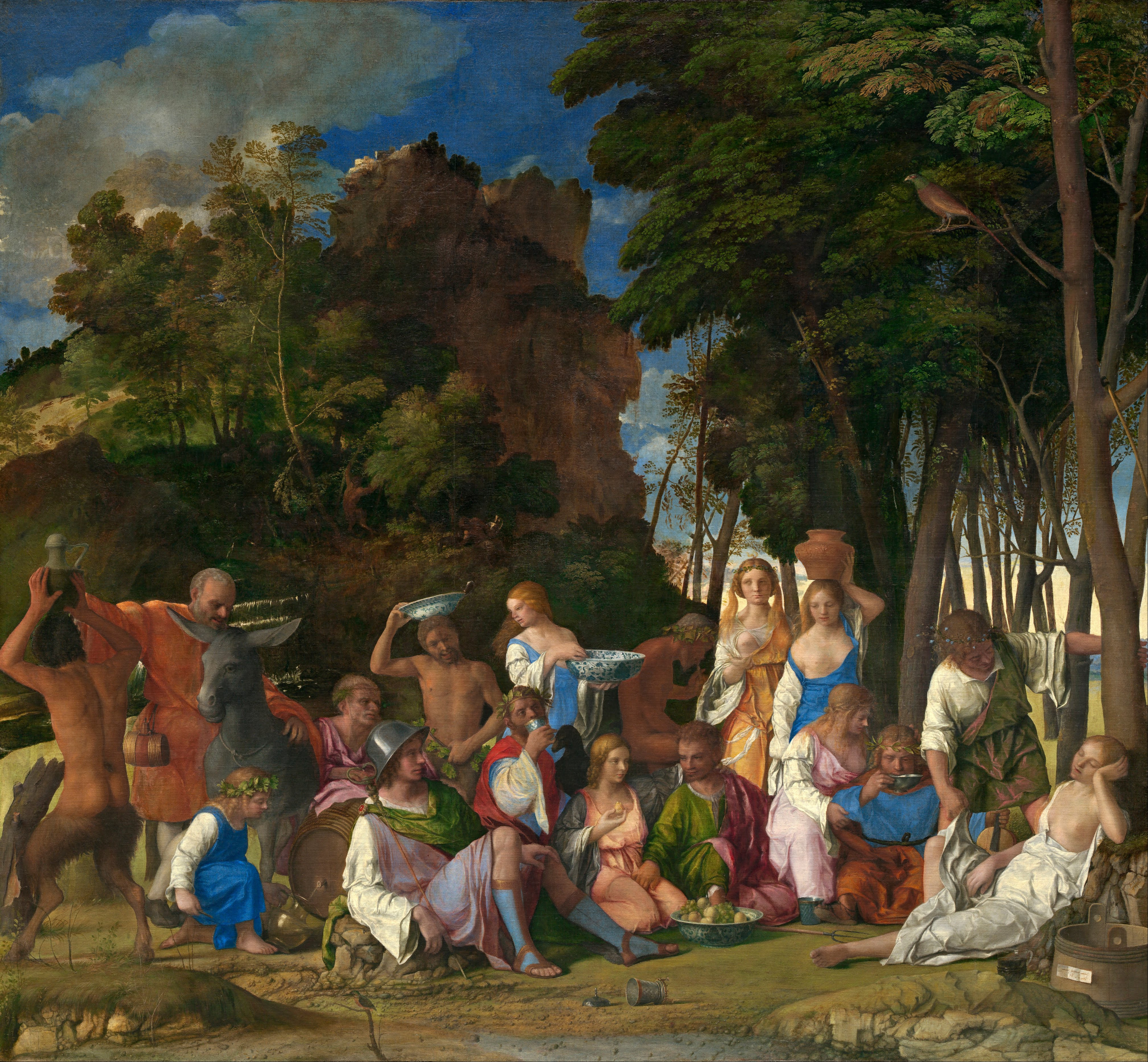
Giovanni Bellini and Titian, The Feast of the Gods (c.1514/1529), now at the National Gallery of Art, Washington, D.C.

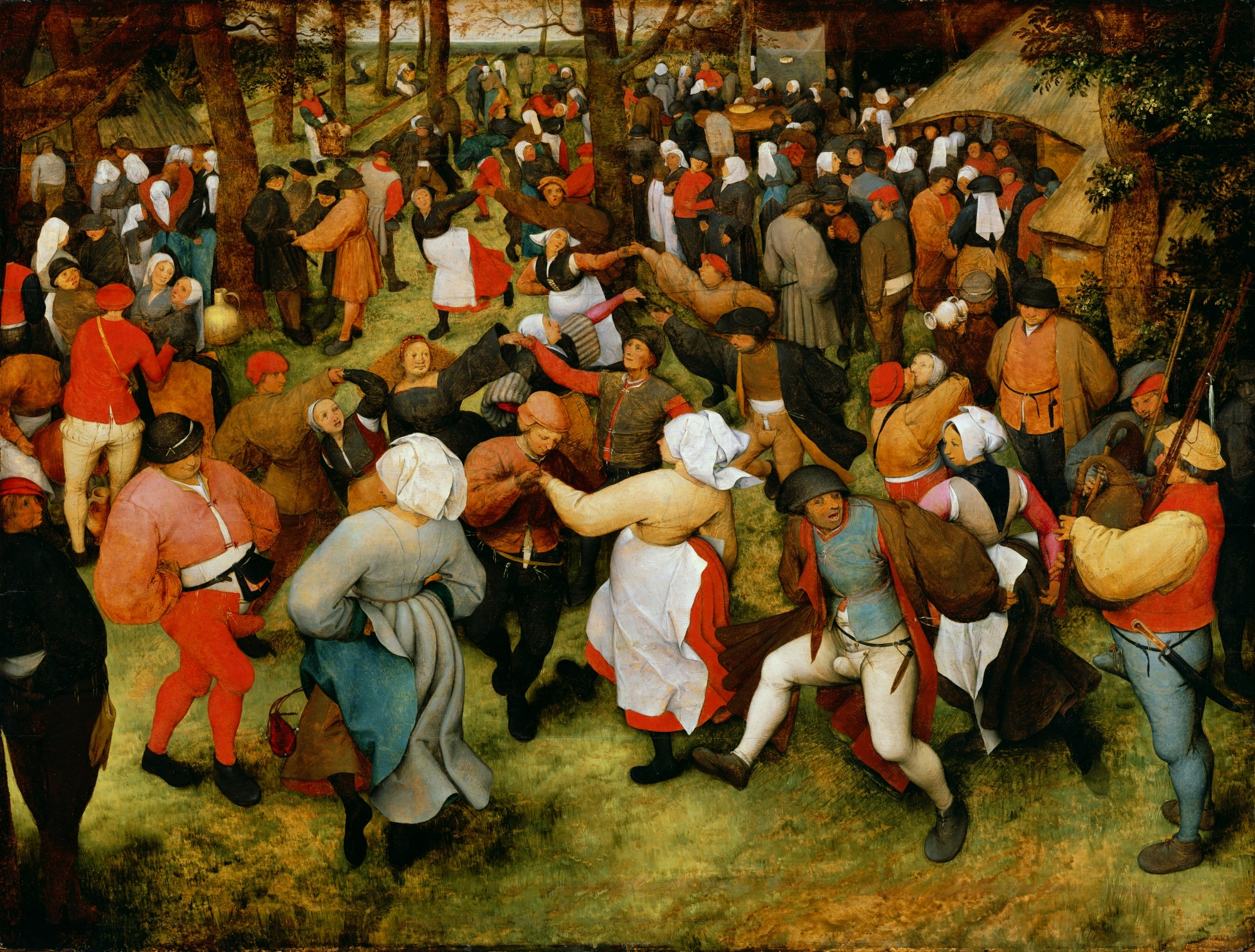
Pieter Brueghel the Elder, The Wedding Dance (c. 1566), now at the Detroit Institute of Arts.

In 1919, he sold Frans Hals’ Adriaen von Ostade and, around the same time, Hals’ Portrait of a Gentleman in White, both to Andrew Mellon. In November 1921, Sulley and Brown dissolved their partnership. Sulley alone continued to head Sulley & Co., working from his house at 54 Grosvenor St., London.

== The Widener/Yusupov Sale ==
Sulley tried to buy Rembrandt's Portrait of a Gentleman with Tall Hat and Gloves and Portrait of a Lady with an Ostrich-Feather for Peter Widener from Russian Prince Felix Yusupov, using the same buyer seduction that he had used on the Marquess of Lansdowne to obtain The Mill. The Prince, however, would not part with them. A sale went through only after World War I and the Russian Revolution, when Prince Felix Yusupov's son, Felix Felixovitch (famous for participating in the murder of Grigori Rasputin), was living in exile in London. In 1921, Sulley arranged for Joseph Widener, who was Peter Widener's son, to buy the works for £100,000. Widener promised the Prince, who had used the paintings as collateral for a debt, that he could repurchase them in three years at 8 percent interest if his financial situation had improved. Another collector, Calouste Gulbenkian, later offered Yusupov £200,000 to renege on the deal and sue to repossess the paintings, but their lawsuit failed. Widener kept the works until he donated them to the National Gallery in Washington, D.C.

Because of this affair, Sulley gained notoriety in the United States. He testified in relation to the 1925 Yusupov-Gulbenkian suit that the Prince's cronies had tried to claim money for the sale before signing a contract or handing over the paintings. The New York Times wrote up Sulley's story with the title "Friends of Prince Grabbed for Cash." The paper also quoted expert witnesses, including Stevenson C. Scott and Colin, saying that $100,000 was a fair price for the two Rembrandt works – particularly during the art market depression of 1921. Former New York governor Nathan L. Miller counseled Widener in the suit, which made it to the New York Supreme Court.

== Late career ==
Back in 1913, Sulley had sold Carlo Crivelli’s Pietà to Wilhelm Valentiner for the Metropolitan Museum of New York. And at the very end of his career, in 1930, Sulley sold another famous item to Valentiner: Pieter Bruegel the Elder’s The Wedding Dance, this time for the Detroit Institute of Arts.

Sulley kept a low profile later in life, sometimes buying works at auction under the name “Hopkins.” Nonetheless, by the end of his career, he had won "widely-shared" respect as a man of "incomparable fairness." Upon his death in 1930, an obituary in Art News lauded his half-century of work in the art world
