= List of listed buildings in Anwoth, Dumfries and Galloway =

This is a list of listed buildings in the parish of Anwoth in Dumfries and Galloway, Scotland.

== List ==
Name	Location	Date Listed	Grid Ref. (Note: Sometimes known as OSGB36, the grid reference (where provided) is based on the British national grid reference system used by the Ordnance Survey. • "Guide to National Grid". Ordnance Survey. • "Get-a-map". Ordnance Survey.)	Geo-coordinates	Notes	LB Number (Note: Historic Environment Scotland assign a unique alphanumeric identifier to each designated site in Scotland, for listed buildings this always begins with "LB", for example "LB12345".)	Image
Rusco Tower				54°55′06″N 4°12′38″W	Category A	3299	Upload another image See more images
Cardonness Estate, Sandyknowes				54°51′14″N 4°14′13″W	Category B	3305	Upload Photo
Anwoth Schoolhouse				54°53′22″N 4°12′43″W	Category C(S)	3297	Upload another image See more images
Cardonness Estate, Cardonness East (Main) Lodge, Gates And Gatepiers				54°51′36″N 4°13′48″W	Category B	3306	Upload Photo
Rusco House				54°54′06″N 4°12′03″W	Category C(S)	3300	Upload Photo
Rutherford's Monument				54°52′38″N 4°12′11″W	Category B	3295	Upload another image See more images
Ardwall House				54°52′02″N 4°12′44″W	Category A	3302	Upload another image See more images
Anwoth Old Church Churchyard, excluding Scheduled Monument No 2340 ‘Anwoth Old Church, Cross Slab and Gordon Tomb’, Anwoth				54°52′50″N 4°12′38″W	Category A	3309	Upload another image See more images
Fleet Bay, Cardoness Chapel				54°51′18″N 4°13′52″W	Category C(S)	3438	Upload Photo
Anwoth Parish Church, (Church Of Scotland)				54°52′41″N 4°12′41″W	Category B	3296	Upload another image See more images
Boreland Of Anwoth				54°52′17″N 4°12′26″W	Category B	3303	Upload Photo
Cardonness Estate, West Lodge				54°51′31″N 4°13′56″W	Category C(S)	3307	Upload another image
Kirkclaugh				54°50′42″N 4°17′21″W	Category B	3298	Upload Photo
Cardonness Estate, Laundry Cottage				54°51′11″N 4°14′23″W	Category B	3304	Upload Photo

== Key ==
The scheme for classifying buildings in Scotland is:

- Category A: "buildings of national or international importance, either architectural or historic; or fine, little-altered examples of some particular period, style or building type."
- Category B: "buildings of regional or more than local importance; or major examples of some particular period, style or building type, which may have been altered."
- Category C: "buildings of local importance; lesser examples of any period, style, or building type, as originally constructed or moderately altered; and simple traditional buildings which group well with other listed buildings."

In March 2016 there were 47,288 listed buildings in Scotland. Of these, 8% were Category A, and 50% were Category B, with the remaining 42% being Category C.

== See also ==
- List of listed buildings in Dumfries and Galloway
