= Rusco Tower =

Early 16th-century tower house in Scotland

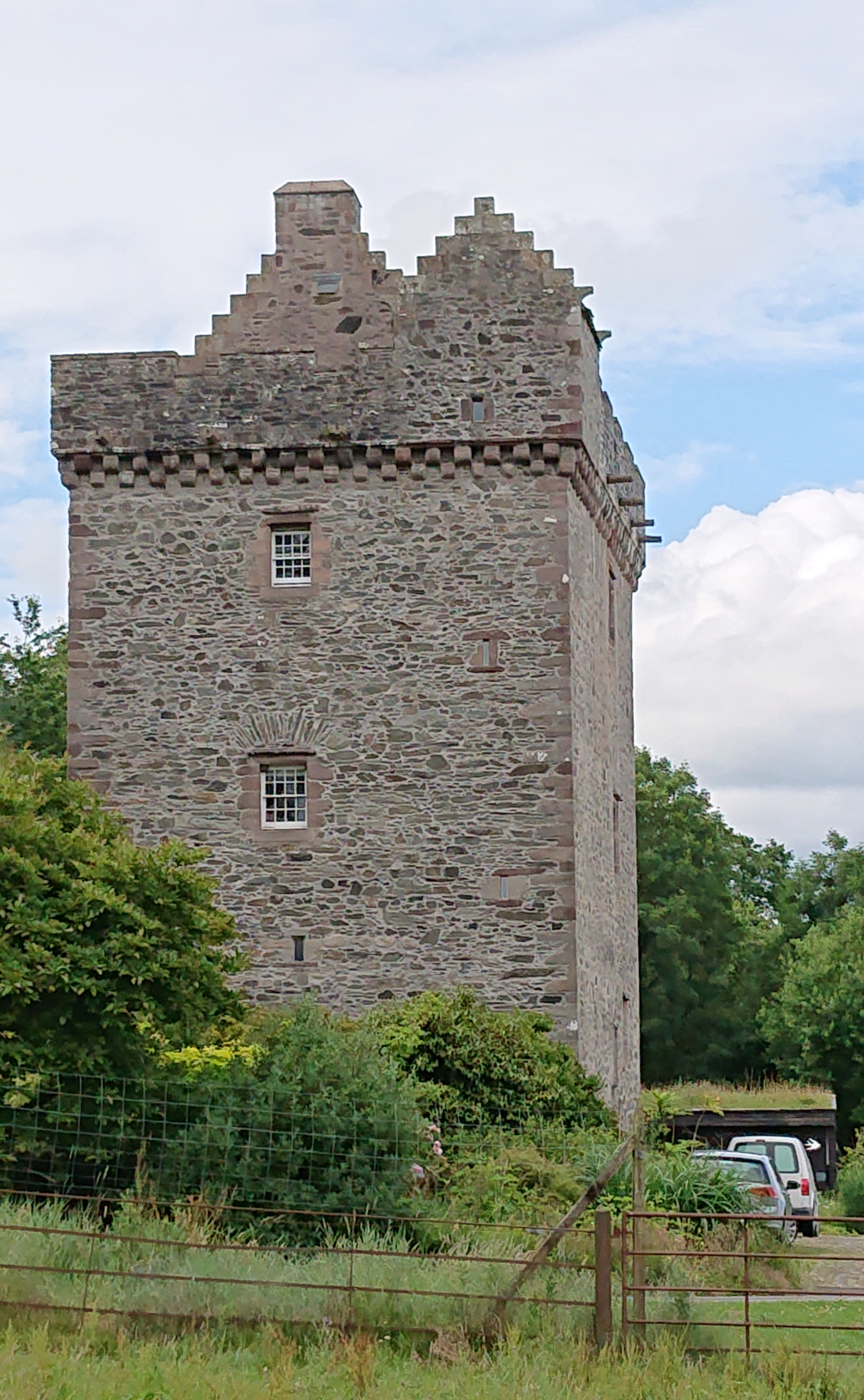

- Location of the tower within Dumfries and Galloway
- 54°55′06″N 4°12′38″W
- Type: Tower house
- Location: Near Gatehouse of Fleet, Dumfries and Galloway

History
- Built: Circa 1500
- Built for: Mariota Carson and Robert Gordon

Site notes
- Restored by: Graham Carson

Listed Building – Category A
- Designated: 1971
- Reference no.: LB3299

Rusco Tower, sometimes called Rusco Castle, is a tower house near Gatehouse of Fleet in Dumfries and Galloway, Scotland. Built around 1500 for Mariota Carson and her husband Robert Gordon, on lands given to them by her father, it was used to incarcerate a number of the Gordons' rivals in the 16th century. After Robert Gordon died and Carson remarried, their eldest son James Gordon seized the tower and imprisoned his mother, fearing that she would make it over to her new husband, Thomas Maclellan of Bombie. Gordon went on to kill Maclellan on the High Street in Edinburgh, while a court case intended to settle the matter was ongoing.

The Gordons sold the tower in the 17th century, and it was inhabited continuously until the late 19th or early 20th century. By the middle of the 20th century, the building was uninhabited and had fallen into a state of disrepair. In 1971 it was designated a Category A listed building, and was shortly afterwards purchased and renovated by Graham Carson, a Scottish businessman, who went on to live in it from 1979 until 2006. Carson attempted to discover whether his family was related to the Carsons who originally owned the estate, but was unable to document a connection. It remains in the Carson family, and is still used as a domestic dwelling.

The tower was the subject of a poem, "Rusco Castle, a Tale of the Olden Time", published in 1841.

== Name ==
The building's name is recorded by Historic Environment Scotland as Rusco Tower, but some authors refer to it as Rusco Castle, and it is sometimes spelled Rusko. In 1515, when a charter was signed at the tower, its name was recorded as "Ruschen", and it appears in records of 1575 as "Ruschew".

== Description ==
Rusco Tower is located about 5 kilometres (3 mi) north of Gatehouse of Fleet, on a wooded hillside looking down into the valley of the Water of Fleet. It is a rectangular tower house, four storeys high including its attic, with a wall walk inside its parapet. Its overall design is very similar to that of nearby Cardoness Castle, on a slightly smaller scale, and it is possible that it was constructed by the same builder.

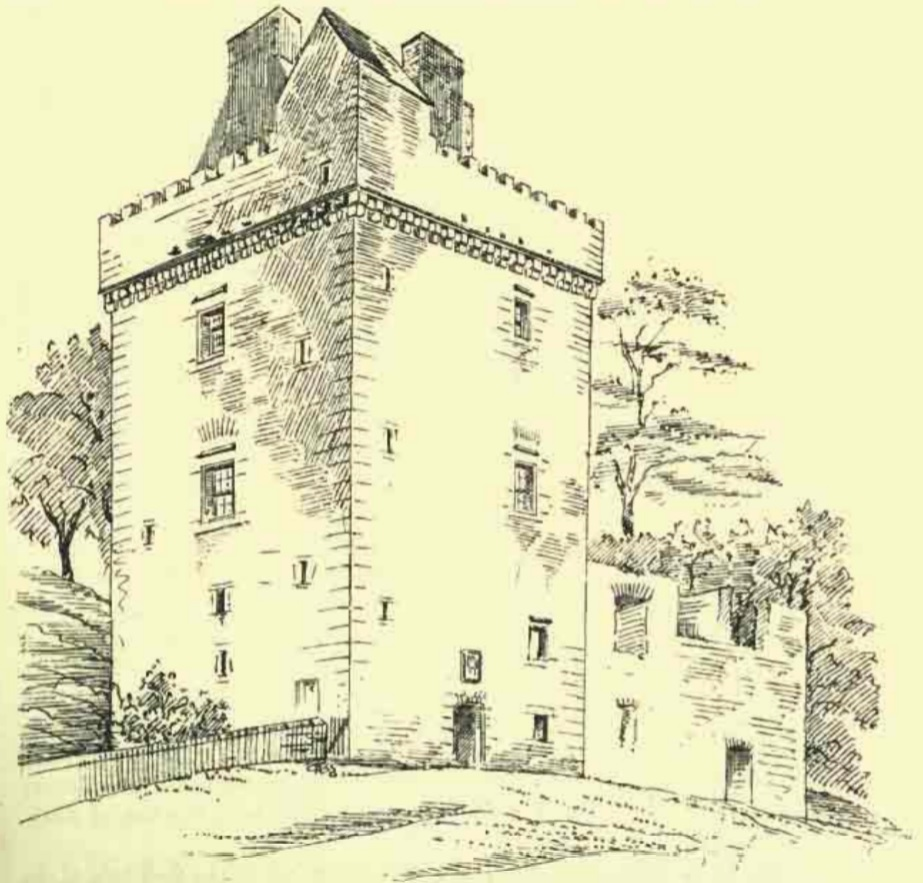
A view of the tower from the south east, published in 1889.

=== Exterior ===
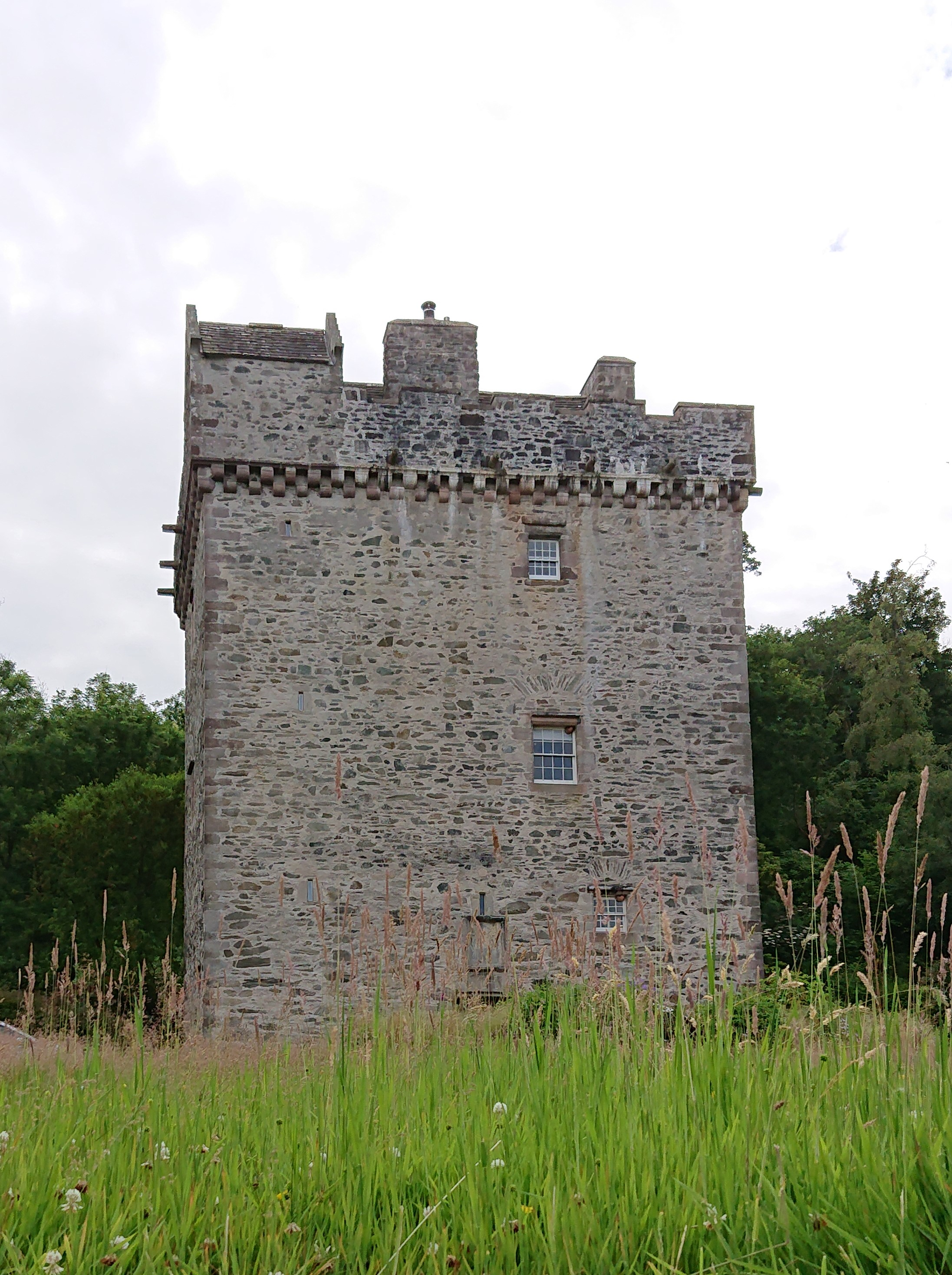
The tower's east elevation.

The external footprint of the tower is rectangular, roughly 11.8 metres (39 ft) by 8.8 metres (29 ft), and it is about 15 metres (49 ft) high. Stone water spouts project from the roof, cannon-shaped to the east frontage, and U-shaped on the other sides. Within the parapet, which is crenellated and supported by chequered corbels, there is a garret, and in the south east corner is a cap-house: a small attic covering the stairway and opening onto the wall walk.

The chamfered windows are small and irregularly placed, and corniced on the upper floors; their projecting lintels, unusual in Scotland, seem to have been intended to cast off rain. In the west and east faces, the ground floor walls are pierced by gunloops, shaped like inverted keyholes, in a style similar to that of Cardoness. The main entrance, on the ground floor of the north wall, has a broad segmental arch, and was formerly a doorway into a (now demolished) 17th-century extension; the less elaborate original entrance remains, in the centre of the east front. Above it is a worn heraldic plaque with two shields: the upper one, supported by a pair of unicorns, bears the Royal Arms of Scotland, while the lower shield shows a quartered coat of arms, probably for Gordon and Carson, although only a G is still discernible.

On the north side of the building, the lower sections of the west and north walls of a 17th-century extension survive. This was already dilapidated by the 19th century, and most of it has since been demolished.

=== Interior ===
The tower is noted for its unusual sophistication in the arrangement of small rooms built into the thickness of its walls, which are up to 2.4 metres (7.9 ft) thick in places. Also built into the thickness of the walls is a turnpike stair with a newel, which ascends the full height of the tower. The ground floor, which has an entresol level, is vaulted, and is divided into a number of store rooms and guard rooms, some with gun loops, and one with a trap door dropping down to a windowless dungeon. The entresol is tunnel vaulted, and occupied by a single room with windows in the south and east walls. It is likely that the ground floor was originally used to accommodate horses or cattle, with the entresol providing a sleeping place for servants.

Taking up most of the first floor is the great hall, 7.8 metres (25.6 ft) by 5 metres (16.4 ft) in size, with a beamed ceiling supported by corbels projecting from the walls, and arched windows. One of the stone seats in the west window serves as a step up to a concealed door. This gives access to a small room, again built into the thickness of the wall, which has an external window and also a laird's lug (Scots language for lord's ear): a small listening hole into the hall.

The second floor and the attic, which would each originally have been occupied by single large rooms, have been subdivided.

== History ==
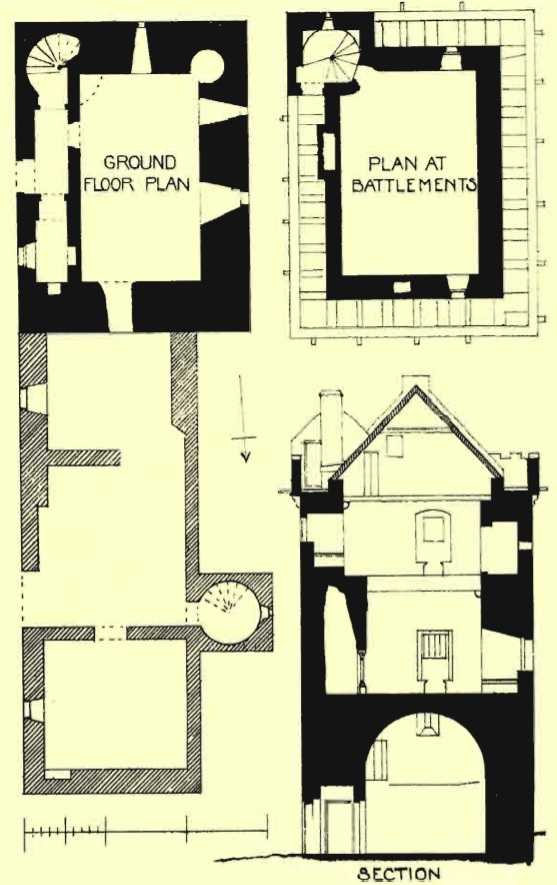
19th-century plans and sections of the tower, still showing the 17th-century extension

=== Construction ===
The tower was built between 1494 and 1504 for Mariota Carson (or Acarsane) and her husband, Robert Gordon, within the Glenskyreburn estate that had been gifted to them by her father, John Carson. Gordon, heir to the Lochinvar estate, took on the designation "of Rusco" after its completion, and is sometimes referred to by his wife's surname in records. He was brought before the Lords of Council in 1501 or 1502, charged with the destruction of a house on Crown lands within the barony of Kirkandrews in order to remove timber and slates, possibly to be used for the construction of Rusco Tower; he claimed that the house belonged to him, but was unable to prove it, and was ordered to pay 1,000 merks in damages.

=== 16th century ===
Gordon was forced to leave Rusco soon after it had been constructed. With his brother Alexander, he was implicated in the murder of John Dunbar of Mochrum around 1503, and while his brother fled the country, Gordon was put to the horn, a form of punishment similar to outlawry, and his possessions were confiscated; his estate was let by the crown to a neighbour. In 1507, while still under the horn, Gordon was given permission to travel to France, and in 1511 he was given a pardon for his part in the crime, and allowed to return to Scotland and take up his estate once more. By 1516, he had been knighted.

Rusco Tower was used to incarcerate a number of people in the 16th century. Gordon seized and imprisoned Janet Porter, an heiress who had recently married John McCulloch, a lesser member of the Cardoness McCulloch family. Gordon attempted to force her to sign over her inheritance, the Blacket estate, to him instead of her new husband, and McCulloch, who was not powerful enough to recapture his wife by force, applied to the courts. Gordon did not appear at the hearing, but in his absence the court ordered him to return Porter to her husband. It is not clear whether the order was obeyed, but records show that the Gordon family came to own the Blacket estate shortly afterwards.

Gordon spent several years in litigation with the Agnews of Lochnaw, who were related to him by marriage. In 1523 he sought to bring the legal dispute to an end by abducting Andrew Agnew, the heir of Lochnaw and his own grandson, and imprisoning him at Rusco. When the boy's uncle, Matthew Agnew, demanded that he be returned within three days, Gordon claimed that he had been placed in a school in Dumfries. The records do not show how this affair was concluded.

Rusco Castle, a Tale of the Olden Time

But lo! a little ruined tower,
Erected by forgotten hands,
Though once the abode of pride and power,
That by the river's margin stands—
Of old the Lords of Lochinvar
Here dwelt in peace, but armed for war;
And Rusco Castle could declare
That valiant chief and lady fair
Had often wooed and wedded there.
Upon the eastern bank of Fleet,
Castramont smiles—a hamlet sweet
Just fronting Rusco Tower,
Of peace and war two emblems meet—
None fairer than the first we meet,
The other seems a dark retreat
Where savage passions lower.

Robert Gordon died in 1524, and within a year his wife Mariota Carson married Thomas Maclellan of Bombie. Since she owned Rusco Tower and its lands in her own right following the death of her husband, there would have been nothing to prevent her from leaving them to her new husband's family upon her death; her eldest son, James Gordon of Lochinvar, was so concerned that this might happen that he seized Rusco, where his mother was still living, and had her transported to the Borders and imprisoned. Her husband appealed to the courts, but before the case was concluded Maclellan was killed, in broad daylight, by Gordon and his retinue on the High Street in Edinburgh.

=== Later history ===
The later history of the tower was less turbulent. It was of minor importance to the Gordons once they had taken possession of Lochinvar, and was mostly used as accommodation for minor family members. It was sold in the 17th century, around which time a two-storey extension was added to the north side. It was described in the poem "Rusco Castle, a Tale of the Olden Time" published in 1841 by Dugald Williamson of Tongland.

The tower was lived in until the late 19th or early 20th century, but was abandoned and allowed to fall into ruin between the First and Second World Wars.

In 1971, Rusco Tower was designated a Category A listed building. The following year, it was purchased by Graham Carson, a Scottish businessman, who employed the architect W. Murray Jack to restore it to an inhabitable condition. The work was completed in 1979, and Carson moved into the tower with his family. Carson had a great-grandfather who was born in Wigtownshire, close to Rusco, and he attempted to find any connection between his family and the Carsons who had originally built the tower, but was never able to do so. He lived in the tower until 2006, when he moved out and his son, Ian, took up residence; as of 2018, Ian Carson was still living at Rusco Tower.

== See also ==
- Restoration of castles in Scotland

== Sources ==
- "Galloway Members' Group Newsletter" (PDF). National Trust for Scotland.
- Gifford, John (1996). The Buildings of Scotland:Dumfries and Galloway. London: Penguin. ISBN 0140-71067-1.
- "Graham Carson". The Herald. Herald and Times Group. 22 November 2012.
- Historic Environment Scotland. "Rusco Tower (Category A Listed Building LB3299)".
- Hume, John R (2000). Dumfries and Galloway: An Illustrated Architectural Guide. Edinburgh: The Rutland Press. ISBN 1-873-190-344.
- Lindsay, Maurice (1986). The Castles of Scotland. London: Constable. ISBN 0-09-473430-5.
- MacGibbon, David; Ross, Thomas (1889). The Castellated and Domestic Architecture of Scotland, from the Twelfth to the Eighteenth Century: Volume III (PDF). Edinburgh: David Douglas. OCLC 1110962732.
- McLachlan Harper, Malcolm (1876). Rambles in Galloway: Topographical, Historical, Traditional and Biographical. Edinburgh: Edmonston and Douglas. OCLC 894541889.
- "Obituary: Graham Carson; Entrepreneur and Community Champion who Designed a Tartan and Rebuilt a Castle". The Scotsman. JPI Media Publishing Ltd. 23 November 2012.
- Reid, R. C. (1947). "Rusco Castle" (PDF). Transactions and Journal of Proceedings of the Dumfriesshire and Galloway Natural History and Antiquarian Society. 24: 27–35. OCLC 650280267.
- "Rusko Castle". Canmore. Historic Environment Scotland.
