= Rutherford's Monument =

Monument near Anwoth, Scotland

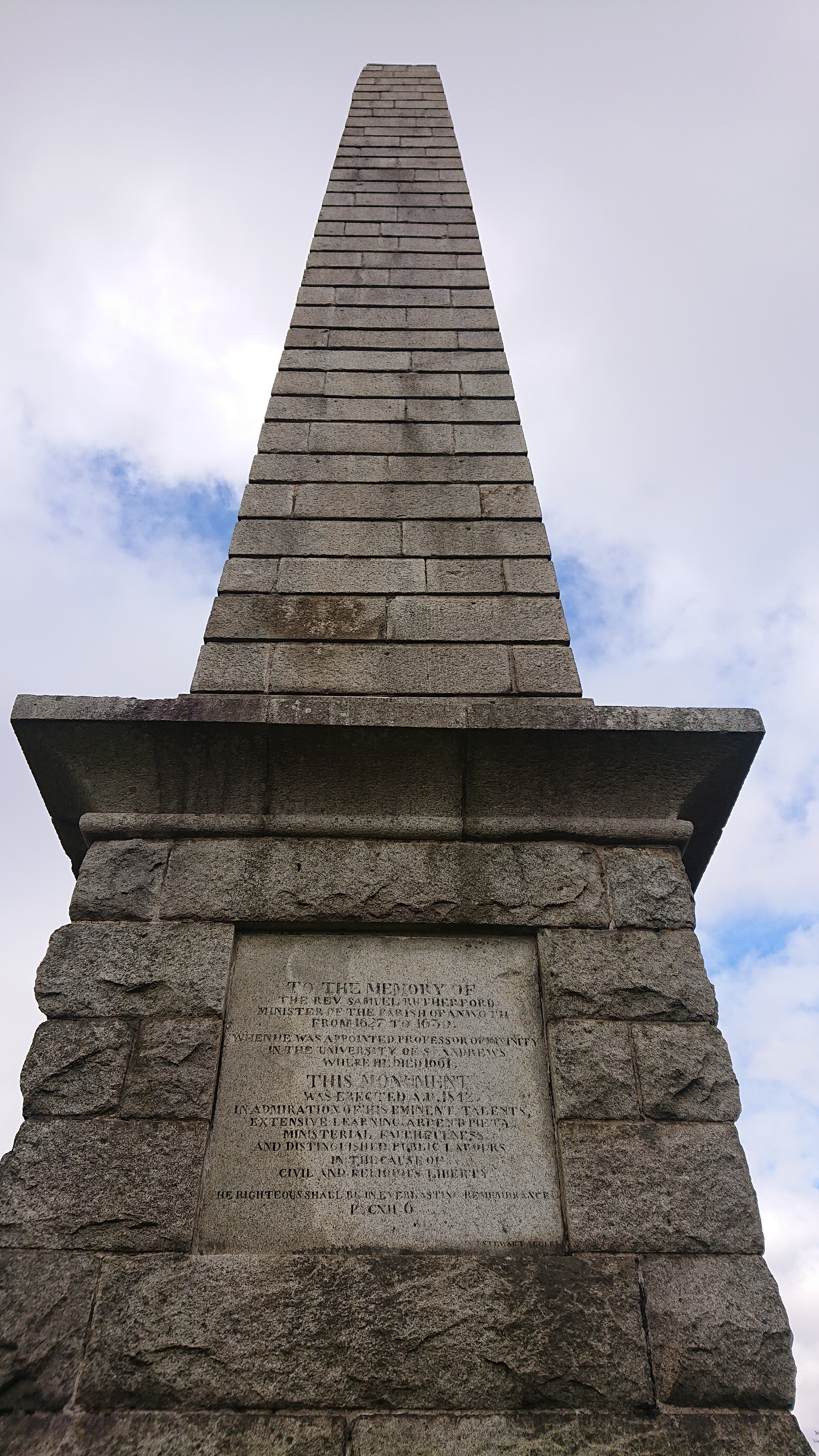
- Rutherford's Monument
- 54°52′37.7″N 04°12′10.4″W
- Location: Boreland Hill, between Anwoth and Gatehouse of Fleet
- Height: 56 feet (17 m)
- Beginning date: 1842
- Restored date: 1851, 2018
- Dedicated to: Samuel Rutherford

Rutherford's Monument is a commemorative monument between Anwoth and Gatehouse of Fleet in Dumfries and Galloway, Scotland. It is dedicated to the 17th-century theologian Samuel Rutherford, who had been minister at the nearby Anwoth Old Church. It was built in 1842, and takes the form of a granite obelisk atop a square base. It was badly damaged by lightning in 1847, and rebuilt in 1851. It is a Category B listed building.

== Description ==
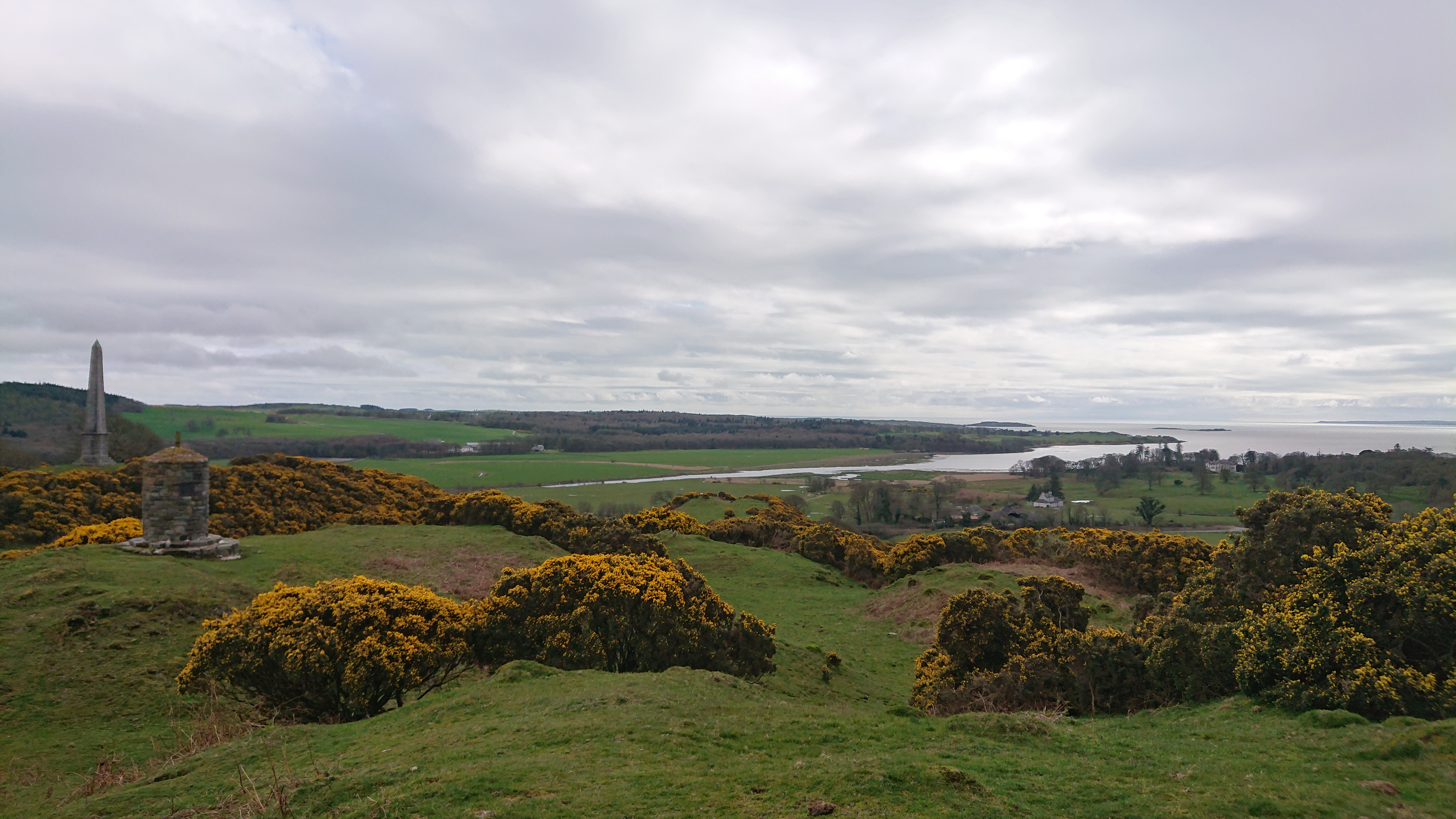
The Rutherford Monument and the Millennium Monument, looking south west towards Wigtown Bay

The monument stands on Boreland Hill, between Anwoth and Gatehouse of Fleet. It is an obelisk, 56 feet (17 m) high, made of polished granite and mounted upon a square, corniced base. On its south face, it bears an inscription commemorating Samuel Rutherford, which reads:

To the memory of the Rev. Samuel Rutherford Minister of the parish of Anwoth from 1627 to 1639 when he was appointed Professor of Divinity in the University of St Andrews where he died 1661. This monument was erected A.D. 1842 in admiration of his eminent talents, extensive learning, ardent piety, ministerial faithfulness and distinguished public labours in the cause of civil and religious liberty. The righteous shall be in everlasting remembrance PsCXII-6

On its north face is another inscription, recording its restoration after being hit by lightning:

Struck by lightening AD MDCCCXLVII Rebuilt AD MDCCCLI

A short distance to the north-east of the Rutherford Monument is another, smaller monument, known as the Millennium Monument, erected in the year 2000 and commemorating all of the ministers of parishes of Anwoth and Girthon since the reformation.

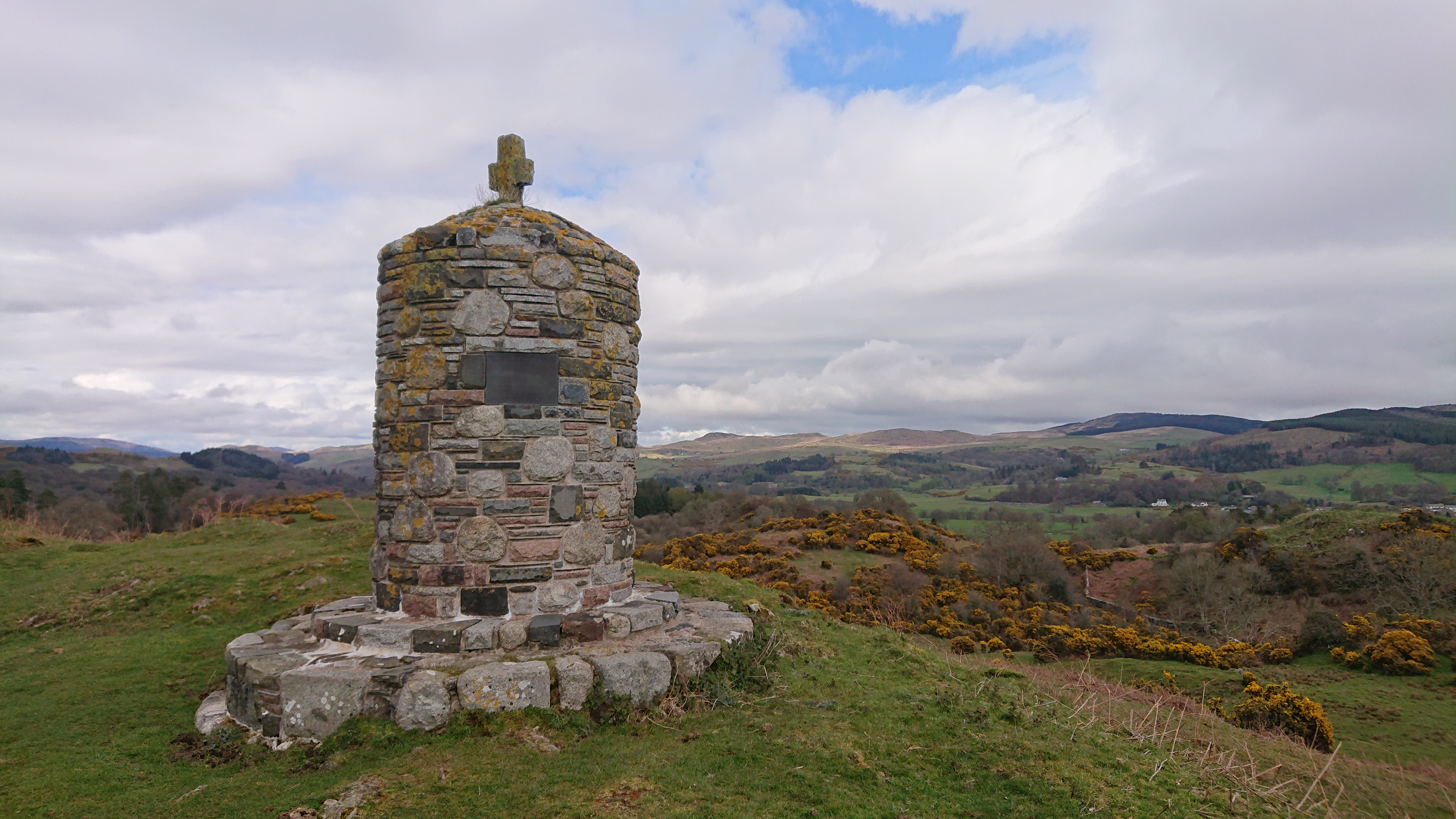
The nearby Millennium Monument

== History ==
In 1838, a campaign was initiated to raise funds to construct a monument to Samuel Rutherford, who had been minister at Anwoth Old Church in the seventeenth century. By 1842 enough money had been raised, and the structure was built by the mason John Stewart and his firm J & J Stewart. It was struck by lightning in 1847 and largely destroyed; fundraising began again to restore it, and by 1851 there was sufficient money to engage Robert Hume, a lighthouse builder, to implement the repairs.

In 1971, the monument was designated a Category B listed building.

By the early twenty-first century, the uppermost layers of stone had become loose, and it was feared that the structure might collapse. In 2016 fundraising began once again to restore the structure, and work was carried out in 2017 and 2018 to stabilise it.

== Sources ==
- "Anwoth, Rutherford's Monument". Canmore.
- Historic Environment Scotland. "Rutherford's Monument (Category B Listed Building) (LB3295)".
- Norris, Stephen (27 June 2018). "Restoration work under way on Rutherford Monument at Gatehouse of Fleet". The Daily Record. Scottish Daily Record and Sunday Mail Ltd.
- Gifford, John (1996). The Buildings of Scotland:Dumfries and Galloway. London: Penguin. ISBN 0140-71067-1.
- Hume, John R (2000). Dumfries and Galloway: An Illustrated Architectural Guide. Edinburgh: The Rutland Press. ISBN 1-873-190-344.
- "Rutherford Monument". Gatehouse of Fleet.
- Conduit, Brian; Taylor, Hugh; Martin, Felicity (2021). Dumfries and Galloway: Outstanding Circular Walks. Bath: Trotman Publishing. ISBN 978-0-319-09118-0.
