= River Fleet (disambiguation) =

River Fleet or River fleet may refer to

- River Fleet, a subterranean river of London
- River Fleet (Sutherlandshire), in northern Scotland, which begins in Lairg, runs through Strath Fleet, flowing into Loch Fleet
- Water of Fleet, in southern Scotland
- patrol boats, or ships or boats which patrol a river; cf. navy
