= Maculloch baronets =

Extinct baronetcy in the Baronetage of Nova Scotia

The McCulloch Baronetcy, of Myretoun, was a title in the Baronetage of Nova Scotia. It was created by Charles I on 10 August 1664, for Alexander McCulloch. The title became extinct upon the death of the third Baronet in 1704.

== MCCulloch baronets, of Myretoun (1664) ==
- Sir Alexander McCulloch, 1st Baronet (died 1675)
- Sir Godfrey McCulloch, 2nd Baronet (died 1697)
- Sir Gilbert McCulloch, 3rd Baronet (died 1704, without issue)
