= Catherwood Learmonth =

British legal administrator

Catherwood Craig Learmonth FRSE (26 October 1896 – 20 October 1981) was a British legal administrator who served as Chamberlain to the Merchant Company of Edinburgh.

== Life ==
He was born on 26 October 1896 in Gatehouse of Fleet, in Kirkcudbrightshire, the son of William Learmonth (1860–1938), a schoolmaster, and his wife, Katherine (or Kathleen) Macauslan Craig. They lived at Hill Cottage on The Cut in Gatehouse. Around 1905 they moved to Laurel Bank (77 High Street) in Gatehouse. He had one older brother, James Rognvald Learmonth.

Early in the First World War (September 1914) he volunteered for the Lowland Field Ambulance attached to the RAMC. He was later attached to the Royal Scots Fusiliers, serving in Egypt, Gallipoli, and Bulgaria. He was commissioned as a 2nd Lieutenant in 1917.

In 1943 he was elected a Fellow of the Royal Society of Edinburgh. His proposers were James Watt, John Alison, William Annan and Peter Comrie.

He died on 20 October 1981 and is buried in Bowmore churchyard on the island of Islay in Scotland.

== Family ==
He married twice. His first wife was Grace Christian Gray. They had two sons, Catherwood William Cuthbertson and James Michael Learmonth. He secondly married Camilla Edie von Woukon les Crabowiec (Baroness Wokoun).
