= Fleetside Rovers F.C. =

Former association football club in Scotland

Fleetside Rovers
- Nickname(s): Fleetside Rovers F.C.
- Founded: 1901
- Dissolved: 1913
- Ground: Standingstone Park
- President: W. Crosbie
- Hon. Secretary: John Halliday
1903–09 colours	1909–14 colours

Fleetside Rovers F.C. was an association football club from Gatehouse of Fleet, Kirkcudbrightshire, active just before the First World War.

== History ==
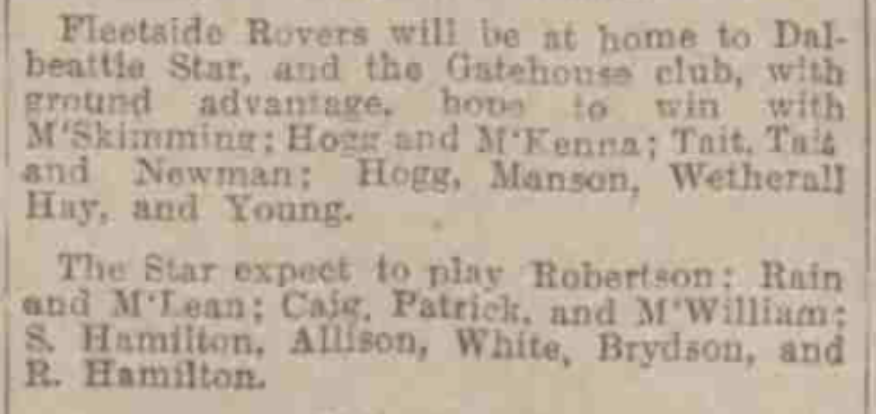
1910–11 Potts Cup, Fleetside Rovers v Dalbeattie Star line-ups, Scottish Referee, 18 November 1910

The first match recorded for the club was a 6–2 defeat at St Cuthbert's Wanderers in September 1901.

Its first competitive football came in the Law Cup, for senior clubs in Kirkcudbrightshire and Wigtownshire, in 1901–02, its first game in the competition being a defeat at Barholm Rovers a month before it joined the Scottish Football Association. The club continued entering the competition until the last time it was held, 1906–07, and lost every tie. It did however reach the final of the Wigtownshire & District Cup in 1906–07, losing to Creetown Volunteers; the final was played twice after the Rovers successfully protested against the eligibility of one Arnott, but the Rovers lost both matches 2–0.

From the 1908–09 season, the club started to enter the Southern Counties Cup and the less-prestigious Potts Cup, and again continued its run of losing. The club drew at the 5th K.O.S.B. in the Southern Counties Consolation Cup in 1908–09, but lost the replay, which was affected by such crowd violence against the "incompetent" referee that the Rovers' ground was closed, and the club banned from playing within 5 miles of Gatehouse, for 2 months.

It looked as if the club had finally won a tie when it beat Dalbeattie Star in the first round of the Southern Counties in 1910–11, but the tie was replayed after a protest that J. Clark of the Rovers only was not registered in time for the tie, and Star eventually won through. The club did get revenge in the Potts Cup that year, a 2–0 win over Star, with a goal in each half, being the club's only win in the competition.

The 1910–11 season marked the club's last appearance in the Southern Counties and Potts Cups. It lasted one year longer with entries to the Scottish Qualifying Cup, but, again, other than a 6–6 draw with Stranraer on its debut in the competition in 1902–03, it lost every match it played.

The club made preparations for the 1912–13 season, but barely (if ever) seems to have played, having withdrawn from the Southern Counties association in May 1912. After an 8–3 win over Twynholm to open the 1913–14 season, the club seems to have given up.

== Colours ==
The club wore the following colours:

- 1901–03: black and white
- 1903–09: primrose and pink
- 1909–14: green and white

== Ground ==
The club played at Standingstone Park in Gatehouse, which was notably isolated, being 6 miles from the nearest railway station. The ground may have been the area marked out at the top of Castramont Road, next to the cemetery.
