= Water of Fleet =

River in Scotland

Fleet Valley National Scenic Area
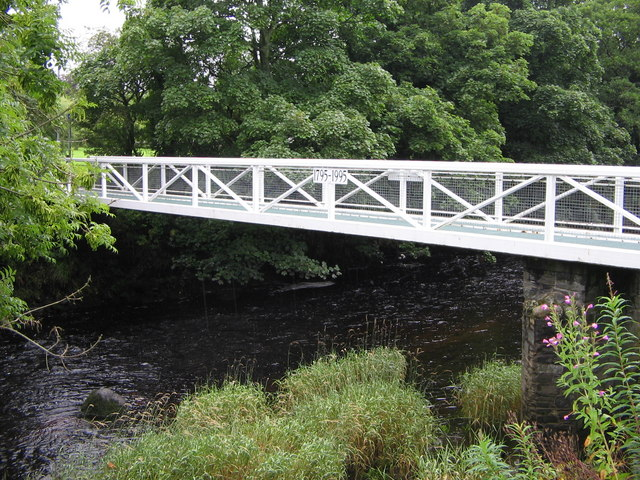
- Footbridge over the Water of Fleet

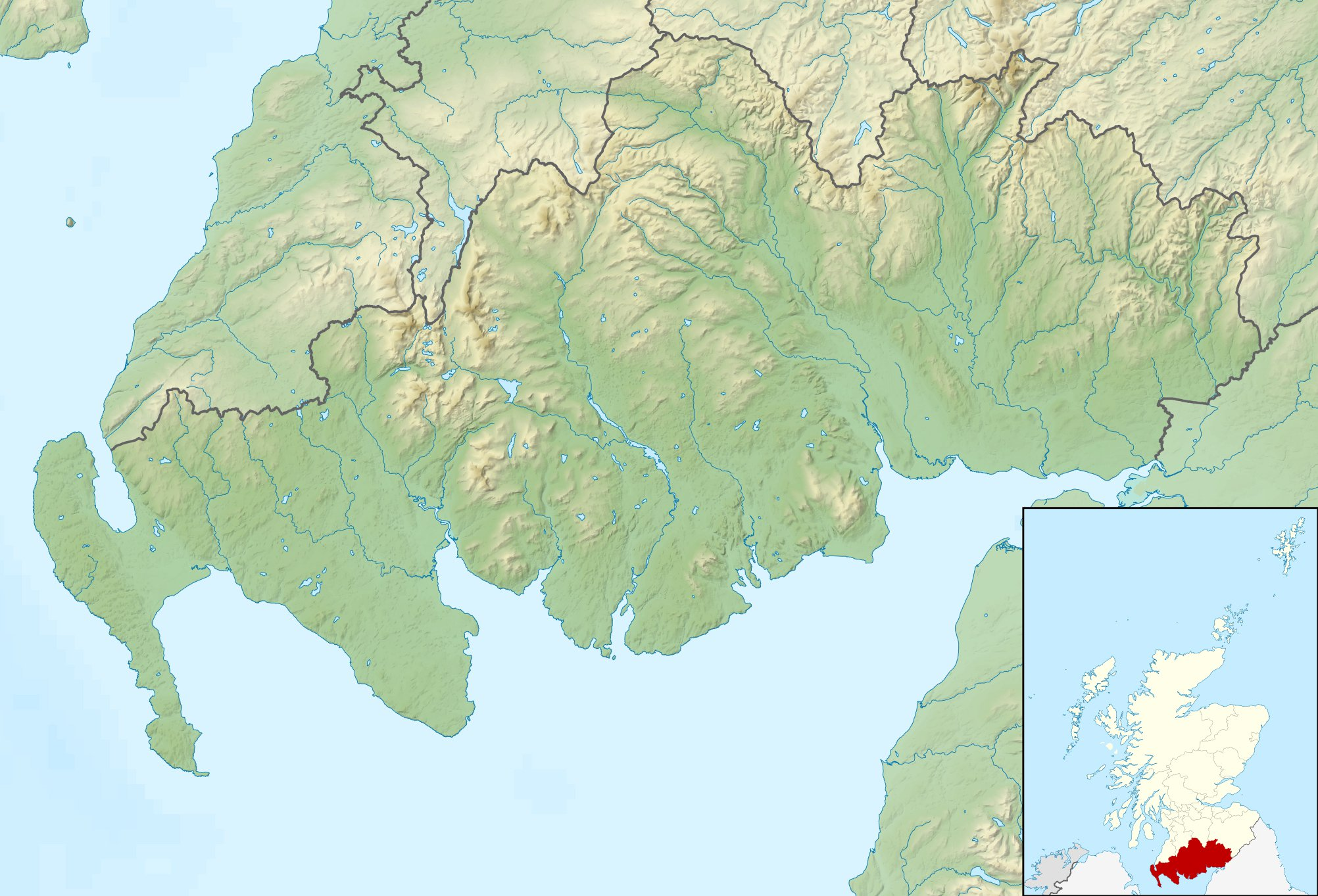
- Location within Dumfries and Galloway
- Location: Dumfries and Galloway, Scotland
- Coordinates: 54°49′N 4°15′W
- Area: 59 km^{2} (23 sq mi)
- Established: 1981
- Governing body: NatureScot

The Water of Fleet is a river in Scotland flowing into Fleet Bay on the Solway Firth. Its two tributaries are the Big Water of Fleet, which begins around Loch Grannoch, and the Little Water of Fleet. The river flows through Gatehouse of Fleet before meeting the sea.

The Water of Fleet rises on the slopes of Cairnsmore of Fleet, a 710 m high hill that is designated as a National Nature Reserve. Lower down, the Fleet Valley contains the best examples of upland oakwood in Kirkcudbrightshire, two of which (Killiegowan Wood and Carstramon Wood) are designated as Special Areas of Conservation.

The lower part of the area surrounding the Water of Fleet is designated as the Fleet Valley National Scenic Area, one of forty such areas in Scotland, which have been defined so as to identify areas of exceptional scenery and to ensure its protection from inappropriate development. The Fleet Valley national scenic area (NSA) covers 5854 ha in total, of which 5373 ha is on land, with a further 481 ha being marine (i.e. below low tide level). The coastal part of the NSA covers the shoreline, islands, foreshore and sea area of Fleet Bay between Barlocco Isle and Ringdoo Point. Inland, the NSA includes the town of Gatehouse of Fleet, and land on both sides of River Fleet for about 10 km northwards. The area represents a microcosm of Scotland, with coastal scenery in the south, and a wilder landscape of hills and moors in the north. In between, there is slow transition through farmland and fields, with an abundance of drystane dykes and open woodland.

The shoreline of Fleet Bay was a favourite location for artists from the Kirkcudbright Artists' Colony.

The Big Water of Fleet is crossed by a twenty span viaduct, which was once a part of the Portpatrick Railway route.

Cardoness Castle is a well-preserved 15th-century tower house just below Gatehouse of Fleet, close to the point at which the river begins to widen towards Fleet Bay. It was originally owned by the MacCullochs of Myreton. They abandoned the castle in the late 17th Century, following the execution of Sir Godfrey McCulloch for the murder of a Clan Gordon neighbour. It is now in the care of Historic Environment Scotland, and is a scheduled monument.

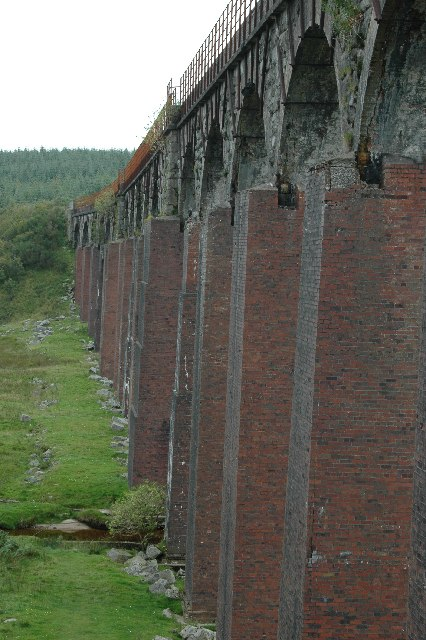
Big Water of Fleet viaduct on the route of the former Portpatrick and Wigtownshire Railway.
