= Godfrey McCulloch =

Scottish politician and murderer

Sir Godfrey McCulloch, 2nd Baronet of Myretoun (c. 1640 – 26 March 1697) was a Scottish politician who was executed for murder.

== Biography ==
In 1678 McCulloch served as a Commissioner for Wigtownshire at the Convention of Estates (Scottish Parliament).

=== Murder and execution ===
In 1684, he shot William Gordon in the leg, partly as a result of a long-standing feud (rising from a land dispute) between his family and the Gordon family. Gordon later died of the infection caused by the wound. McCulloch was found guilty and sentenced to death. Although he initially escaped to France, he was captured when he returned to Edinburgh in 1697 and beheaded at the Mercat Cross. McCulloch had been living in Scotland since 1694 under the alias "Mr. Johnstoune". He was one of the last men to be executed on the Maiden. Following his death, much of his family emigrated to America, and Cardoness Castle, which had been owned by the family since c. 1470, was abandoned.

=== Legend ===
There is also a legend (quoted by Sir Walter Scott, a distant relation) that McCulloch was in fact saved from execution by a gnome whom he had done a favour for earlier in life, and that he was never seen again. Another story tells that after his beheading, his headless body ran 100 yards down the Royal Mile. Given his sensational trial and the number of witnesses present, either story is unlikely at best.

== See also ==
- Clan McCulloch
- McCulloch One Name Study

Baronetage of Nova Scotia
Preceded by Alexander McCulloch	Baronet (of Myretoun); 1675–1697	Extinct
