= Anwoth Parish Church =

Church in Dumfries and Galloway, Scotland

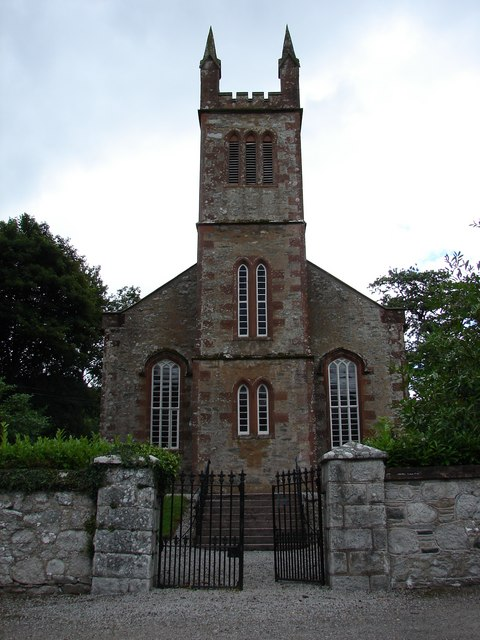
- The west gable and tower
- Anwoth Parish Church
- 54°52′41″N 4°12′41″W
- Location: Anwoth, Dumfries and Galloway
- Country: Scotland
- Denomination: Church of Scotland

History
- Founded: 1626

Architecture
- Functional status: Privately owned events venue
- Heritage designation: Category B listed building
- Designated: 1971

Anwoth Parish Church was built in 1826 to serve the parish of Anwoth in Dumfries and Galloway, Scotland. Designed by Walter Newall, it replaced Anwoth Old Church, which had been the parish church since it was built in 1626 and was partially demolished at the same time as the new church was built.

The church has been designated a Category B listed building.

== History ==
The earliest records of religious activity at Anwoth date back to the 12th century, when the parish was granted to Holyrood Abbey. A cross slab, dating to around 1100, was found in the parish in the late 19th century.

Anwoth Old Church was built on a nearby site in 1626, and in 1627, shortly after receiving his licence to preach the gospel, Samuel Rutherford took up residence as the minister at the invitation of John Gordon of Kenmure; Rutherford remained at the parish until 1636, when his disagreements with the church authorities led to his prohibition from practising as a minister and exile to Aberdeen. The old church remained in use throughout the 17th and 18th centuries, undergoing major improvements in 1710, and it continued to be used until 1826 when the new church was built. The ruins of the old church survive, and are designated a Category A listed building.

Walter Newall provided the designs for the new building, which was built by William and John Robertson and Andrew Mackie. A vestry was added later in the 19th century, and in 1905 a new roof was installed, along with new furniture and a raised gallery by the James Barbour and his partner John McLintock Bowie. Further alterations were made between 1958 and 1959 by Antony Curtiss Wolffe, a refugee with Jewish ancestry who fled Nazi Germany before training as an architect in Edinburgh, and eventually settling in Dumfries and Galloway.

The church was designated a Category B listed building in 1971.

== Description ==
Anwoth Parish Church is of a plain, rectangular Neo-gothic design with a rubble exterior and polished red sandstone detailing. At the west gable is a square tower, built in three sections, separated by string courses. The lower two sections have pairs of lancet windows, and the belfry has a triple lancet, and is topped with battlements and pinnacles. The building has three bays, each with tudor arched windows with timber mullions and elaborate tracery. There is a single storey vestry attached to the east gable, which was built later in the 19th century using similar materials to the main church.

Inside, the king post truss roof installed in 1905 is exposed, and along the west wall there is a raised gallery that was constructed at the same time. Behind the pulpit is a small pipe organ, which was installed in 1924 by the Positive Organ Company. On the east wall is a white marble monument, carved by William Birnie Rhind and dedicated to William Francis John Maxwell who rebuilt the mausoleum in the churchyard of the ruined old church. There is also a war memorial, in the form of a wall-mounted white marble tablet, dedicated to the people from the parish who died in the First and Second World Wars.

== Current usage ==
Anwoth Parish Church ceased being used as a church in 2002. The Church of Scotland sold the building to a private buyer, and it is now used as an events venue.

== Sources ==
- "Antony Curtiss Wolffe". Dictionary of Scottish Architects.
- "Anwoth, Old Kirk, Churchyard And Gordon Tomb". Canmore.
- "Anwoth Parish". War Memorials Register. Imperial War Museum.
- "Anwoth Parish Church". Dictionary of Scottish Architects.
- Gifford, John (1996). The Buildings of Scotland:Dumfries and Galloway. London: Penguin. ISBN 0140-71067-1.
- Historic Environment Scotland. "Anwoth Old Church Churchyard, excluding Scheduled Monument No 2340 'Anwoth Old Church, Cross Slab and Gordon Tomb', Anwoth (Category A Listed Building LB3309)".
- Historic Environment Scotland. "Anwoth Parish Church (Category B Listed Building LB3296)".
- Keating, Helen (9 April 2017). "Jeremy Gott obituary". The Guardian. Guardian News & Media Ltd.
- "Samuel Rutherford – Fair Anwoth by the Solway – 1627 – 1636". Free Presbyterian Church of Scotland.
- "Walter Newall". Dictionary of Scottish Architects.
