= Anwoth =

Coordinates: 54°52′43″N 04°12′42″W

Anwoth is a settlement near the Solway Firth in the historic county of Kirkcudbrightshire, southwest Scotland, within a parish of the same name in the Vale of Fleet, Dumfries and Galloway. Anwoth lies a mile (1.5 km) to the west of Gatehouse of Fleet.

Anwoth's most famous inhabitant was the Rev. Samuel Rutherford (c. 1600 – 1661), who was the minister at Anwoth Old Kirk from 1627 until 1636 when he was banished to Aberdeen.

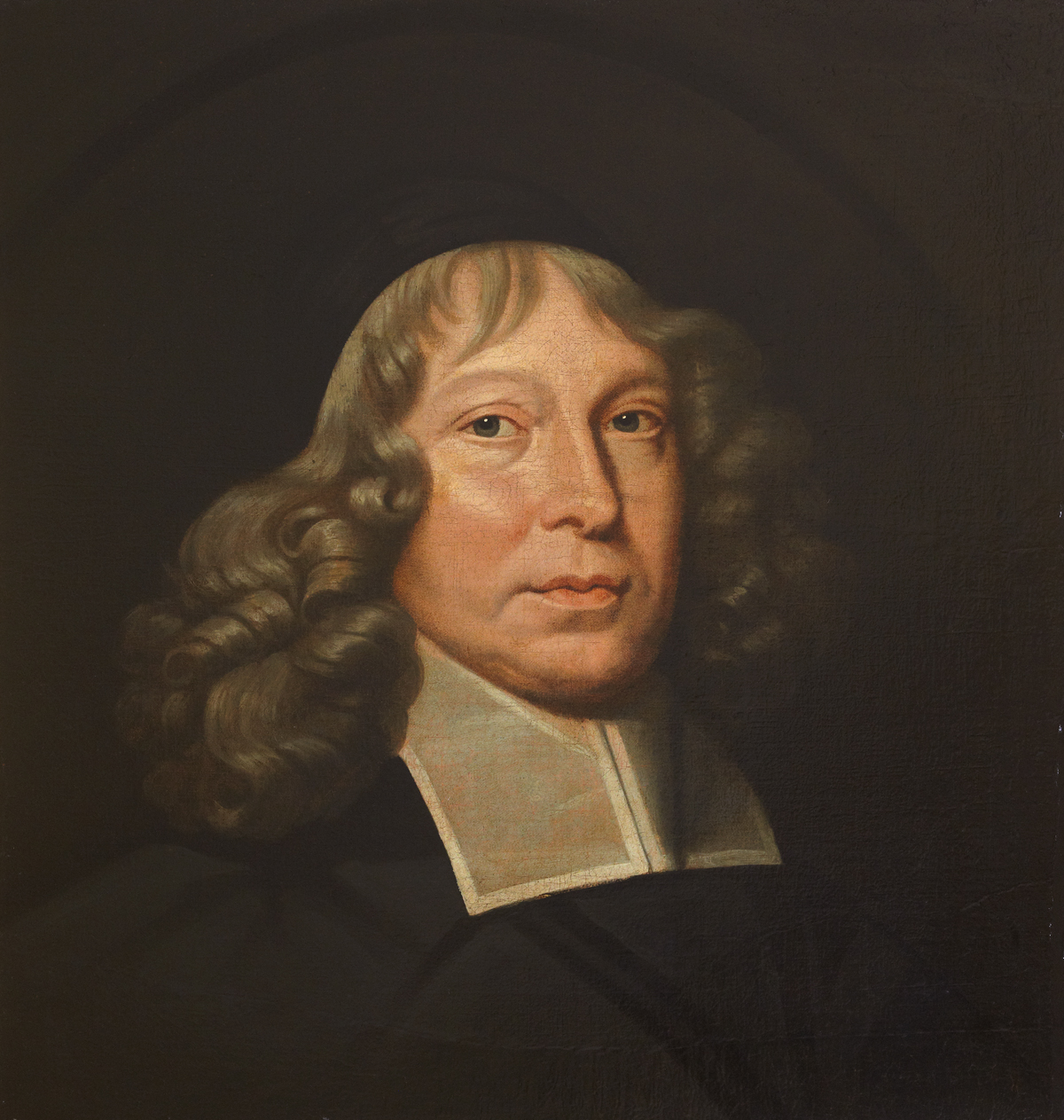
Samuel Rutherford, artist unknown, picture credit St Andrew's University

On a nearby hill, there is Rutherford's Monument, a 56-foot-high granite obelisk erected in 1842.

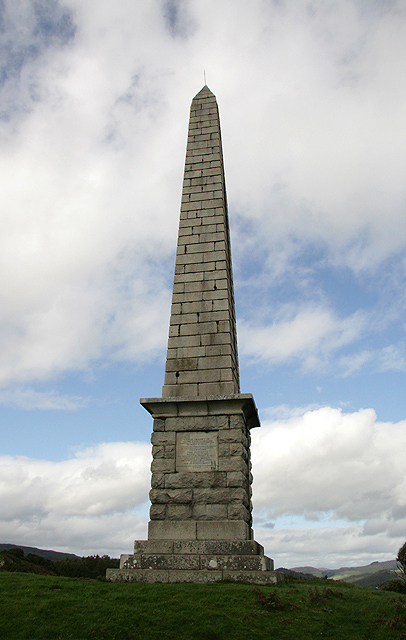
Rutherfords Monument

A millennium cairn opposite the monument lists the names of all the ministers of Anwoth and Girthon until the year 2000 when it was erected. The Old Kirk was in use until 1825, but is now just a ruin.

Anwoth Parish Church was built in 1826–1827. It is a Walter Newall Gothic box-style church with tower and hood-moulded windows. It closed in 2002. The Church of Scotland sold the Church to a neighbouring family who now keep it as a hall for ceremonies and parties. The church was re-roofed in 2007 and the building is being maintained.

An ancient fort on Trusty's Hill was occupied by Iron Age people and may have been attacked and burned by a Pictish raiding party, who carved a series of symbol stones in a rock beside the entrance passage.

Anwoth Kirk and Old School opposite were key locations for the 1973 cult film The Wicker Man.

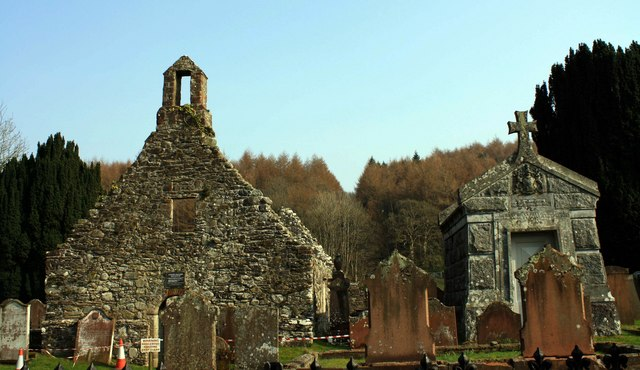
Anwoth Kirk

This area, with many references to Gatehouse of Fleet and Kirkcudbright is the location for most of Dorothy L. Sayers detective novel The Five Red Herrings.

== Literary allusion ==
Anne Ross Cousin's hymn, The Sands of Time are Sinking, mentions Anwoth, because of its historic spiritual connection with Samuel Rutherford. Verses 9 & 10 of her original nineteen stanza poem are:

The little birds of Anwoth, I used to count them blessed,
Now, beside happier altars I go to build my nest:
Over these there broods no silence, no graves around them stand,
For glory, deathless, dwelleth in Immanuel’s land.

Fair Anwoth by the Solway, to me thou still art dear,
Even from the verge of heaven, I drop for thee a tear.
Oh! If one soul from Anwoth meet me at God’s right hand,
My heaven will be two heavens, In Immanuel’s land.

== List of listed buildings ==
List of listed buildings in Anwoth, Dumfries and Galloway
