= Gatehouse of Fleet =

Town in Dumfries and Galloway, Scotland

Coordinates: 54°53′N 4°11′W

Gatehouse of Fleet: Scottish Gaelic: Taigh an Rathaid; Scots: Gatehoose o Fleet
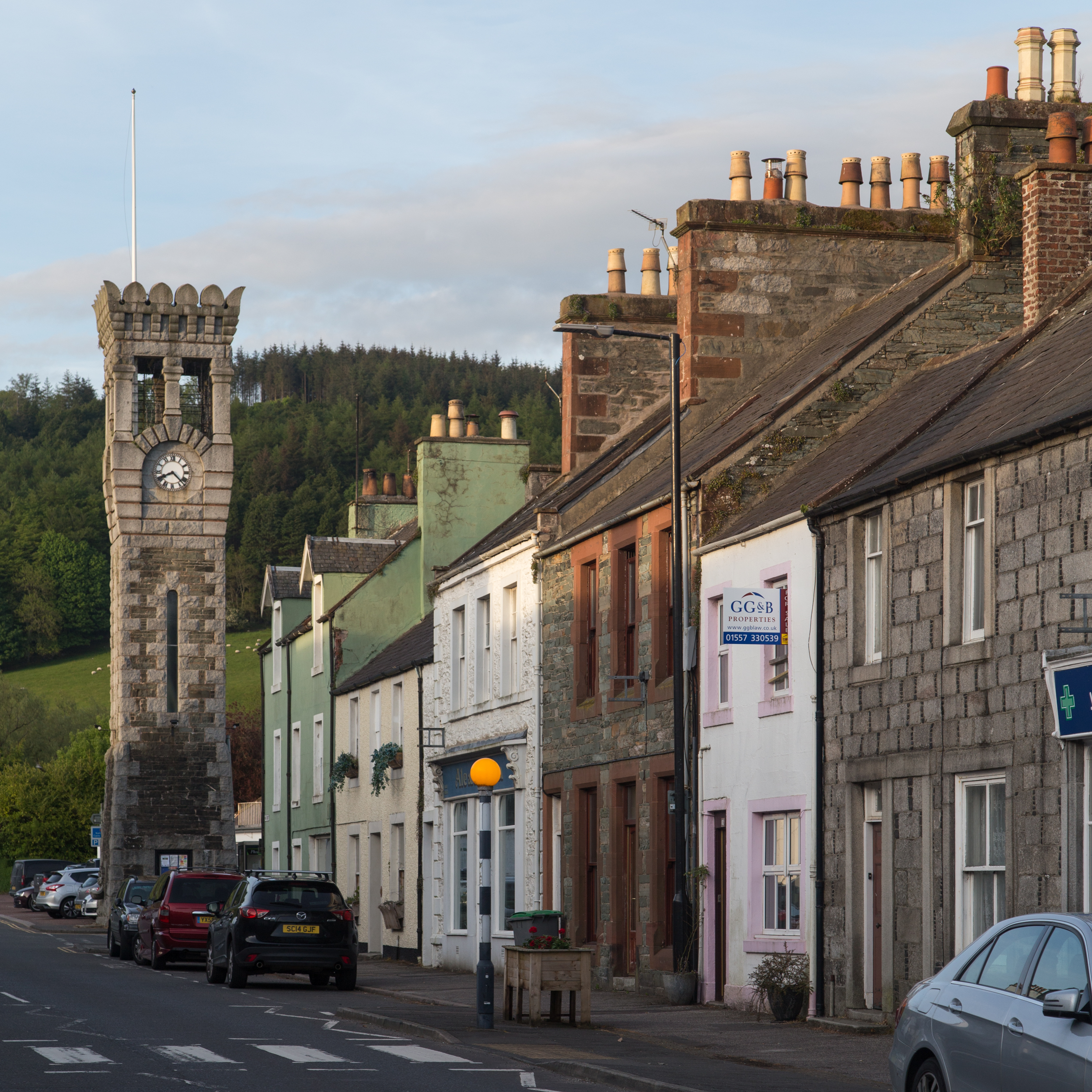
- Clock Tower on High Street

- Location within Dumfries and Galloway
- Population: 1,016 (2022)
- OS grid reference: NX597561
  - Edinburgh: 84 mi (135 km)
  - London: 287 mi (462 km)
- Council area: Dumfries and Galloway
- Lieutenancy area: Kirkcudbrightshire
- Country: Scotland
- Sovereign state: United Kingdom
- Post town: CASTLE DOUGLAS
- Postcode district: DG7
- Dialling code: 01557
- Police: Scotland
- Fire: Scottish
- Ambulance: Scottish
- UK Parliament: Dumfries and Galloway
- Scottish Parliament: Galloway and West Dumfries

Gatehouse of Fleet (Scots: Gatehoose o Fleet Scottish Gaelic: Taigh an Rathaid) is a town, half in the civil parish of Girthon, and half in the parish of Anwoth, divided by the river Fleet, Kirkcudbrightshire, within the council administrative area of Dumfries and Galloway, Scotland. It is approximately 84 miles (135 km) west-southwest of Edinburgh, 70 miles (113 km) south of Glasgow, and 15 miles (24 km) east-southeast of Newton Stewart. It had a population of 1,016 in 2022.

== History ==
The western approach to the town is dominated by the imposing Cardoness Castle. The castle was built in the late 15th century by the McCulloch family, who were notable for their lawlessness as well as their support for John Balliol's claim to the throne of Scotland in the late 13th century.

The town takes its name from its location upon the river the Water of Fleet, which empties into the Fleet Bay, eventually entering the larger Wigtown Bay. The town's former role as the Gait House, or toll booth, over the river gives it the initial part of its name.

The settlement of Anwoth is one mile (1.5 km) to the west of Gatehouse of Fleet; Samuel Rutherford was minister at Anwoth Old Church from 1627 to 1636.

The original toll booth was established for the late 18th-century stagecoach route from Dumfries to Stranraer. The route at that time is now roughly followed by the A75 road. The route was a haven for bandits and highwaymen at the time, and travellers would often stop in the area rather than continue their journey at night, to avoid the high numbers of outlaws.

Much of the town's early development was attributable to the entrepreneur James Murray's decision to build his summer home, Cally House, in the area. In 1795, Murray successfully petitioned George III to grant Gatehouse of Fleet Burgh of Barony status, further aiding development of the town. The house was designed by Robert Mylne in the mid 18th century and built in 1763, being finished that same year.

Over the century after Cally House was built, the town developed into a centre for industry. Cotton mills were a prominent aspect of the town's business, and most of the buildings were converted for other uses as time went on. The Mill on the Fleet is a converted mill that is now used as an exhibition centre for Gatehouse and the Fleet Valley area.

The Public Library in the High Street was opened in 1857 and was established by Horatio Murray Stewart of Cally House, the local landowner. The building was then refurbished between 1963 and 1965 by local architect Antony Curtiss Wolffe.

The Clock Tower is the most noticeable landmark within the town, and dates back to 1871. It was designed by architect Frederick Thomas Pilkington.

Cally House was a stately home, formerly the seat of the Murrays of Broughton and Cally. It was converted for use as a residential school for evacuees from Glasgow during the Second World War, reopening as a hotel in the later 1940s. Since then, the house has been operating as the Cally Palace, a hotel with its own 18-hole golf course.

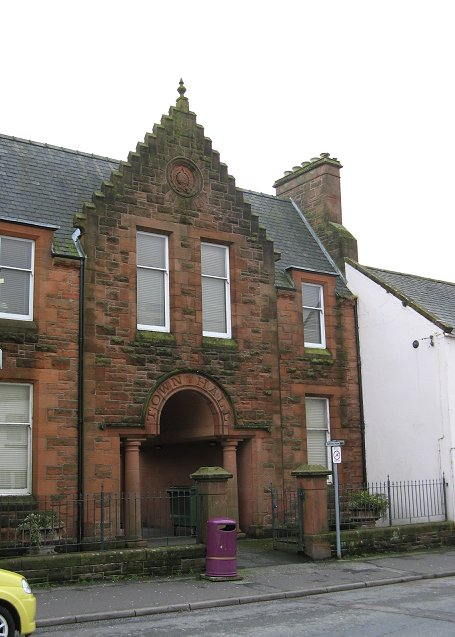
Gatehouse of Fleet Town Hall

Gatehouse of Fleet Town Hall, designed by James Robart Pearson, was completed in 1885 and benefits from a fine ornamental garden to its rear side.

The Church of the Resurrection, 1971 was designed by Sutherland, Dickie & Copland. The last Mass was celebrated on 1 February 2020 by the Bishop of Galloway, William Nolan and parish priest Rev Fr William McFadden. The church has since been demolished and the site sold for housing.

== Filming of The Wicker Man ==
The former Cally Estate Office was used to depict The Green Man Inn in the 1973 horror film The Wicker Man, in which a Christian policeman, played by Edward Woodward, investigates the disappearance of a missing girl in a remote community led by Christopher Lee on the Scottish island of Summerisle. Scenes were filmed outside the building with actors Edward Woodward as PC Howie and Britt Ekland as Willow, the landlord's daughter. Other scenes were filmed nearby at Anwoth, at the Old Kirk and at the Old Schoolhouse.

== Scheduled Monuments ==
The Gatehouse of Fleet Roman Fortlet is a Scheduled Monument; however, there are no extant remains. This fortlet may have existed "during the campaigns of governor Agricola sometime around 81 AD", and may have housed a garrison of about 80 men.

Another Scheduled Monument in the Gatehouse of Fleet is Cardoness Castle, built in the late 15th century by a branch of Clan McCulloch.

== Notable people ==
- Joe Ansbro the rugby player was raised near Gatehouse of Fleet and attended Gatehouse Primary School. He is the first player of African origin to represent Scotland at test level.
- Katrina Bryan, the "Nina" of the CBeebies show Nina and the Neurons, was born in the town in 1980.
- Jeanie Donnan (1864-1942), "The Galloway Poetess", was born here before moving to Whithorn in Wigtownshire where she lived on George Street and where she is commemorated by a plaque. She wrote poetry about local events. Her works include Hameland: The Poems of Jeanie Donnan, 1907; War Poems, 1915; The Hills of Hame, 1930. Many of her poems were also published in the Galloway Gazette.
- John Faed, James Faed, Thomas Faed, Boab Patterson-Faed and Susan Faed, members of the celebrated family of Victorian artists, were all born at Barlay Mill, Gatehouse of Fleet.
- Richard Gilbey, 12th Baron Vaux of Harrowden.
- Sir James Learmonth, (1895-1967) was a Scottish surgeon who made pioneering advances in nerve surgery. Surgeon to George VI in Scotland and later to Elizabeth II.
- Catherwood Learmonth (1896-1981) spent his early life here.
- Hamish MacInnes, the well known mountaineer and pioneer of mountain rescue in Scotland was born in the town in 1930.
- Sir John McMichael (1904-1993), Professor of Medicine at Hammersmith Hospital, London, Director of the British Postgraduate Medical Federation and a trustee of the Wellcome Trust, was born in the town.
- Henry Joseph Moule (1825-1904), artist, lived 1860–1877 in Rosebank, Ann Street. Factor to Horatio Murray Stewart of Cally House.
- Dorothy L. Sayers (1893-1957), published her sixth novel, The Five Red Herrings, featuring Lord Peter Wimsey in 1931 and has scenes set in Gatehouse and Kirkcudbright. The novel includes a foreword in the form of a personal letter from the author "To my friend Joe Dignam, kindliest of landlords". The letter starts: "Here at last is your book about Gatehouse and Kirkcudbright". Joe Dignam was the landlord of The Ship Inn where Sayers and her husband Mac Fleming stayed while on holiday in the area.
- the Maharaja of Jind, Sir Ranbir Singh (1879-1948) was the Maharaja of Jind in the Punjab. He ruled Jind from 1887 to 1948. Lived at Cally House, 1930-1932.
- James Wolffe (born 20 December 1962) is a Scottish advocate who served as Lord Advocate from 2016 to 2021. Son of the local architect Antony Curtiss Wolffe.

== Provosts ==
Gatehouse of Fleet had a provost for part of its history: These included:

- George Brown, 1818
- James Kirkpatrick, 1819
- Nelson Rae, 1821
- John Armstrong, 1824
- Thomas Birkett, 1825
- David Credie, 1827
- Samuel Menzies, 1830
- ? 1832
- Samuel McLellan, 1834
- John McWilliam, 1835
- David Campbell, 1836
- James Bain, 1838
- John Sproat, 1842
- David Bain, 1846
- David Credie, 1848
- William Ramage, May 1849
- Andrew Kirk, November 1849
- Thomas Kirkpatrick, 1852
- Andrew Kirk, 1854
- William Gordon, 1858
- James McKean, 1859
- Charles McTaggart, 1866
- James Campbell, 1869
- James McKean, 1871
- J.N. Cox, 1879
- William Cairns, 1887
- J.R. Kirkpatrick, 1890
- William Cairns, 1892
- John Moodie, 1896
- A.S. Campbell, 1899
- H. Buxton, 1905
- Andrew Laurie, 1911
- A.S. Campbell, 1914
- Andrew Laurie, 1920
- Alexander McCutcheon, 1931
- A.A. Stewart, 1941
- Robert Veitch, 1951
- Col. D.Q.H. Agnew, 1959
- Wilfred Davidson, 1962-1966

Town Council replaced by Community Council

- George Waddell, 1975
- Alexandra Wolffe, 1979
- Annie MacKay, 1990
- A. Maclaren 1993
- Mark Laird, 1998
- Franca Bruno, 2002
- Mark Laird, 2007
- Sue Best
- Helen Keating, 2023
- Mark Laird, 2025

== Attractions ==
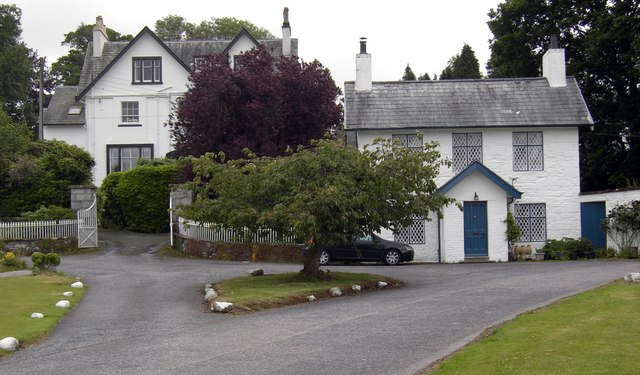
Cox's Lodge in Gatehouse of Fleet

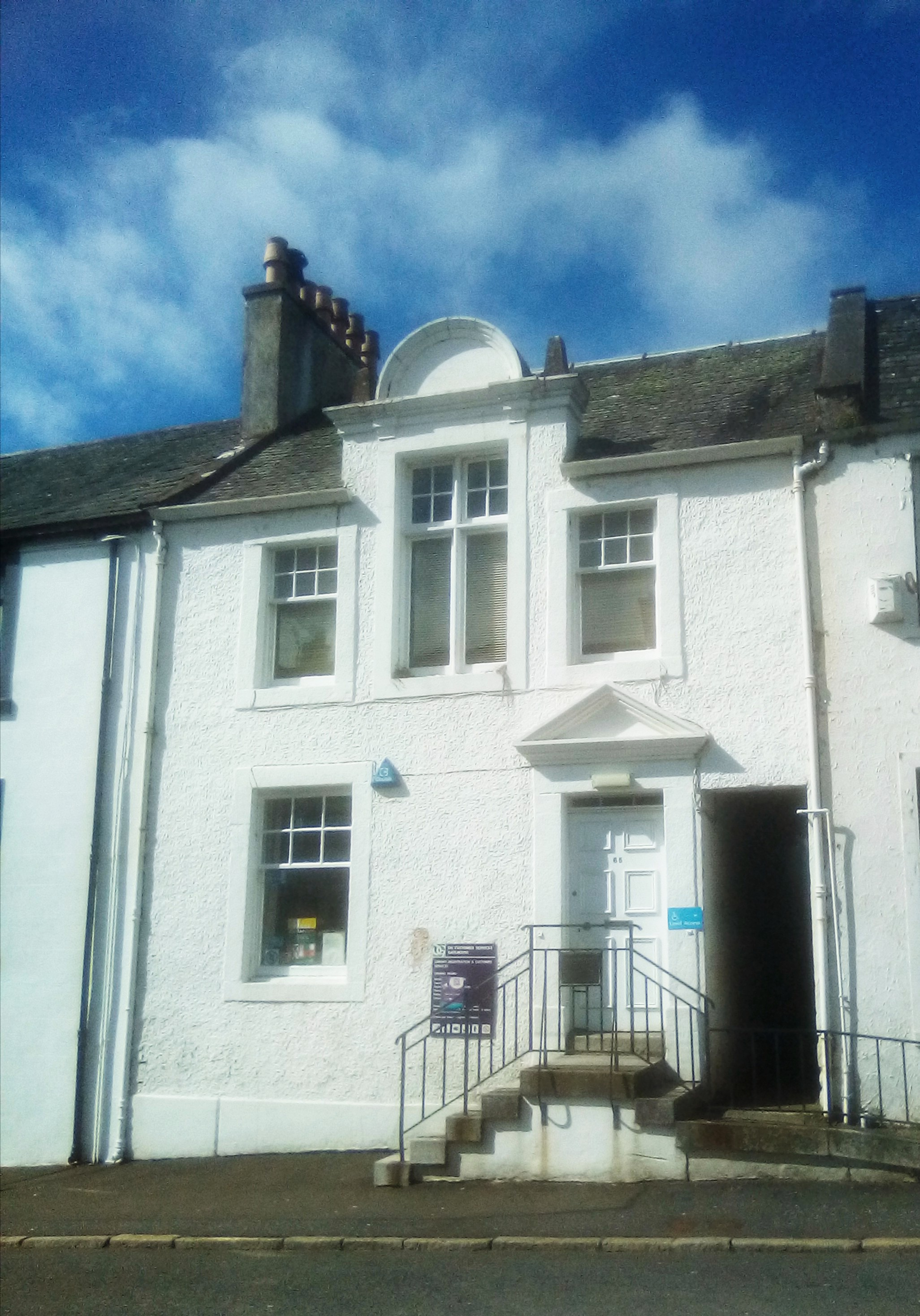
Gatehouse Library

Garries Park is adjacent to Gatehouse of Fleet and is used for a variety of events throughout the year; the most notable being events throughout the Gala week. The park also serves as the home ground of Fleet Star Football Club. The village formerly had a senior football club, Fleetside Rovers F.C., which entered the Scottish Qualifying Cup from 1902–03 to 1911–12.

The Mill on the Fleet built in 1785 is a restored cotton mill on the banks of the River Fleet. It features displays on the history of the town and the Fleet Valley, a café with a riverside terrace, a second hand bookshop and the Gatehouse Tourist Information Centre.

On the edge of the town is situated the historically significant Cardoness Castle.

Beaches near the town can be found at Carrick, Cardoness, Mossyard and Sandgreen.

Rainton Farm is situated 3 miles (5 km) from the town and is home to a dairy company, The Ethical Dairy, a cheese production company.

The Clints of Dromore near the old Gatehouse of Fleet railway station provide rock-climbing.

For gravel cyclists, the forest tracks around Gatehouse of Fleet are "some of the best gravel trails in the UK". This has led to events such as the 2023 UCI Mountain Bike season race, The Gralloch, being held in and around Gatehouse.

== Gatehouse Gala ==
Gatehouse Gala is an annual, week long series of events that take place in late July and early August, such that Gala Day is the first Saturday in August.

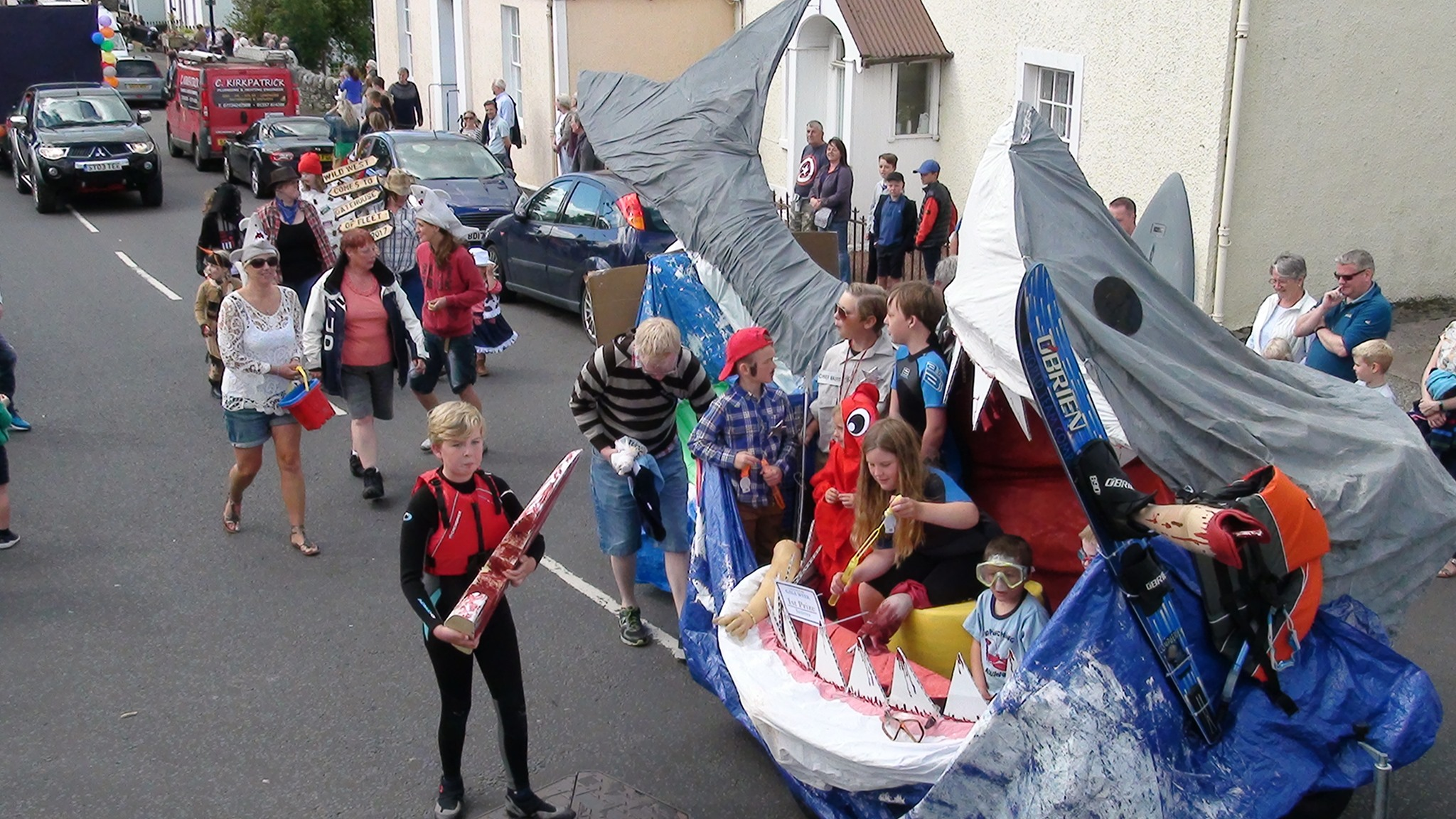
An entrant to the 2017 float competition

Events include fireworks, guided walks, competitions and music.

Each year, a "Gala Queen" (formerly "Miss Gatehouse") is elected from the Primary 7 year at Gatehouse Primary School along with a Queen's Consort. The Queen's Attendant and Queen's Page are elected from the Primary 3 year. The group of four lead the events throughout the week and hand the positions over to the newly elected at the opening ceremony of the following year's Gala.
