= Cardoness Castle =

15th-century tower house in Scotland

Coordinates: 54.8723°N 4.1980°W

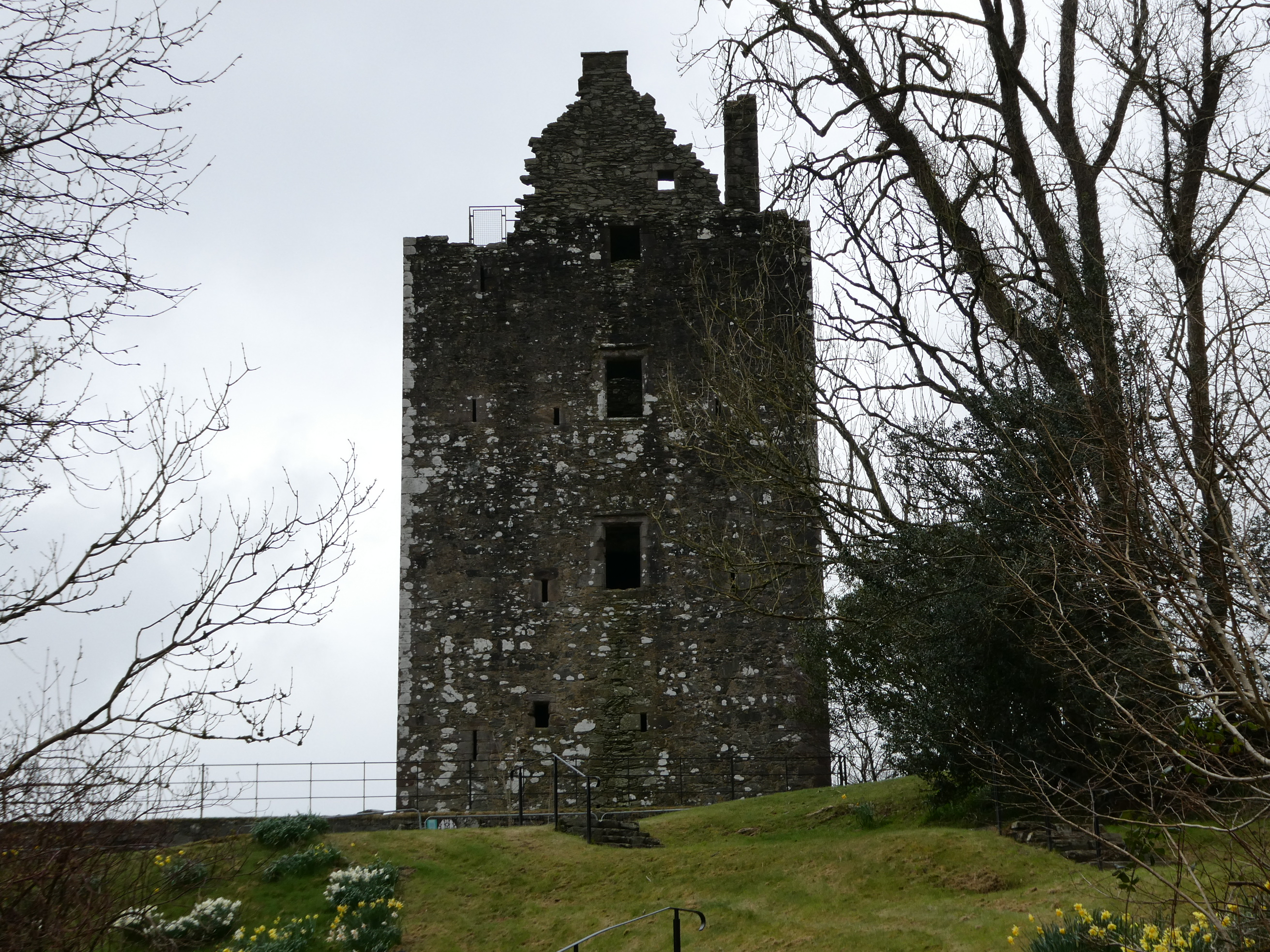
- The castle in 2024
- Interactive map of the Cardoness Castle area

General information
- Status: Ruined; in state care, open to the public
- Type: Tower house
- Location: South west of Gatehouse of Fleet, Kirkcudbrightshire, Scotland
- Year built: Late 15th century
- Owner: Historic Environment Scotland

Design and construction
- Designations: Scheduled monument (since 1928)

Cardoness Castle is a well-preserved 15th-century tower house just south west of Gatehouse of Fleet, in the historical county of Kirkcudbrightshire in Scotland. It was originally owned by the MacCullochs of Myreton. They abandoned the castle in the late 17th century, following the execution of Sir Godfrey McCulloch for the murder of a Clan Gordon neighbour. It is now in the care of Historic Environment Scotland, and is a scheduled monument.

== History ==
Around 1170, the lands of Anwoth were granted by Malcolm IV to David fitz Teri, a Cumbrian lord, who built a motte-and-bailey castle at Boreland, close to the present castle. In 1220, a Nicholas de Kerdenes and his wife Cicely were in dispute with the monastery at Dundrennan over Cicely's dowry—he eventually appealed to the Pope. In 1277, Bertram de Kerdennes was a witness to a charter by King Alexander III (reigned 1249–1286), confirming a grant by Devorguilla de Balliol to Glasgow Cathedral. On 18 June 1342, Malcolm Fleming, Earl of Wigtown, was granted a charter of the lands of Cardoness, in Galloway, from King David II in excambion (exchange) for the lands of Mochrum which the King had formerly given him. He was also granted other lands in Wigtownshire.

The lands of Cardoness were in the McCulloch family by 1466. Writing in 1864, Sir Andrew Agnew recorded a local tradition relating how the McCullochs came to possess Cardoness:

A certain laird of Cardoness, having exhausted his resources in the building of his castle, joined a band of border thieves, and amassed considerable property by plunder. During twenty years of married life his wife had borne him nine daughters; but this did not satisfy his now increased anxiety to perpetuate his name, and he threatened his lady that, unless at her approaching confinement, she produced a son, he would drown her and all her nine daughters in the Black Loch, and look out for another wife. The probability of his carrying out this threat was not doubted for a moment, and hence great was the joy of the lady and her neighbours when she actually presented her husband with a boy. It was now mid-winter, and the lake firmly frozen over, whereupon the laird announced his determination of giving a grand fete on this same Black Loch. In accordance with his orders, on a certain Sunday his whole family was there assembled excepting one daughter, who was unable to join the party. The revels were at their height, when suddenly the ice gave way, and the old sinner was plunged himself into the dark waters and perished miserably, with all his family, only excepting the one young lady, who, having thus narrowly escaped the same fate, shortly after, married one of the McCullochs[.]

The McCulloch lairds built the present Cardoness Castle in the late 15th century. In the 1560s, an English spy reported on the castle to Elizabeth I of England, in preparation for a planned invasion of Scotland that never took place. In 1622, the Gordons of Ardwall acquired the mortgaged estate. Feuding between the McCullochs and the Gordons culminated in 1690, when Sir Godfrey McCulloch shot dead William Gordon of Buck o'Bield. Sir Godfrey escaped to France, but was spotted in Edinburgh in 1697 and beheaded on the Maiden, the Scottish equivalent of the guillotine. It was subsequently uninhabited, and passed through the hands of a number of owners before being placed in state care in 1927. It has been protected as a scheduled monument since 1928, and is now maintained by Historic Environment Scotland. The castle is open to the public.

== Gallery ==
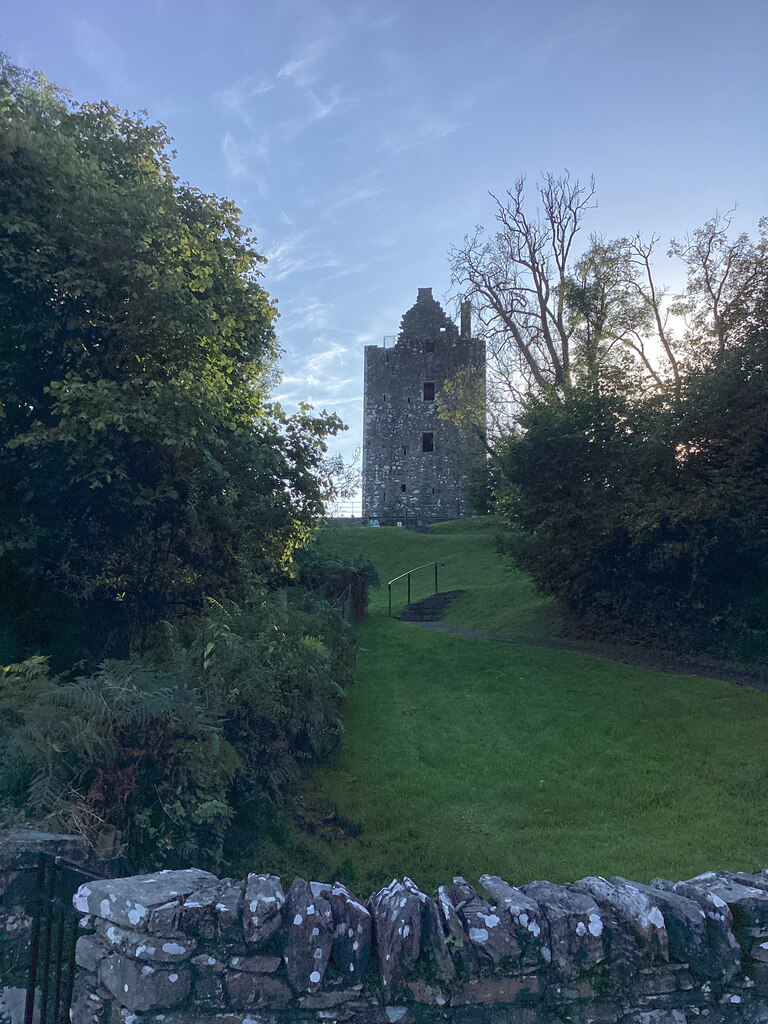
The castle in 2024

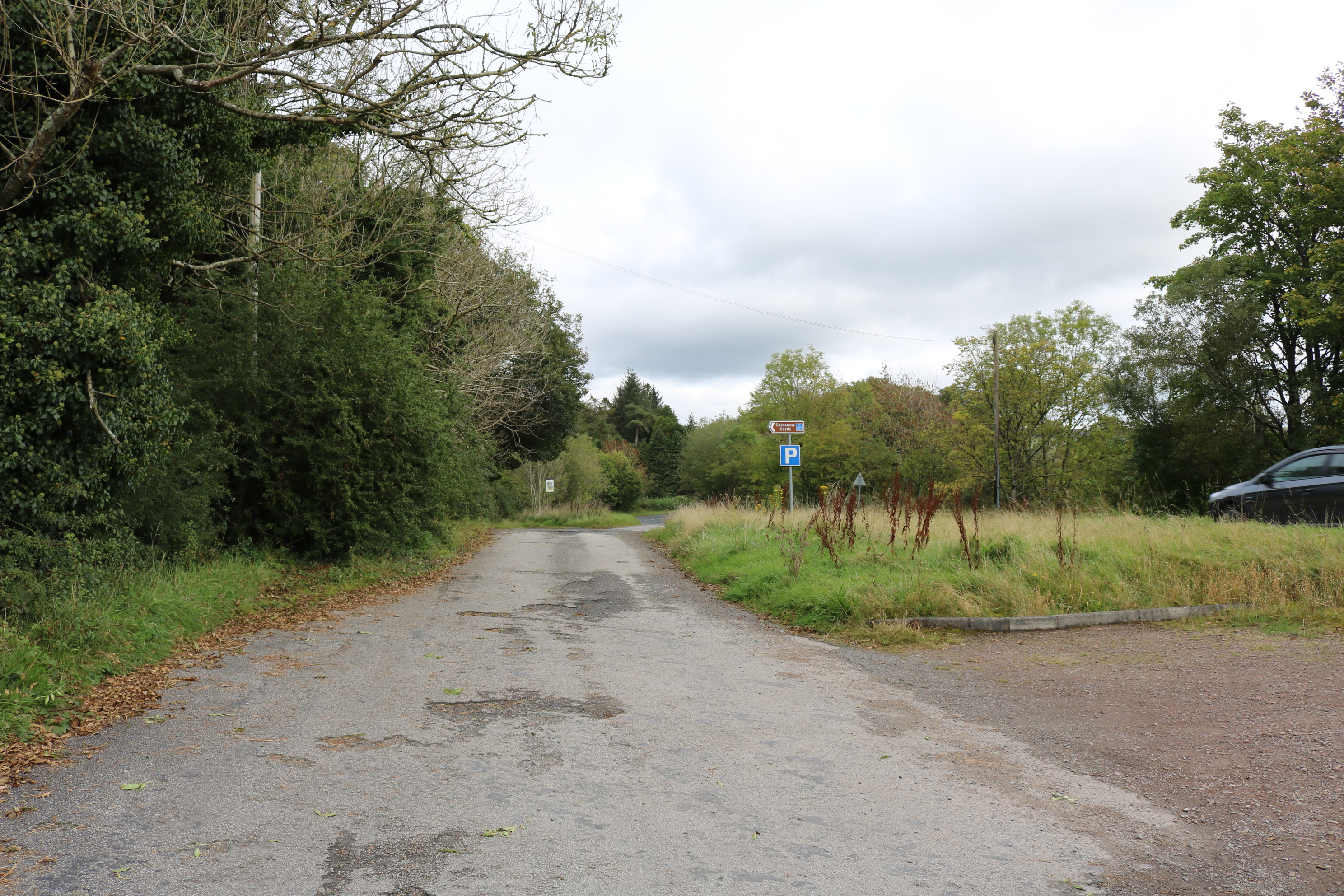
Castle exit in 2020

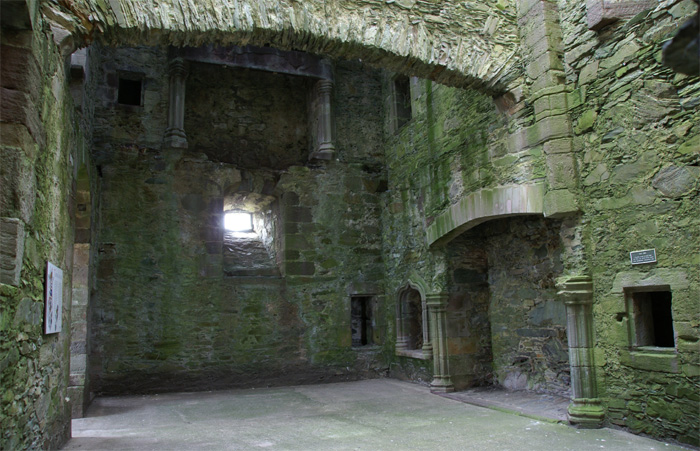
The interior in 2008

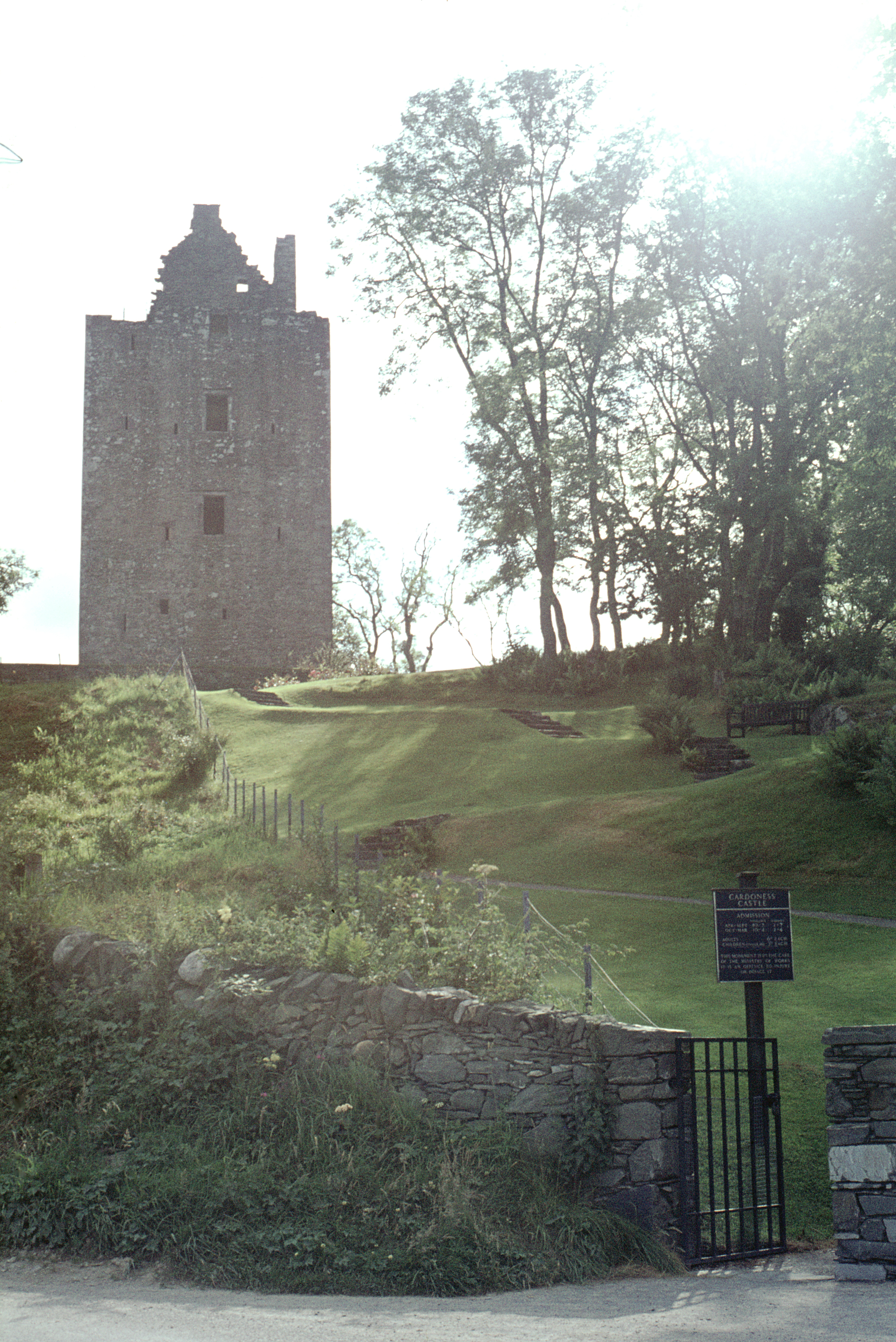
The castle in 1965
