= Anwoth Old Church =

Ruined church in Dumfries and Galloway, Scotland

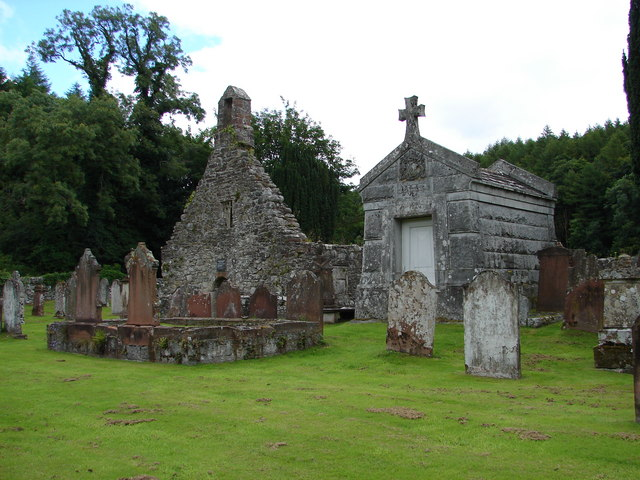
- The remains of the church and the adjacent mausoleum
- Anwoth Old Church
- 54°52′50″N 4°12′38″W
- Location: Anwoth, Dumfries and Galloway
- Country: Scotland
- Denomination: Church of Scotland

History
- Founded: 1626

Architecture
- Functional status: Unused since 1826
- Heritage designation: Scheduled monument (cross slab and Gordon tomb), Category A listed building (church and churchyard)
- Designated: 1963 (scheduled), 1971 (listed)

Anwoth Old Church is a ruined church building which was built in 1626 to serve the parish of Anwoth in the historic county of Kirkcudbrightshire in the administrative area of Dumfries and Galloway, Scotland. It is roofless, but much of the walls remain, including the west gable which is surmounted by a bellcote. A number of substantial monuments exist within the church and its surrounding churchyard.

Anwoth was the seat of Samuel Rutherford's ministry from 1627 until he was banned from preaching and exiled to Aberdeen in 1636. The church underwent substantial improvements in the early 18th Century, and remained in use until 1826 when it was partly dismantled and Anwoth Parish Church was built. The remains of the building, along with its churchyard, are designated a Category A listed building; a tomb of the Gordon family and a 12-century cross slab within the churchyard are separately designated a scheduled monument.

== History ==
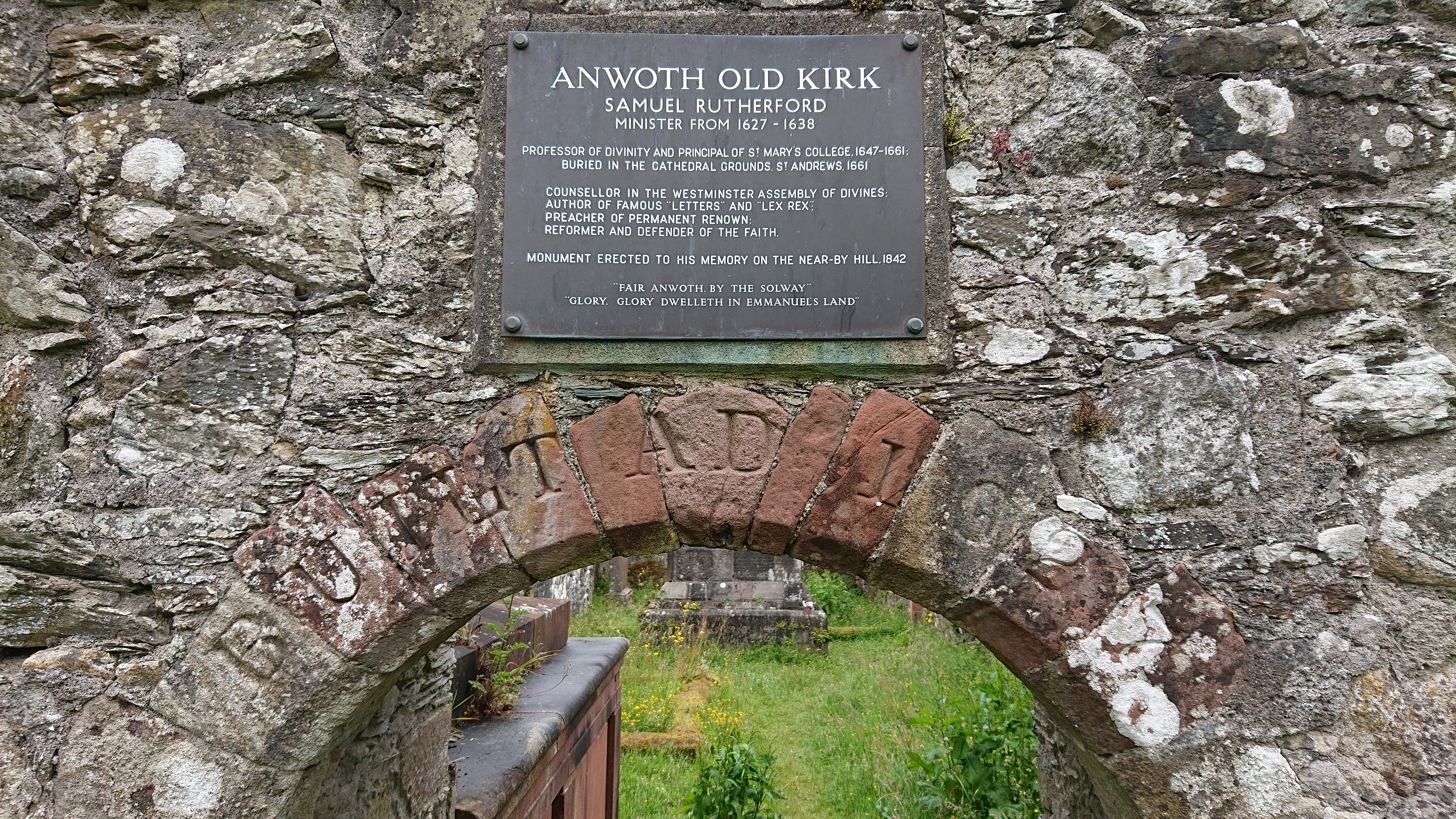
The engraved arch above the entrance in the west wall.

The earliest records of religious activity at Anwoth date back to the 12th century, when the parish was granted to Holyrood Abbey. A cross slab, dating to around 1100, was found in the churchyard in the late 19th century.

Anwoth Old Church itself was built in 1626; the inscription in the arch above its doorway shows a date of 1627, but this was added much later and was likely influenced by the date when Samuel Rutherford started his ministry at the church. Rutherford came to Anwoth in 1627, shortly after receiving his licence to preach the gospel, at the invitation of John Gordon of Kenmure. Gordon died in 1634, and the following year an elaborate monument was constructed within the church, commemorating Gordon, his parents, and his two wives. Rutherford remained at the parish until 1636, when his disagreements with the church authorities led to his prohibition from practising as a minister and exile to Aberdeen.

Substantial improvements were made to the church in 1710 by William Maxwell of Cardoness and his wife, Nicola Stewart. These probably involved internal rearrangement of the church so that its pulpit backed onto the south wall, the addition of round-arched doors and rectangular windows to the gable ends, and the bellcote to the west gable. The church continued to be used until 1826, when it was dismantled and a new church constructed. The new church, Anwoth Parish Church, was built by Walter Newall for the Church of Scotland.

The cross slab and Gordon tomb were scheduled in 1963; the rest of the structure, and the churchyard around it, were designated a Category A listed building in 1971.

== Description ==
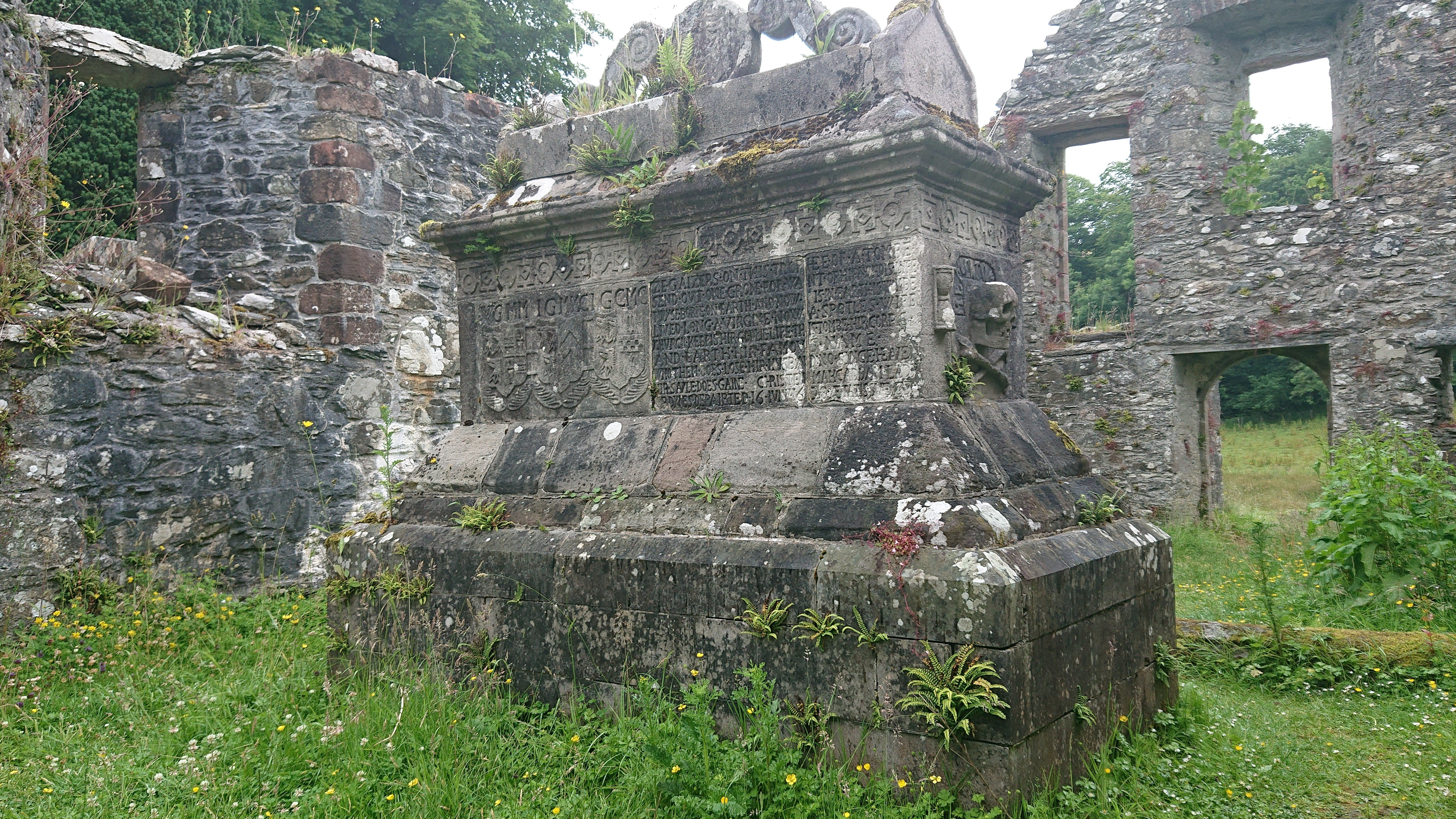
The memorial to John Gordon and his family.

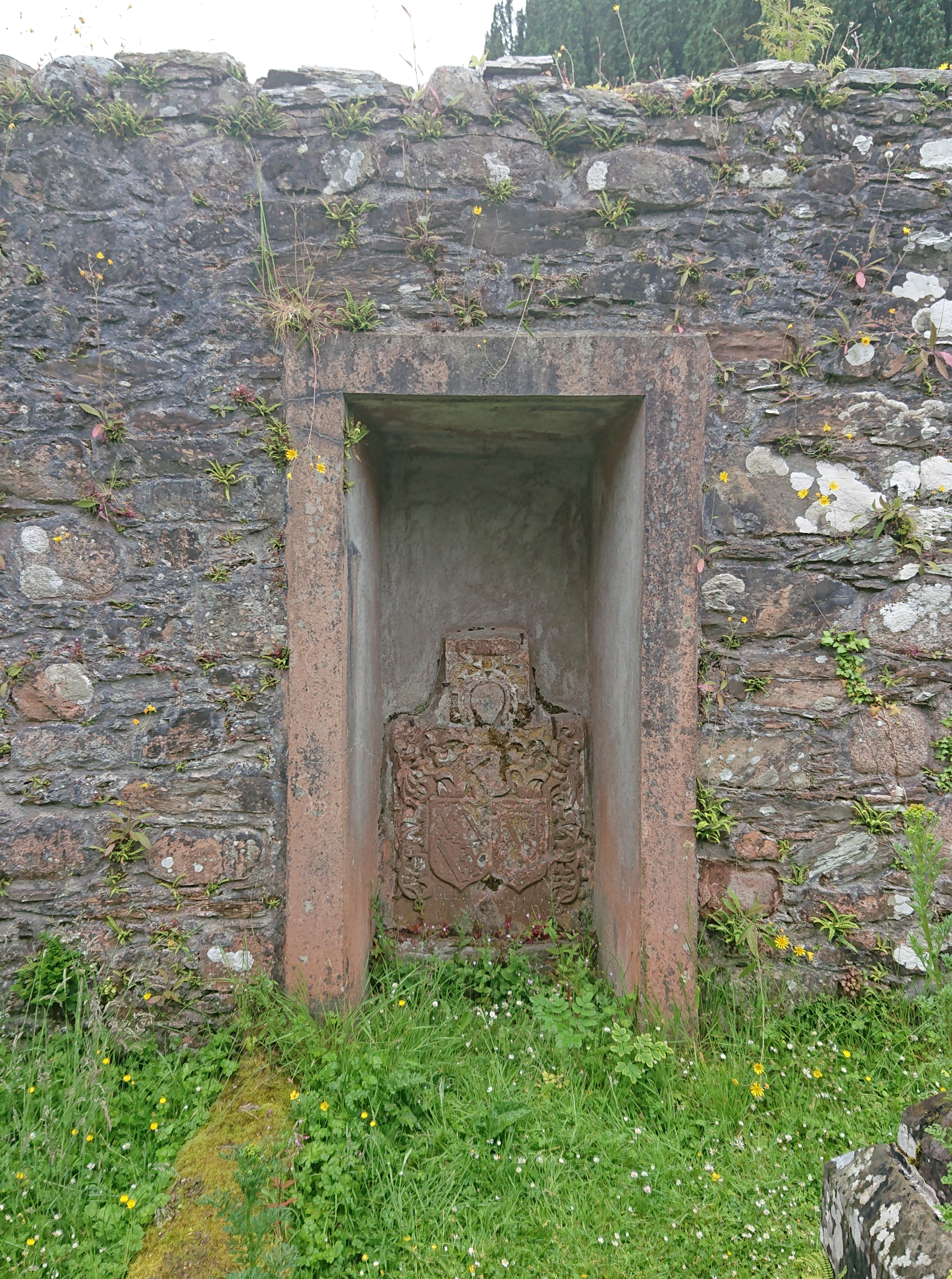
The blocked doorway in the south wall.

The remains of the church are roofless, and form a long, narrow rectangle (21.3 metres (70 ft) by 5.6 metres (18 ft)), typical of early post-Reformation Scottish churches, and oriented west to east. Its walls are 1.1 metres (3.6 ft) thick, and there are round-arched doors in the east and west gable ends, each beneath a rectangular window, all of which have chamfered stonework surrounds. There is a substantial bellcote at the apex of the west gable.

Inside the church, in a blocked doorway in the south wall where the entrance to the church would originally have been, there is now a panel inscribed "Rebuilt Anno 1710 by WM, NS", and displaying the arms of Maxwell of Cardoness and his wife Stewart.

In the centre of the church is a large sarcophagus monument. Above a plinth is a tomb chest, which is decorated with an array of geometric patterns, scrollwork, finials, skeletons, crossbones, and the arms of the Gordons. The memorial bears initials for John Gordon, his parents William Gordon of Cullindoch and Marion Mure, his first wife Margaret McClellan, and his second wife Christian MacCadam, and there are panels with inscriptions dedicated to each of the three women.

To the north west of the church stands the 12th century cross slab. A rough slab of rock approximately 950 millimetres (37 in) high, 400 millimetres (16 in) wide and 80 millimetres (3.1 in) thick, it has a bulbous cross carved into its surface. Also in the churchyard is a monument to John Bell, a covenanter who was shot in 1685, and an early 19th-century mausoleum, which was rebuilt in 1878 by Sir William Maxwell of Cardoness. This is a large, Egypto-Grecian structure, with granite walls and a wooden door.

== The Wicker Man ==
The churchyard was used as a location for scenes in the 1973 horror film The Wicker Man. The film's plot sees Christian policeman Neil Howie (played by Edward Woodward) investigating the disappearance of a missing girl in a remote pagan community led by Lord Summerisle (Christopher Lee).

== Football ==
In April 2025, historian Ged O’Brien and archaeologists from Archaeology Scotland stated that they had found "compelling evidence" that a small piece of land near the church was the oldest known football pitch in the world, dating from at least 1627. Reportedly, Reverend Samuel Rutherford was outraged that parishioners played football during the afternoon of Sabbath and ordered that they place a row of large stones across the field to prevent further games. Soil tests from the site indicated that the stones had been placed there during Rutherford's tenure.

== Sources ==
- "Anwoth, Old Kirk, Churchyard And Gordon Tomb". Canmore.
- Historic Environment Scotland. "Anwoth Old Church Churchyard, excluding Scheduled Monument No 2340 'Anwoth Old Church, Cross Slab and Gordon Tomb', Anwoth (Category A Listed Building LB3309)".
- "Anwoth Parish Church". Places of Worship in Scotland. Scottish Church Heritage Research Ltd.
- Coldwell, Will (30 October 2017). "10 of the best horror movie locations". The Guardian. Guardian News and Media Ltd.
- Gifford, John (1996). The Buildings of Scotland:Dumfries and Galloway. London: Penguin. ISBN 0140-71067-1.
- Historic Environment Scotland. "Anwoth Old Church, cross slab & Gordon Tomb (Category A Listed Building SM2340)".
- Historic Environment Scotland. "Anwoth Parish Church (Category B Listed Building LB3296)".
- "Samuel Rutherford – Fair Anwoth by the Solway – 1627 – 1636". Free Presbyterian Church of Scotland.
- Smith, Adam (1 January 2000). "Empire Essay: The Wicker Man Review". Empire. Bauer Media Group.
