= Faed =

Faed is both a given name and a Scottish surname. It may refer to:

== Given name ==
- Faed Arsène (born 1985), Malagasy former footballer
- Faed Mustafa (born 1965), Palestinian diplomat

== Surname ==
As a surname, Faed is of Scottish origin referring to the Galloway region. It was derived from the shortening of the surname Macfeat. The Faed family are a famous group of Scottish artists.

Notable people with the surname Faed include:

- James Faed (1821-1911), one of the three famous Scottish brother painter/artists
- John Faed (1819-1902), one of the three famous Scottish brother painter/artists
- Susan Faed (1827-1909), Scottish artist and sister to the Faed brothers
- Thomas Faed (1826-1900), Scottish painter and illustrator of Evangeline and the third Scottish painter brother
