= William Crawford (artist) =

Scottish painter

William Crawford ARSA (1822–1869) was a Scottish portrait and genre painter.

== Life ==
He was born on 9 August 1822 in Ayr the second son of the auctioneer and poet Archibald Crawfurd (sic) and his wife Catherine Craig.

His father placed him at the Trustees' Academy in Edinburgh, under Sir William Allan, where he gained a travelling bursary, which enabled him to study in Rome for about two years. On his return he conducted the drawing classes of the Trustees' Academy for several years, and also occasionally contributed art criticisms to Edinburgh newspapers. He was very successful and in 1850 is listed as a "portrait painter" living at a huge Georgian townhouse at 46 Great King Street in Edinburgh's Second New town.

In 1848, together with William Fettes Douglas, Thomas Faed, John Faed, James Archer and John Ballantyne, he was a founding member of the Edinburgh Smashers Club: a drawing club.

He found the patronage of Alexander Maconochie, Lord Meadowbank (an Edinburgh judge) in mid career.

His crayon portraits, of which a good many were exhibited at the Royal Academy in London, were much sought after. He was elected an Associate of the Royal Scottish Academy in 1862. Among his genre paintings we may mention his 'Highland Keeper's Daughter' (1866), 'Waiting for the Ferry,' 'Return from Maying,' and 'Too Late,' a striking picture exhibited at the Royal Scottish Academy.

He died on 2 August 1869 leaving a widow and child.
