= Gatehouse of Fleet Town Hall =

Municipal building in Gatehouse of Fleet, Scotland

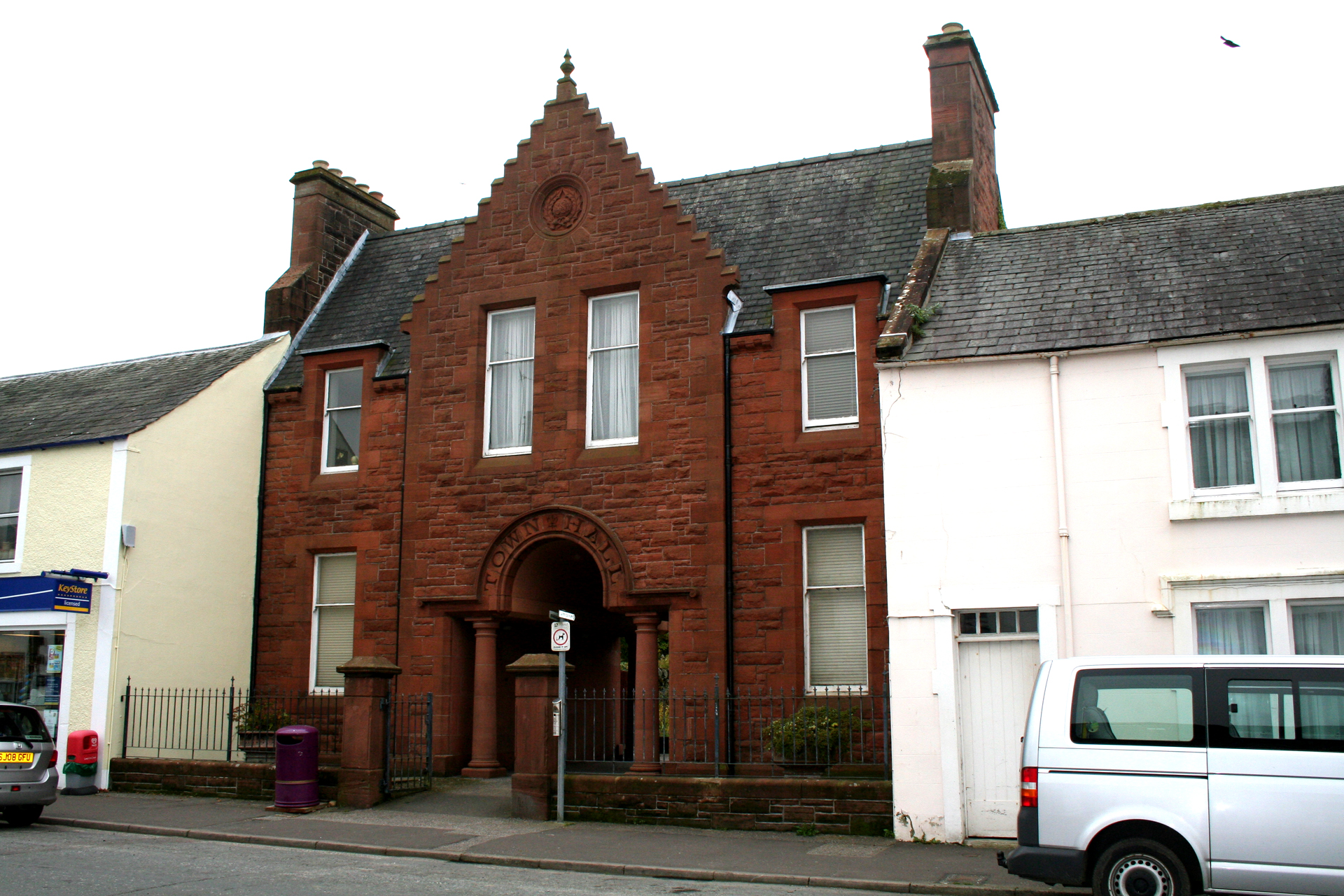
- Gatehouse of Fleet Town Hall

- Shown in Dumfries and Galloway
- 54.8822°N 4.1834°W
- Location: High Street, Gatehouse of Fleet

History
- Built: 1885

Site notes
- Architect: James Robart Pearson
- Architectural style: Renaissance style

Gatehouse of Fleet Town Hall is a former municipal building in the High Street in Gatehouse of Fleet, Dumfries and Galloway, Scotland. The structure, which is now in private residential ownership, provides access to a fine ornamental garden behind the town hall.

== History ==
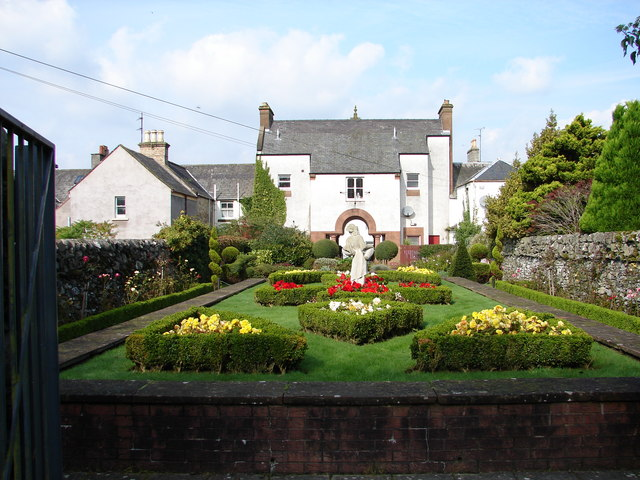
The ornamental garden behind the town hall

Although Gatehouse of Fleet became a police burgh in 1852, it was not until the early 1880s that proposals for a town hall emerged and, even then, the initiative was led by the artists, John and Thomas Faed who lived at Barlay Mill. The site that the burgh council selected, on the southeast side of the High Street, was occupied by a public house, The Commercial Inn. The provost, James Cox, oversaw the project during the delivery stage.

The new building was designed by James Robart Pearson of Edinburgh in the Renaissance style, built in red sandstone and was officially opened by Thomas Faed on 11 August 1885. As part of the celebrations, a painting, View of Gatehouse of Fleet, by John Faed was unveiled by his sister, Susan, and his wife, Jane.

The design involved a symmetrical main frontage with three bays facing onto the High Street; the central bay, which slightly projected forward, featured a doorway on the ground floor, two sash window on the first floor and a stepped gable with a finial above. The outer bays were fenestrated by sash windows on both floors. Internally, the principal room was the main assembly hall on the first floor which contained an arched recess in which to display the painting.

A cinema showing silent films operated in the town hall in the first half of the 20th century. By 1973 it was found that the rear of the building was unsafe and the burgh council decided to close the hall to the public, demolish it and engage the local architect Antony Curtiss Wolffe to draw up plans for a remodelling.

The town hall continued to serve as the meeting place of the burgh council but ceased to be the local seat of government when the enlarged Stewartry District Council was formed in 1975. Alterations to a design by Antony Curtis Wolffe were completed in the 1970s and a major reconstruction of the building, to a design by the district architect's department at Stewartry District Council, was completed in time for the bicentenary of the town in 1995. The reconstruction involved a new pend being driven through the building to allow access to the fine ornamental garden behind the town hall. The entrance to the pend was flanked by a pair of Doric order columns supporting an arch of voussoirs, inscribed with the words "Town Hall", and a round headed hood mould. The building was transferred to private residential ownership, and the painting by John Faed was relocated to the local schoolhouse and subsequently to the Mill on the Fleet visitor and exhibition centre.
