= Blueskin (horse) =

Horse owned by George Washington

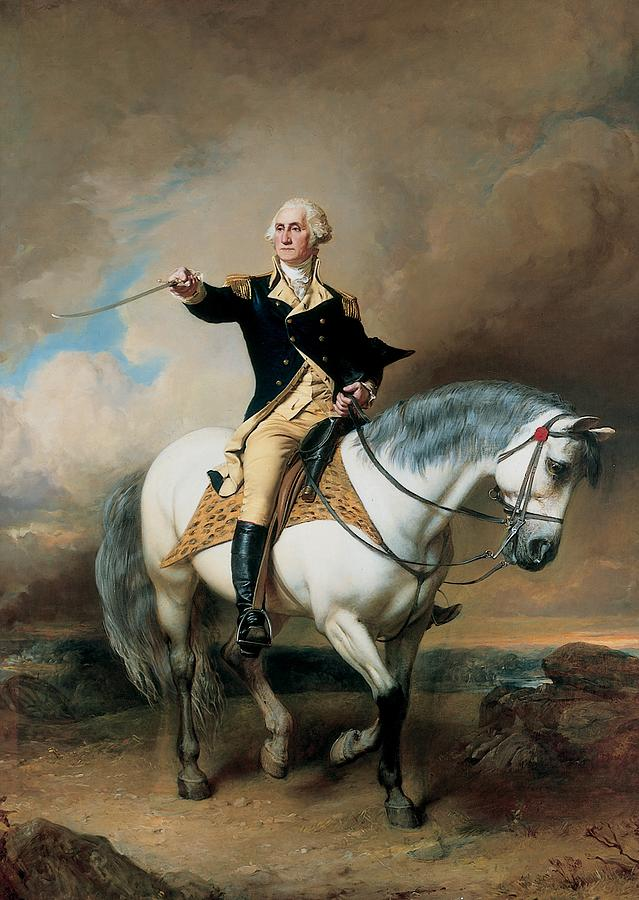
Portrait of George Washington Taking the Salute at Trenton by John Faed, featuring Blueskin

Blueskin was a gray horse ridden by George Washington. He was one of Washington's two primary mounts during the American Revolutionary War. The horse was a half-Arabian, sired by the stallion "Ranger", also known as "Lindsay's Arabian", said to have been obtained from the Sultan of Morocco. Blueskin was a gift to Washington from Colonel Benjamin Tasker Dulany (c. 1752–1816) of Maryland. Dulany married Elizabeth French, a ward of Washington's, who gave her away at her wedding to Dulany on February 10, 1773.

Blueskin, due to his white hair coat, was the horse most often portrayed in artwork depicting Washington on a horse. Washington's other primary riding horse was Nelson, a chestnut gelding said to be calmer under fire than Blueskin. Both horses were retired after the Revolutionary War. Blueskin lived at Mount Vernon, until he was returned to Mrs. Dulany in November 1785 with the following note:

General Washington presents his best respects to Mrs Dulany with the horse blueskin; which he wishes was better worth her acceptance. Marks of antiquity have supplied the place of those beauties with which this horse abounded—in his better days. Nothing but the recollection of which, & of his having been the favourite of Mr Dulany in the days of his Court ship, can reconcile her to the meagre appearance he now makes.

== Prior to the Revolution ==
In addition to being the nation's first president renowned for his leadership during the Revolutionary War, George Washington was also known for initiating presidential pets. From the outset, George Washington valued the outdoors, his country home, his dogs and livestock. He also loved his fine horses and frequently took to speed contests. Before the Revolution, Washington attended various social events held at the races in Annapolis.

== Historical significance in the Revolution ==
Horses have become a valuable asset throughout military history. Effectively trained war horses became formidable enough to match the deadliness of their riders. In addition to physicality, they had considerable psychological impact on soldiers by boosting morale and courage, or instilling fear in the enemy. The impact of horses boosted the efficiency of militaries and their strategies. While horses are largely ignored in accounts of famous battles, they ultimately were a critical contribution to success, such as that of the American Revolution.

Washington's ability as a horseman allowed him to strengthen his cavalry's capabilities and heighten the image of the Americans. During the Revolutionary War, the colonists were highly underestimated and dismissed by their mother country. The British perceived the rebels as merely a restive mob of people without agency and "certainly not gentlemen of breeding." However, George Washington utterly transformed this preconceived notion of the colonists with his persona as a gentleman and gallant leader. His ability to command horses conveyed this impression even further, and was described by British officers that "he was a very impressive figure, both on horseback and off."

== Portrayals of Blueskin ==
Blueskin was a favorite of George Washington; due to his Arabian bloodline, the horse had "great endurance and could carry Washington " (who was said to be over six feet tall) "all day on the march or in battle." However, Washington preferred to ride his other horse, Nelson, in battle since Blueskin was prone to skittishness around gunfire and cannon blasts while Nelson was more composed in those circumstances. Though Blueskin did not see as much battle as Nelson, he is the horse who appears most frequently in paintings of George Washington as a general in the Revolution. Blueskin was preferred for portraits because of his white hair coat, as opposed to Nelson's chestnut coat. Grays are born darker, but adult hair coat often becomes pure white, and their skin is black, which can appear bluish in sunlight (thus the name).

It is uncertain whether any contemporary portraitists who painted George Washington with Blueskin had the horse standing as a subject (Peale and Faed certainly did not; Faed had never traveled to America). Author William Spohn Baker noted in 1880 that the horse in Faed's painting was said to have been done by British painter R. Ansdell. Trumbull was well acquainted with Washington, and although Washington sat for Trumbull a number of times, it is unknown whether Blueskin accompanied him. Other portraits are unlikely accurate representations of Blueskin; rather, pastiches borrowed from other paintings, such as David's equestrian portrait Napoleon Crossing the Alps. Judging from the Roman nose and rounded croup with a low tail set illustrated in these paintings, the opposite of traits associated with Arabian ancestry, the horse used as a model in some paintings was likely of Andalusian descent.

== Gallery ==
Additional paintings featuring Blueskin
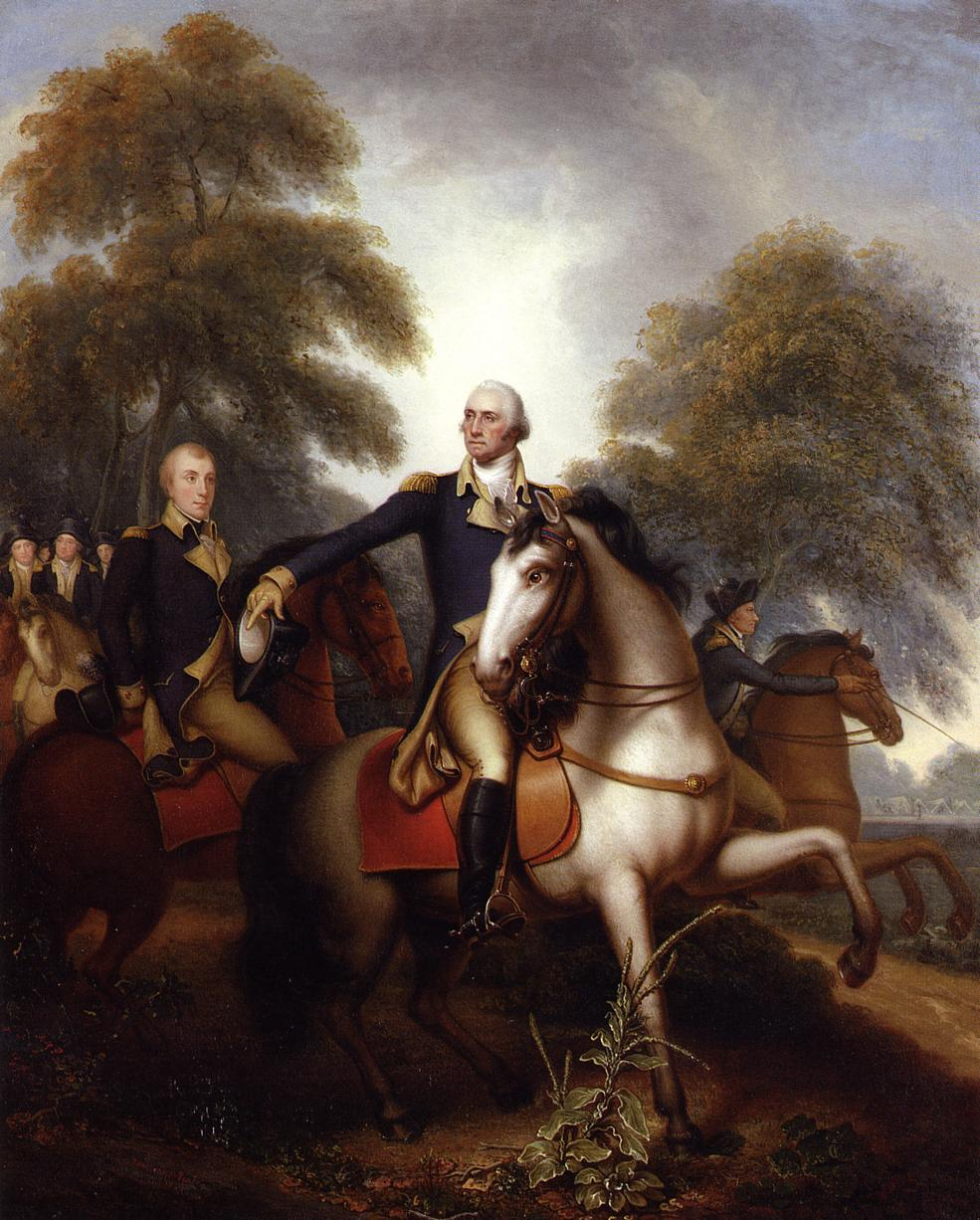
Washington Before Yorktown, life-size portrait by Rembrandt Peale; 1824, reworked 1825

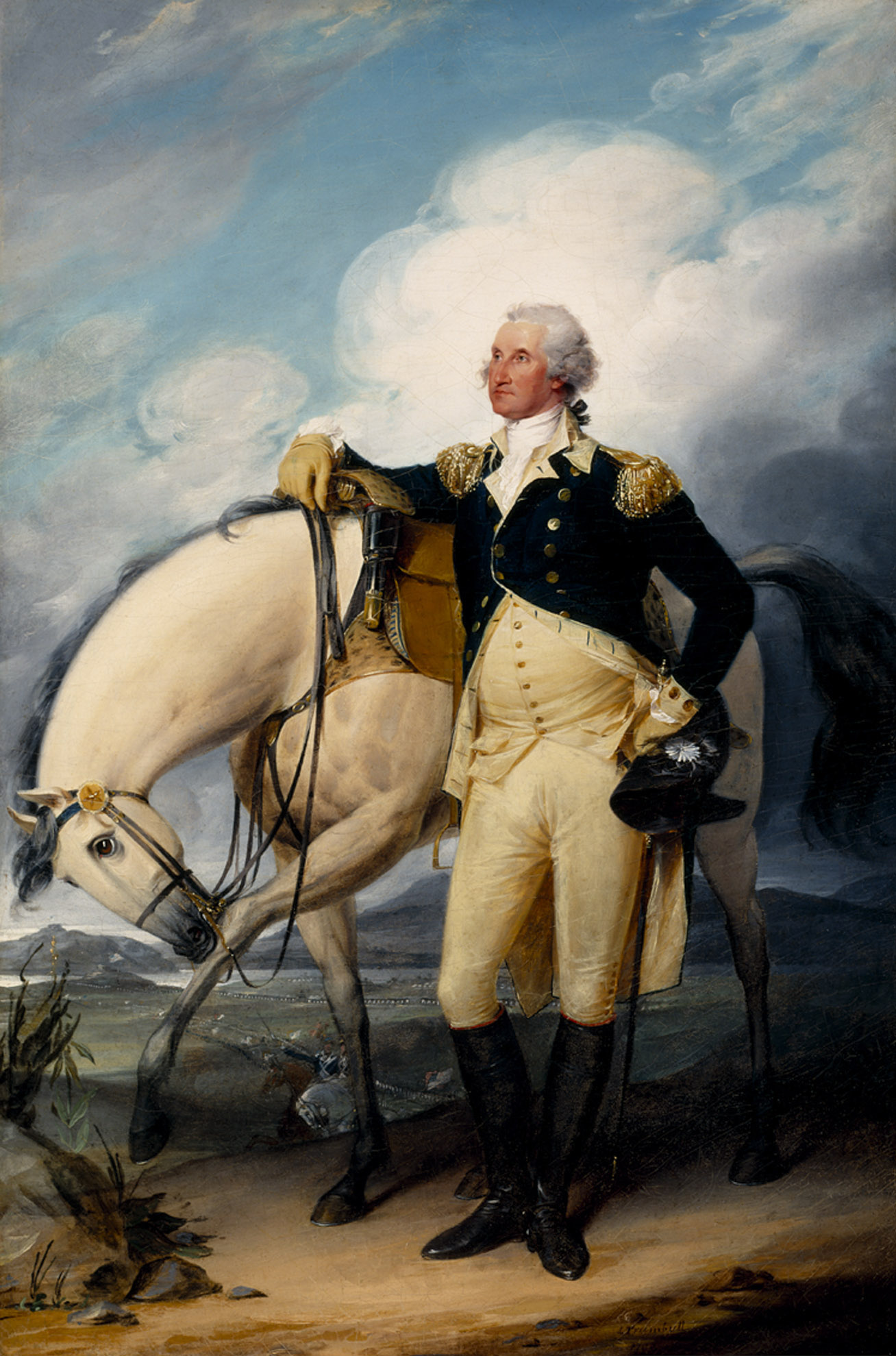
Washington at Verplanck's Point by John Trumbull, 1790

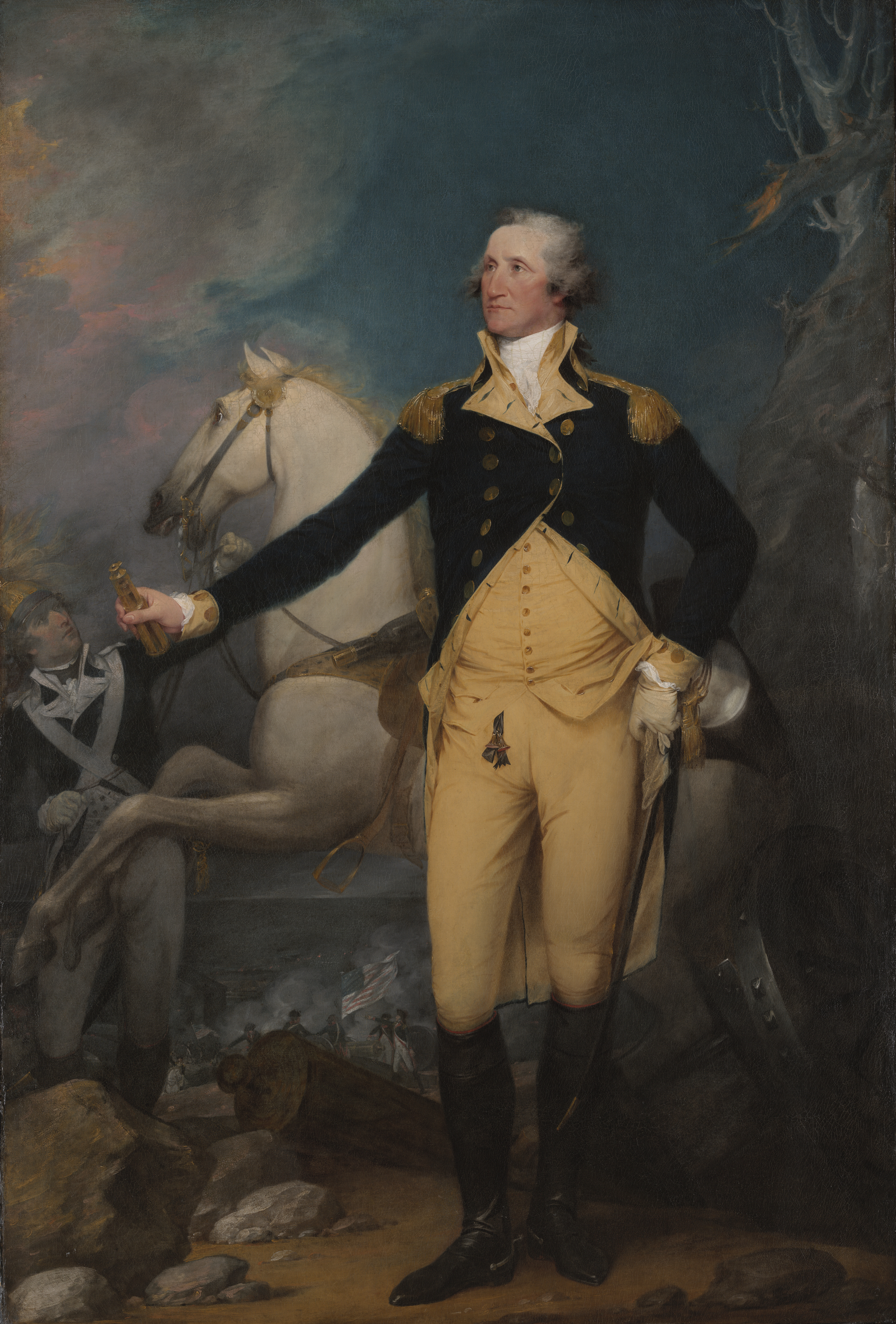
General George Washington at Trenton by John Trumbull, 1792

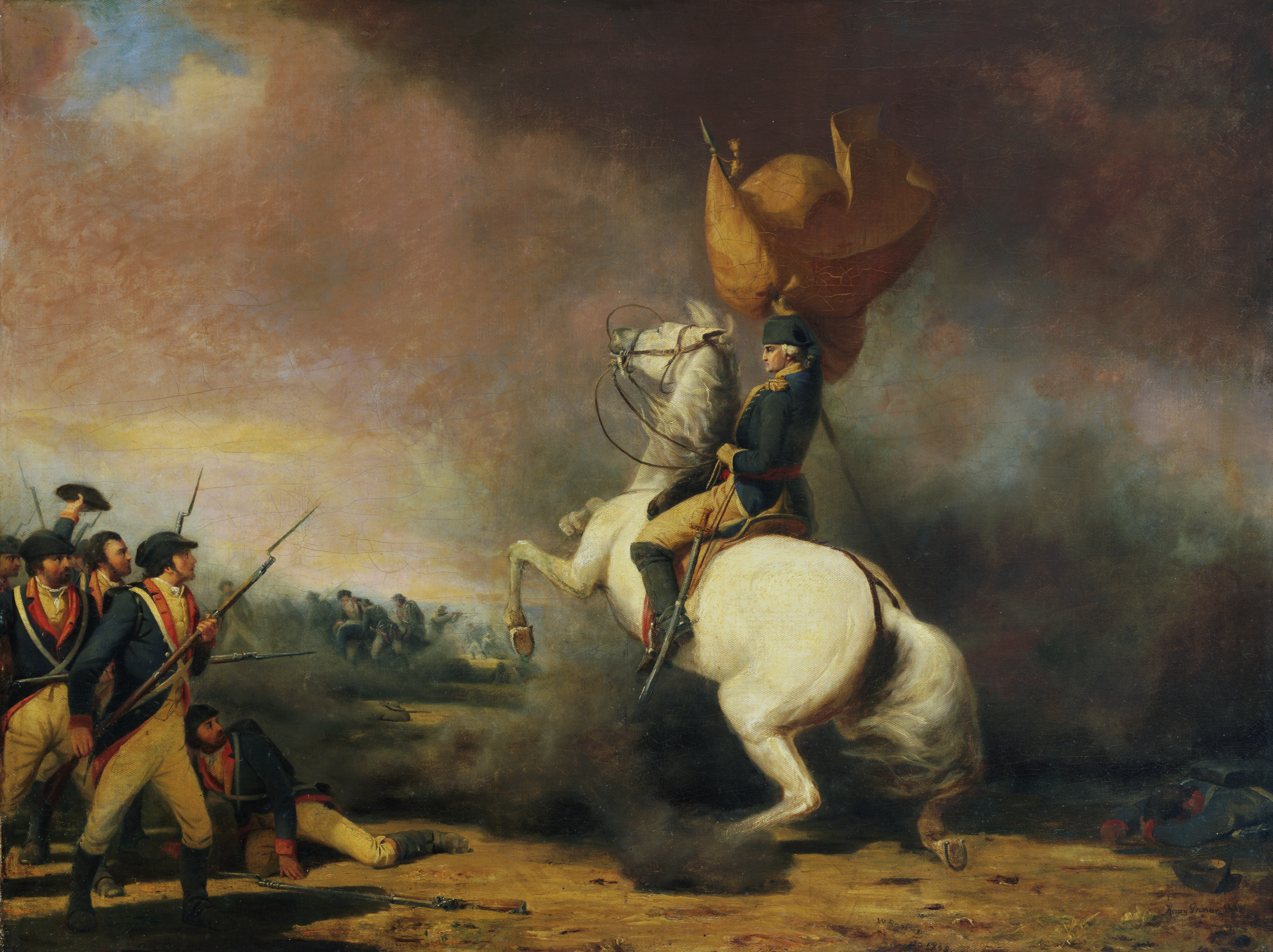
Washington Rallying the Americans at the Battle of Princeton by William Ranney, 1848

== See also ==
- List of historical horses
