= Portrait of George Washington Taking the Salute at Trenton =

1856 oil painting by John Faed

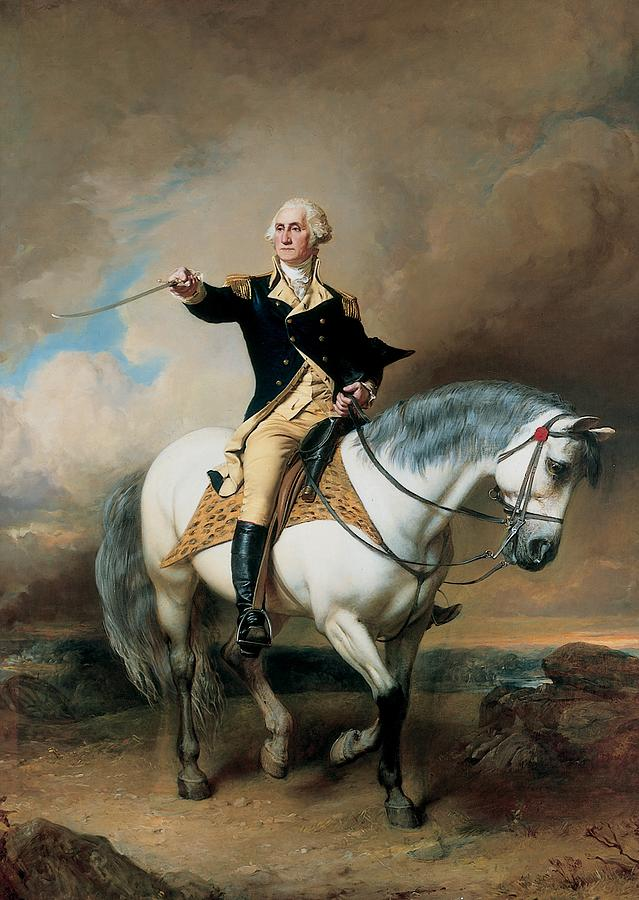
- Artist: John Faed
- Year: 1856
- Medium: oil on canvas
- Dimensions: 142.2 cm × 105.4 cm (56 in × 41 1/2 in)

The Portrait of George Washington Taking the Salute at Trenton is a large full-length oil on canvas painting by the Scottish artist John Faed depicting General George Washington on the battlefield at Trenton, New Jersey, during the American Revolutionary War. The equestrian portrait was the basis for the engraving Washington Receiving a Salute on the Field of Trenton by the British artist William Holl.

== History ==
John Faed (1819–1902) was a member of the Royal Scottish Academy. In 1856, the portrait was sold to the publisher James Keith for £200 (equivalent to £18,620 in 2025). According to biographer Mary McKerrow, "Why he painted this important posthumous equestrian portrait of George Washington Taking the Salute at Trenton has still to be discovered." According to the provenance provided by Christie's, the painting originated from a commission by Andrew Carnegie. It sold in 1969 for US$662,500 at Christie's auction house. By 1982, it was in the collection of St. Mary's Art Guild in Detroit, Michigan. In 1984 the painting was sold anonymously for US$43,000 by Sotheby's. The painting was on display at the Westervelt–Warner Museum of American Art, renamed the Tuscaloosa Museum of Art, created by Jack Warner to display his art collection. Washington was Warner's personal hero. The art museum closed in 2018.

== Description ==
General George Washington (1732–1799) is depicted in full military uniform, a blue coat over buff waistcoat and pants, riding on a white horse named Blueskin. There is a leopard-skin blanket under his saddle. He is holding a tricorner hat in his left hand and an outstretched sword in his right hand. The background shows a small group of military tents. The figure's head is based on the work of another painter, namely the Athenaeum Portrait of Washington by the American painter Gilbert Stuart (1755–1828). The painting is 142.2 centimeters (56.0 in) high and 105.4 centimeters (41.5 in) wide.

== Engraving ==
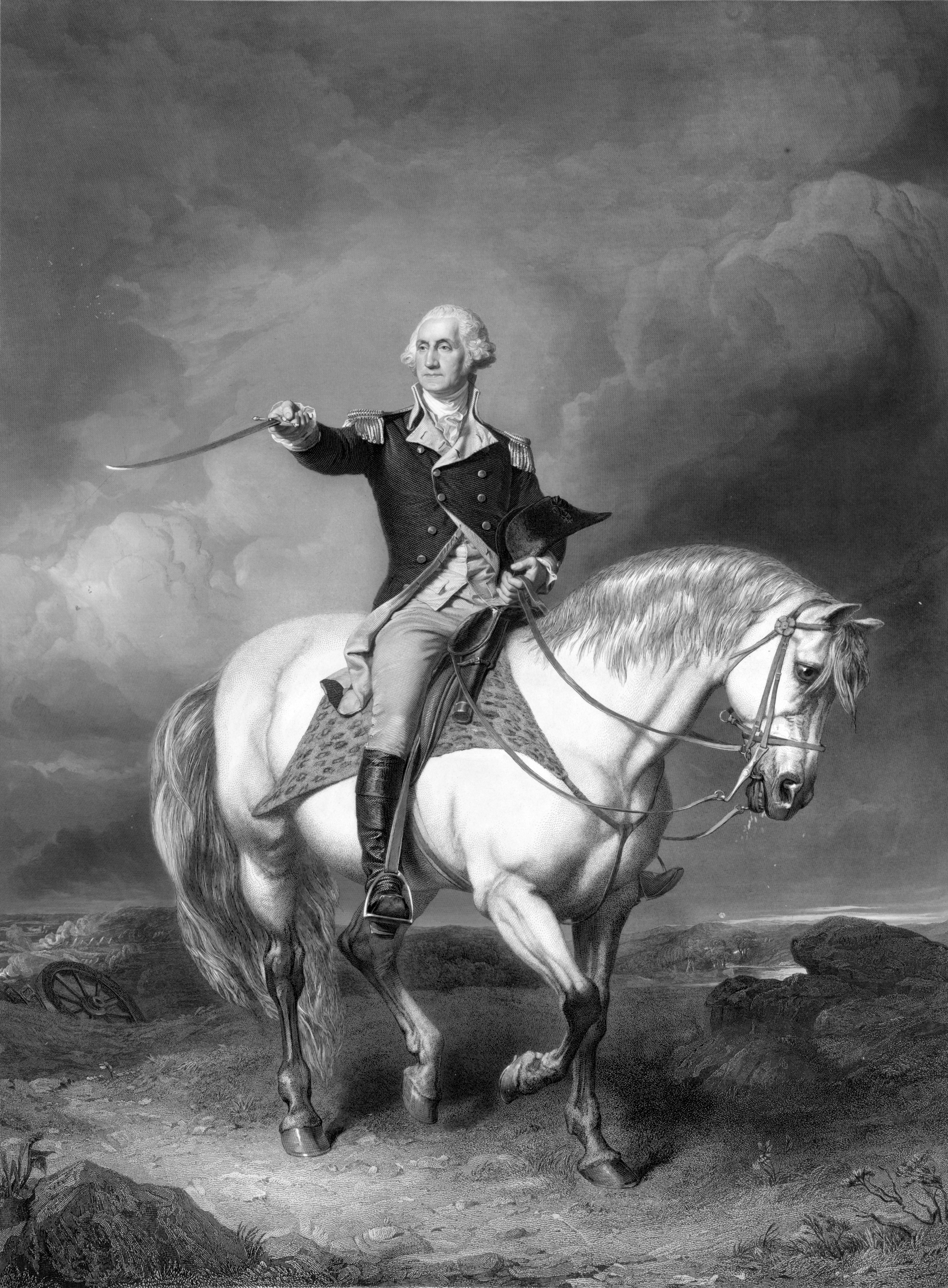
Washington Receiving a Salute on the Field of Trenton, engraving by William Holl (1865)

Washington Receiving a Salute on the Field of Trenton is an engraving by William Holl (1807–1871) based on Faed's equestrian portrait. In 1865, the National Art Association of New York published it exclusively for subscribers. The print is 24 inches (61 cm) high and 17 10/16 inches (44.8 cm) wide. The print was recommended for school use and seen in classrooms.

William Spohn Baker notes:

An admirable engraving, of an admirable picture. The horse, which is exceedingly well drawn, is said to have been painted by R. Ansdell, the composition of the picture being by Faed. Head after Stuart.

In 1866, an advertisement in the Herald of Health for this engraving stated:

This picture shows Washington on horseback, and when framed can not fail to prove a most interesting ornament to any parlor or sitting-room. Its influence upon the children of a house would be worth many times its cost in cultivating their tastes for fine works of art.

In 1880, his portrait bust engraving was used to illustrate an article on Washington in the Magazine of American History.

== Legacy ==
Shadows of Liberty (2016), by American contemporary painter Titus Kaphar, is a reimagined presentation of the painting.

== Gallery ==
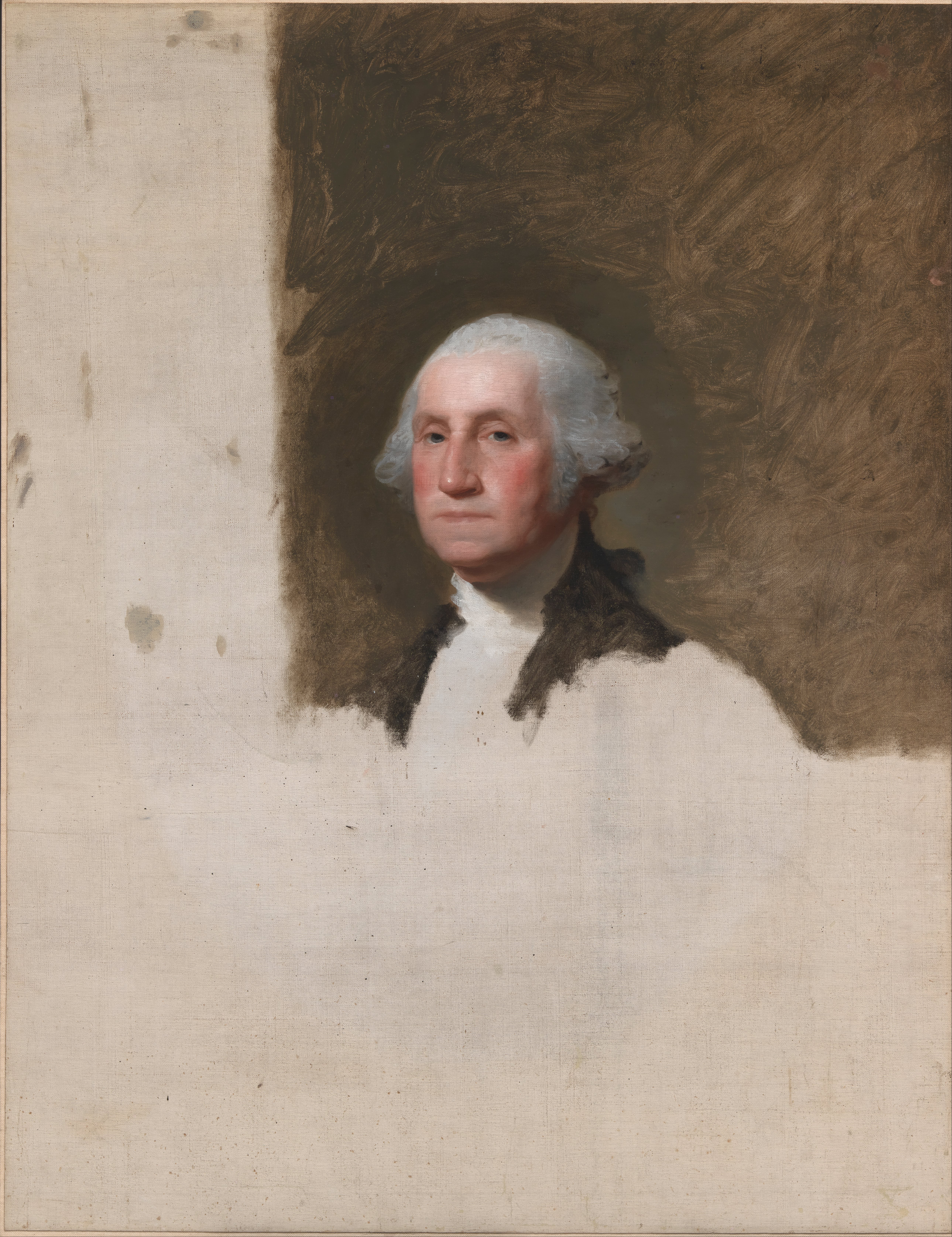
Athenaeum Portrait by Gilbert Stuart (1796)

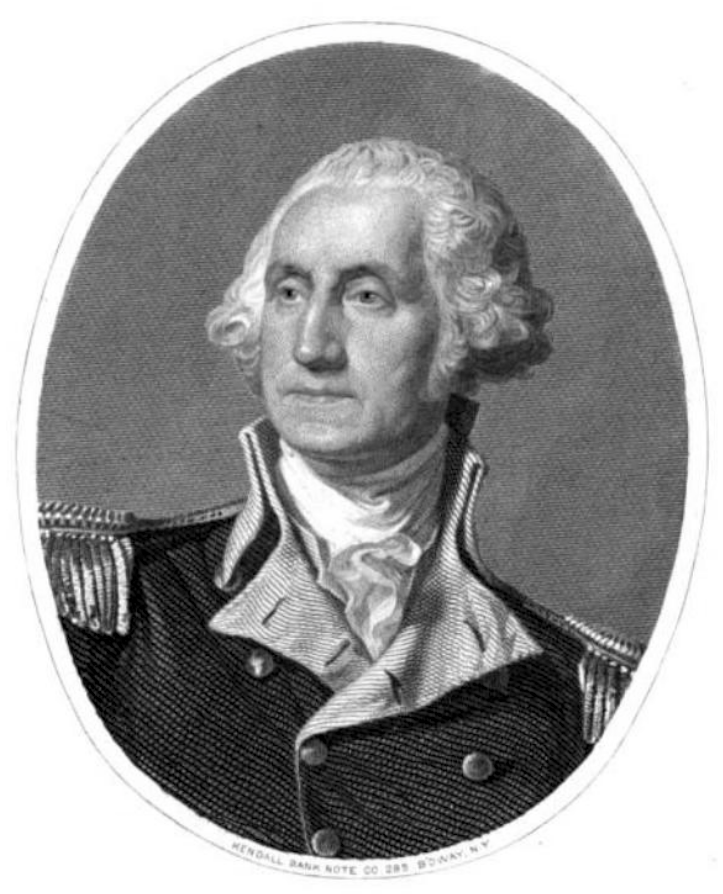
Portrait bust engraving by William Holl (1880)

== See also ==
- Battle of Trenton – also known as the First Battle of Trenton
- Battle of the Assunpink Creek – also known as the Second Battle of Trenton, fought one week later
- Blueskin – Washington's horse represented in the painting
- List of paintings of George Washington
- The Capture of the Hessians at Trenton, December 26, 1776 – the First Battle of Trenton, by John Trumbull
- General George Washington at Trenton – after the Second Battle of Trenton, by John Trumbull
