= Tuscaloosa Museum of Art =

Art musuem in Tuscaloosa, Alabama

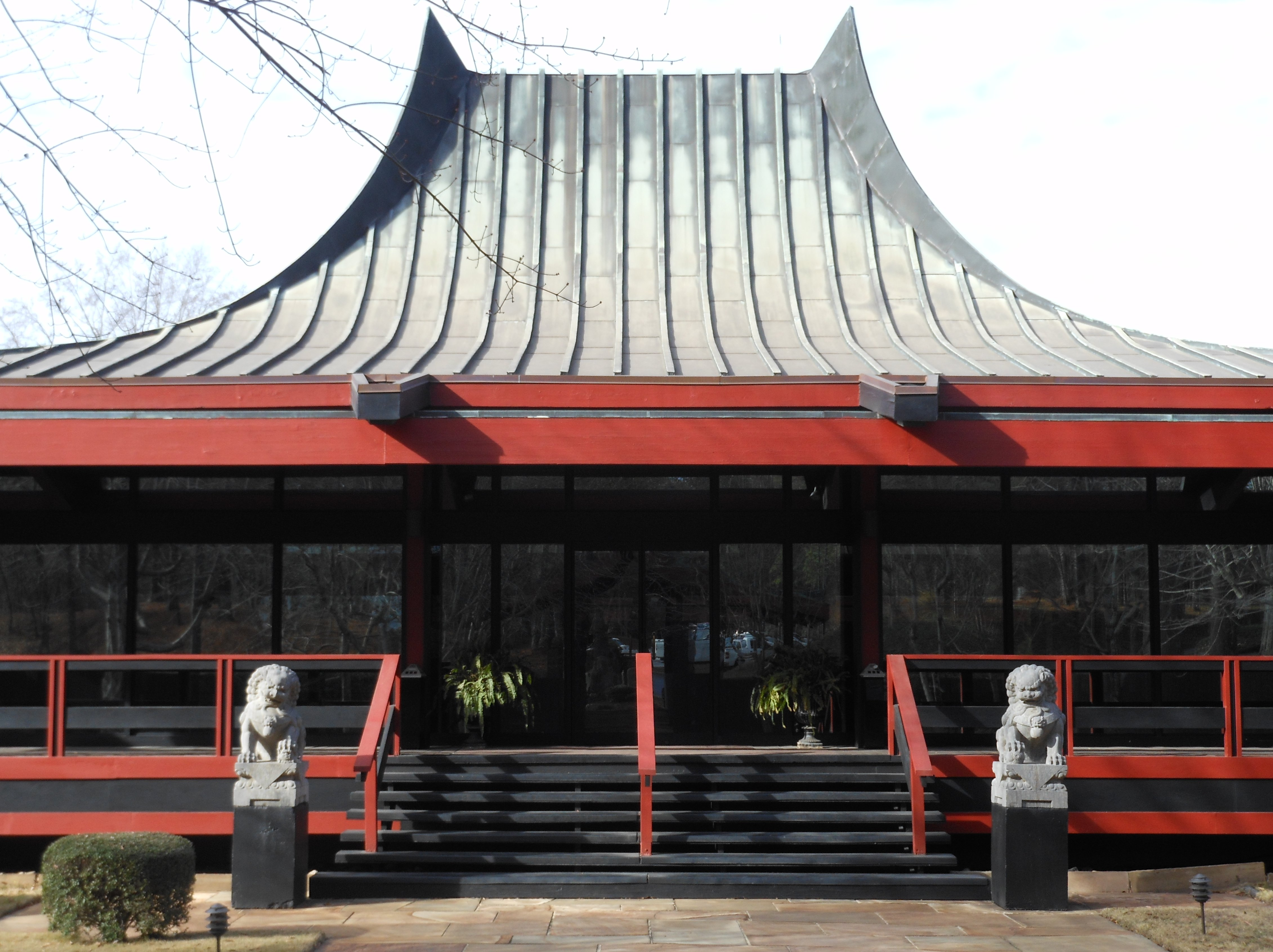
- Established: 2003 (as Westervelt-Warner Museum); 2011 (as Tuscaloosa Museum of Art)
- Dissolved: 2018
- Location: 1400 Jack Warner Parkway NE, Tuscaloosa, Alabama, USA
- Coordinates: 33°17′35″N 87°30′18″W
- Type: Art

The Tuscaloosa Museum of Art, previously the Westervelt-Warner Museum of American Art, was an art museum in Tuscaloosa, Alabama. It was founded by Tuscaloosa businessman Jack Warner. The museum permanently closed in 2018.

The Westervelt-Warner Museum of American Art was the result of 40 years of collecting American art by Jack Warner, CEO of Gulf States Paper, later the Westervelt Company. He founded the museum in 2003 after exhibiting portions of the collection in the headquarters building of the Westervelt Company.

The Westervelt-Warner collection contained more than 500 works from 1775 onwards. Artists represented included John Singer Sargent and Childe Hassam as well as several artists of importance to American art, including Albert Bierstadt, Rembrandt Peale, Edward Hicks, Thomas Moran, Edward Hopper, Robert Henri, Edward Potthast, and Charles Bird King. Other artists' works included James McNeill Whistler, Andrew Wyeth, Mary Cassatt, and James Peale. Warner collected several works about George Washington, his personal hero, including John Faed's Portrait of George Washington Taking the Salute at Trenton.

In 2011, the Westervelt-Warner Museum became the Tuscaloosa Museum of Art. In 2018, the Westervelt Company closed the museum, citing its “long-term strategy as a company”. Some of the art was to reside in the company's headquarters, while the rest was prepared for sale.

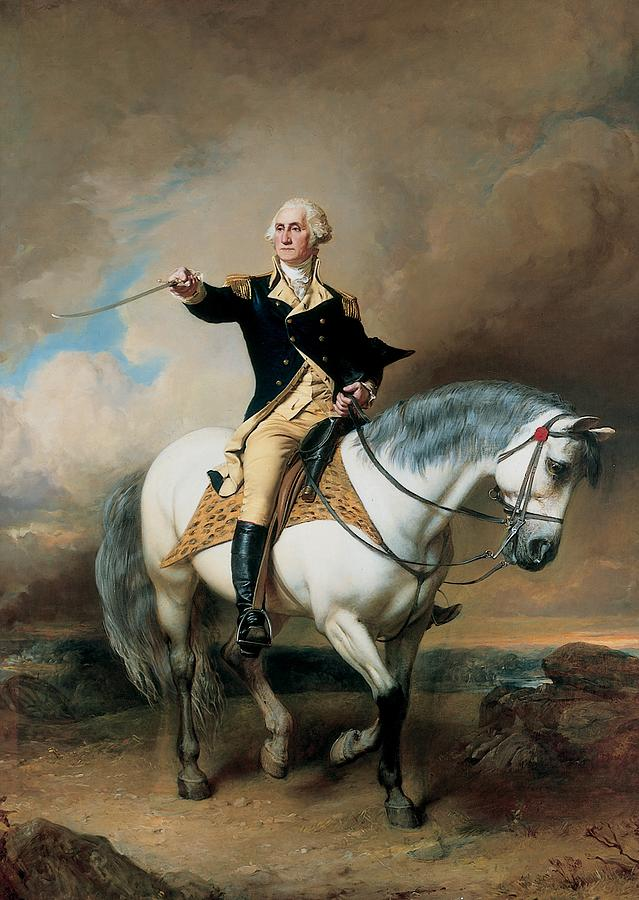
Portrait of George Washington Taking the Salute at Trenton by John Faed
