= Edinburgh Smashers Club =

The Smashers Club was a drawing club created in Edinburgh in 1848 by a small group of artists, almost all of whom went on to national fame and recognition.

The founding members were William Fettes Douglas, William Crawford, Thomas Faed, John Faed, James Archer and John Ballantyne. As all members lived in the Second New Town or nearby Comely Bank areas in Edinburgh, it is presumed they probably met in this area. Members refer to the club being akin to John Dowie's College, an affectionate name for a tavern in the Old Town which had been demolished three decades earlier but which had a reputation as a meeting place for the artistic community. This implies they met in a bar, but is unclear which one. The club name implies a degree of alcohol consumption.

In 1863, largely due to relocation of the members, the club removed to London and renamed itself the Auld Lang Syne Sketching Club: open to Scottish artists living in London. New members included Erskine Nicol, John Stirling, Andrew Maclure.
