= James Paterson (journalist) =

Scottish journalist

James Paterson (18 May 1805 – 6 May 1876) was a Scottish journalist on numerous newspapers, writer and antiquary. His works are popular history, rather than scholarly.

== Life ==
He was the son of James Paterson, farmer at Struthers, Ayrshire, where he was born on 18 May 1805; his father then had money troubles and gave up his farm. Paterson received an education, and then was apprenticed to a printer at the office of the Kilmarnock Mirror. Subsequently he was transferred to the Courier office in Ayr.

On completing his apprenticeship, Paterson went to Glasgow, where he joined the Scots Times. In 1826 he returned to Kilmarnock, took a shop as stationer and printer, and in partnership with other gentlemen started the Kilmarnock Chronicle. Its first number appeared on 4 May 1831, during the agitation for the Great Reform Bill, and the paper closed in May 1832.

In 1835 Paterson left Kilmarnock for Dublin, where for some time he acted as correspondent of the Glasgow Liberator. He went to Edinburgh, and ultimately found employment at a small salary in writing the letterpress for John Kay's Edinburgh Portraits, 1837–9, most of the biographies being his work. Failing to find further employment in Edinburgh, he accepted in 1839 the editorship of the Ayr Observer; but his prospects there were not good, and he returned to Edinburgh, where he supported himself by writing.

About 1871 Paterson was attacked by paralysis, and he died on 6 May 1876.

== Works ==
Aged 12, Paterson began to contribute to George Thomson's miscellany. In 1840 he published Contemporaries of Burns and the more recent Poets of Ayrshire, and in 1847 a History of the County of Ayr. In 1871 he published Autobiographical Reminiscences. The Ballads and Songs of Ayrshire, which he edited, appeared in 1847.

Paterson's other publications were:

- The Obit of the Church of St. John the Baptist at Ayr, with a translation and historical sketch, 1848.
- The Poems of the Sempills of Beltrees, with notes, 1849.
- The Poems of William Hamilton of Bangour, with a life of the poet William Hamilton, 1850.
- Memoir of James Fillans, Sculptor, 1854.
- Origin of the Scots and of the Scottish Language, 1855; 2nd ed. 1858.
- History of the Regality of Musselburgh, 1857.
- Wallace and his Times, 1858, and subsequent editions.
- The Life and Poems of William Dunbar, 1860.
- Notes to Archibald Crawfurd's The Huntly Casket and other Tales and Lyrics; with Reminiscences of the Author, 1861.
- James the Fifth, or the Gudeman of Ballengich, his Poetry and Adventures, 1861.
- The History of the Counties of Ayr and Wigton, 1863.
- A Contribution to Historical Genealogy: The Breadalbane Succession Case—how it arose and how it stands, 1863.

Paterson also played some part in the production of Peter Handyside M'Kerlie's History of the Lands and their Owners in Galloway (1870). He had a dispute with the author.
