= Archibald Crawfurd =

Scottish poet (1785–1843)

- Born: 1785; Ayr, Scotland
- Died: 6 January 1843 (aged 57–58); Ayr, Scotland
- Occupations: Poet, writer, auctioneer, businessman
- Known for: Scottish poet, editor and contributor to local periodicals; author of *Bonnie Mary Hay* and *Tales of My Grandmother*
- Spouse: Catherine Craig

Archibald Crawfurd (1785–1843) was a Scottish poet.

== Life ==
Crawfurd was born in Ayr, and was left an orphan at the age of eight. After some school education he went, aged 12, to London to learn the trade of baker with his sister's husband. After eight years' he returned to Ayr, and at age 22 attended writing classes of Ayr academy for three months. He was for some time employed in the Edinburgh house of Charles Hay, after which he obtained an engagement in the family of General Alexander Leith Hay of Rannes.

Returning to Ayr in 1811, Crawfurd went into business as a grocer. He then became an auctioneer, and also took a small shop for the sale of furniture. Around 1825 he with friends launched a weekly periodical in Ayr, The Correspondent. The founders fell out, and Crawfurd then edited The Gaberlunzie, which lasted for sixteen numbers.

Crawfurd died in Ayr on 6 January 1843.

== Works ==
In honour of General Hay's daughter, who had nursed him through typhus fever, Crawfurd composed the song Bonnie Mary Hay. It originally appeared in the Ayr and Wigtownshire Courier. Robert Archibald Smith set it to music.

Crawford in 1819 published anonymously St. James's in an Uproar, a political satire and skit on local figures, which caused a furore. In Ayr alone 3,000 copies were sold, and the printer was arrested. In the same year Crawford began to contribute to the Ayr and Wigtownshire Courier, in prose and verse. A series of sketches founded on traditions in the west of Scotland were published by subscription in 1824 as Tales of My Grandmother, enlarged edition in two volumes by Archibald Constable & Co. in 1825.

To The Gaberlunzie Crawfurd contributed tales and poems, including Scotland, I have no home but thee which was set to music. In his later years he contributed articles in prose and verse to the Ayr Advertiser. In 1861 James Paterson edited and annotated his works as The Huntly Casket, and other Tales and Lyrics; with Reminiscences of the Author.

== Family ==
He was married to Catherine Craig. Their second son was the artist William Crawford (sic).

== Notes ==
Attribution

This article incorporates text from a publication now in the public domain: Stephen, Leslie, ed. (1888). "Crawfurd, Archibald". Dictionary of National Biography. Vol. 13. London: Smith, Elder & Co.
