= Nelson (horse) =

George Washington's horse

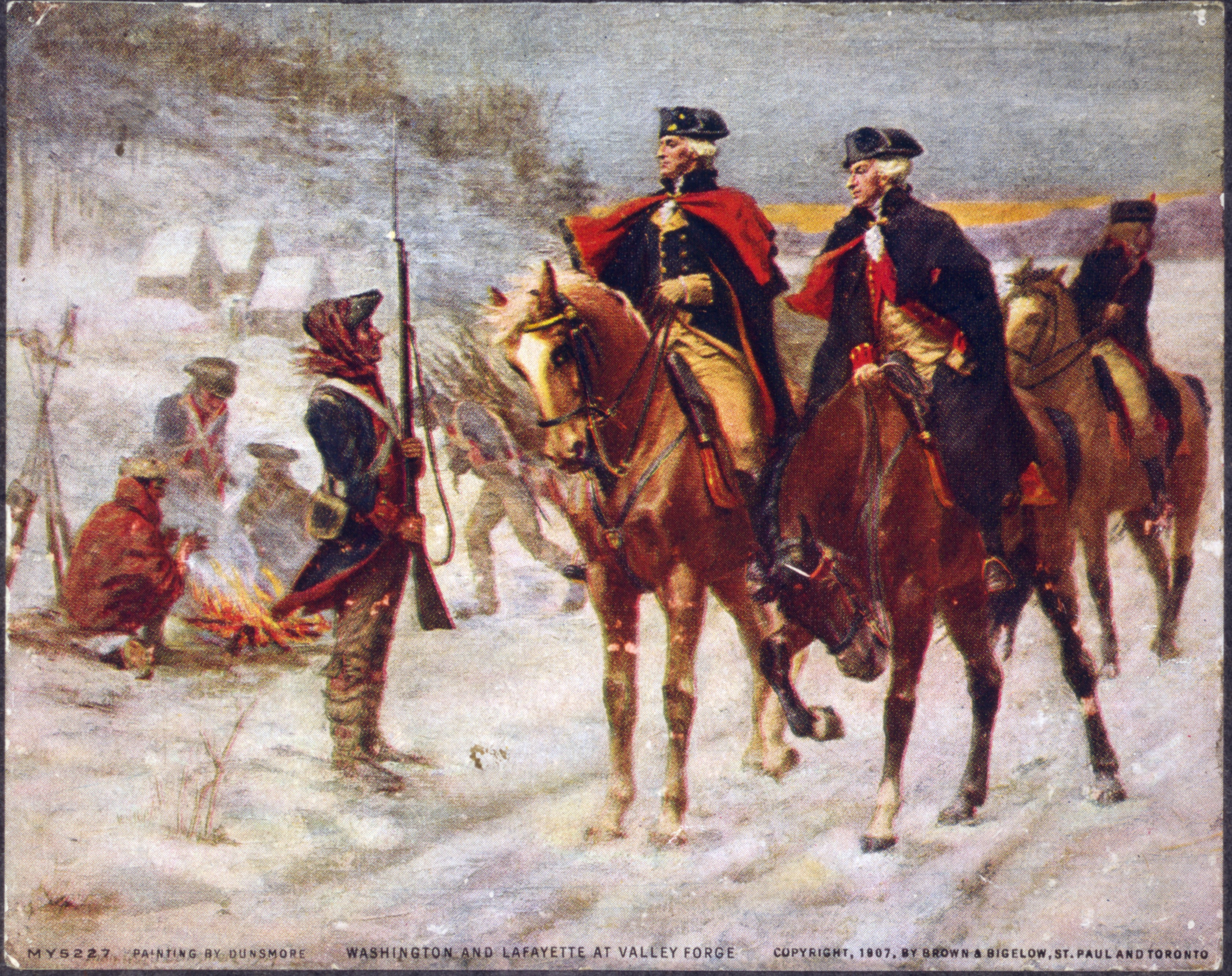
Washington riding Nelson (left); Washington and Lafayette at Valley Forge, John Ward Dunsmore

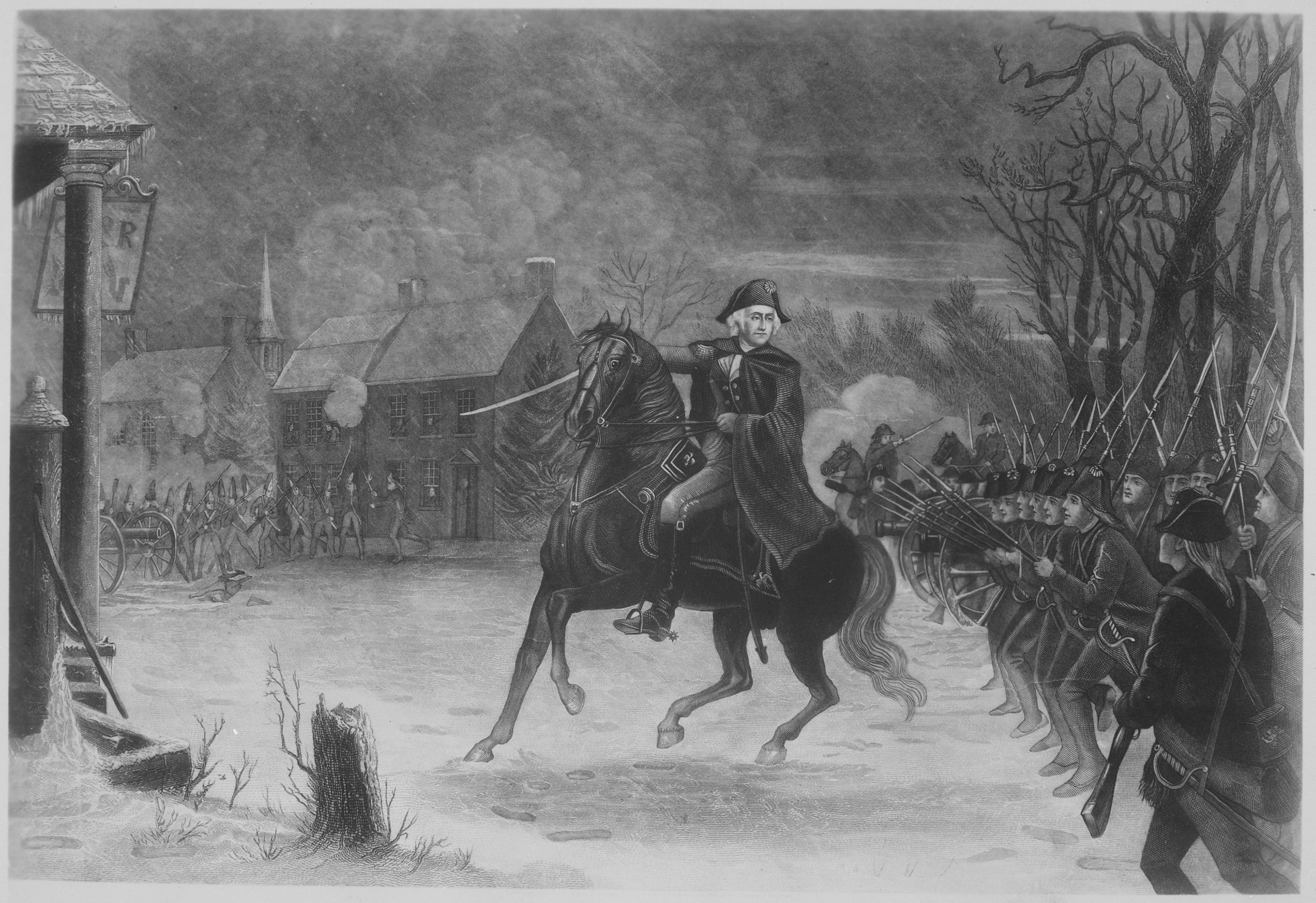
Washington at the Battle of Trenton, shown on Nelson; engraving after a painting by Edward Lamson Henry

Nelson or Old Nelson (1763–1790) was one of several horses owned by George Washington. He stood sixteen hands high and was a chestnut with a white blaze and white feet. The horse was acquired by Washington in 1779 at about the age of 15, and died in 1790 at about the age of 27, quite old for a horse in that era. Washington was known for being a skilled horse rider, as one of his friends the Marquis de Chastellux observed, remarking that Washington “is a very excellent and bold horseman, leaping the highest fences, and going extremely quick, without standing upon his stirrups, bearing on the bridle, or letting his horse run wild.” Nelson was a significant icon for a number of years, being one of Washington's favorite horses and was described by many as a "splendid charger".

== History ==
Nelson was foaled in 1763 and was given to Washington in 1778 by Thomas Nelson as a gift after Nelson had heard Washington was having trouble finding a replacement for his previous horse. Washington then named the horse Nelson as a gesture of appreciation and thanks toward Thomas Nelson. Nelson described the horse as being in prime condition, stating that "his value cannot be ascertain'd. He is now nine years old and of excellent qualities". Washington stated that Nelson was his most favored horse to use during battle situations such as the Revolutionary War. This is due to the fact that Nelson was not as easily provoked by the sudden, loud noises often experienced during battle such as gunfire compared to Washington's other horse, Blueskin, who was much more skittish. For this reason, Washington rode Nelson into a majority of Revolutionary War battles and events, including Cornwallis' surrender at Yorktown. The other horse he rode during the Revolutionary War, and on whom he is more often portrayed, was his gray horse, Blueskin.

Washington ceased to ride Nelson or Blueskin after the war, as both horses survived unharmed. After the war, Washington retired Nelson and Blueskin to Mount Vernon where the two horses lived a life of ease and comfort. However, unlike many other wealthy horse owners, Washington would regularly check on his horses and ensure they were being tended to properly Washington would visit Nelson's paddock often, where it was reported that "the old war-horse would run, neighing, to the fence, proud to be caressed by the great master's hands."

== See also ==
- United States presidential pets
- List of historical horses
