= Faed Mustafa =

Palestinian diplomat (born 1965)

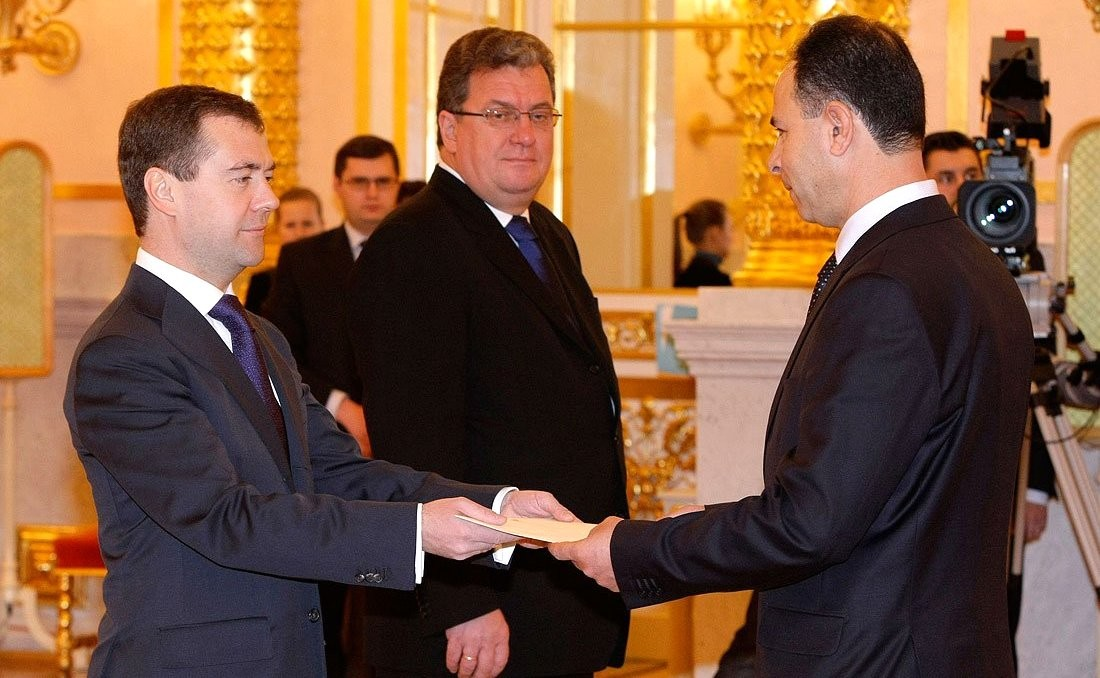

Palestine Ambassador to Russia
- In office 16 December 2009 – 28 May 2015
- Preceded by: Afif Safieh
- Succeeded by: Abdel Hafiz Nofal

Palestine Ambassador to Turkey
- Incumbent
- Assumed office 17 June 2015
- Preceded by: Nabil Maarouf

Personal details
- Born: 23 July 1965 (age 61) Deir Ballut, Palestine

Faed Mustafa (sometimes Fayed Mustafa; born 23 July 1965) is a Palestinian diplomat and current ambassador of Palestine to Turkey, presenting his credentials to Turkish president Recep Tayyip Erdoğan on 17 June 2015.

He was formerly Ambassador of Palestine to Russia, presenting his credentials to Russian president Dmitry Medvedev on 16 December 2009, and departing Russia on 28 May 2015. Prior to his appointment as Ambassador, he had served for 11 years in the Moscow embassy in various positions.

In 2010, Mustafa called for the reestablishment of the 1967 borders between Israel and the Palestinian territories.

== Biography ==
He was born in Deir Ballut, Salfit Governorate, West Bank in 1965. He holds a Bachelor of Science degree in Economics and Management Sciences from Yarmouk University, Jordan (1987). In 2001 he received a Master of Arts degree in History from the Peoples' Friendship University of Russia in Moscow and in 2005 a PhD in International Relations and Foreign Policy from the same institution.

In 1994, he began working for the Palestinian Authority, joining the embassy in Russia in 1998. There he held various positions, including consul in 2003 and deputy ambassador in 2008. On June 28, 2009, he was appointed Assistant Minister for Eastern Europe at the Palestinian Ministry of Foreign Affairs with the rank of ambassador. He was then appointed ambassador to Moscow, presenting his credentials to Russian President Dmitry Medvedev on December 16, 2009. He left the post in May 2015 upon being appointed ambassador to Turkey. He presented his credentials to Turkish President Recep Tayyip Erdoğan on June 17, 2015.

Regarding his personal life, he is married to Kifah Mustafa. He has three children: one son and two daughters.
