= Susan Faed =

Scottish artist (1827–1909)

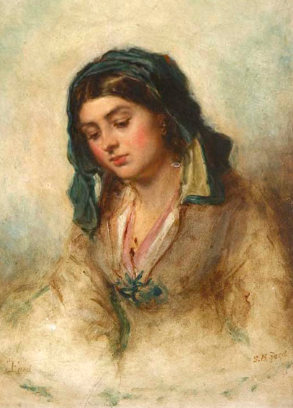
Susan Faed by Thomas Faed c.1850

Susan Bell Faed (1827–1909) was a Scottish artist, and the sister of three renowned artists: Thomas Faed, John Faed and James Faed. She was a frequent sitter for all three brothers.

== Life ==
Susan was born on 8 June 1827 the only daughter of the six children of James Faed (1777-1842), a tenant farmer at Barlay Mill in Girthon parish, near Gatehouse of Fleet, Galloway, and his wife Mary McGeoch (1790-1866).

Following the death of her father in 1842, Susan and her mother, and younger brother George, moved to Edinburgh. As they do not appear on independent registers it is logical to presume they lived with the eldest brother, John Faed. He lived in a very large Georgian house at 6 SW Circus Place in the Stockbridge district. They appear on the 1851 census but some time in the 1850s, following the death of George in 1852, she returned to Gatehouse of Fleet with her mother., probably to live with an uncle. They lived at Fleet Bank - a house viewing onto the Water of Fleet.

A competent artist she exhibited at the Royal Scottish Academy from 1867 to 1899.

In 1868 she joined her brother Thomas in London probably following the death of her mother (1866).

From 1897 until her death in 1909 she lived at Ardmore near Gatehouse.

From the summer of 1902 until his death in October of that year she cared for her brother John and he was buried at Girthon churchyard.

Susan died at Ardmore on 19 May 1909 and is buried in Girthon churchyard with her brother John (grave B126).

The Faed home, Barclay Mill, survives and is a listed building.

== Family ==
She was only briefly married. in 1887 aged 59 she married John Walthew JP of Wood Hall, Stockport, a widower. She lived with him two years before he died. They had no children.
