= James Archer (artist) =

Scottish painter (1823–1904)

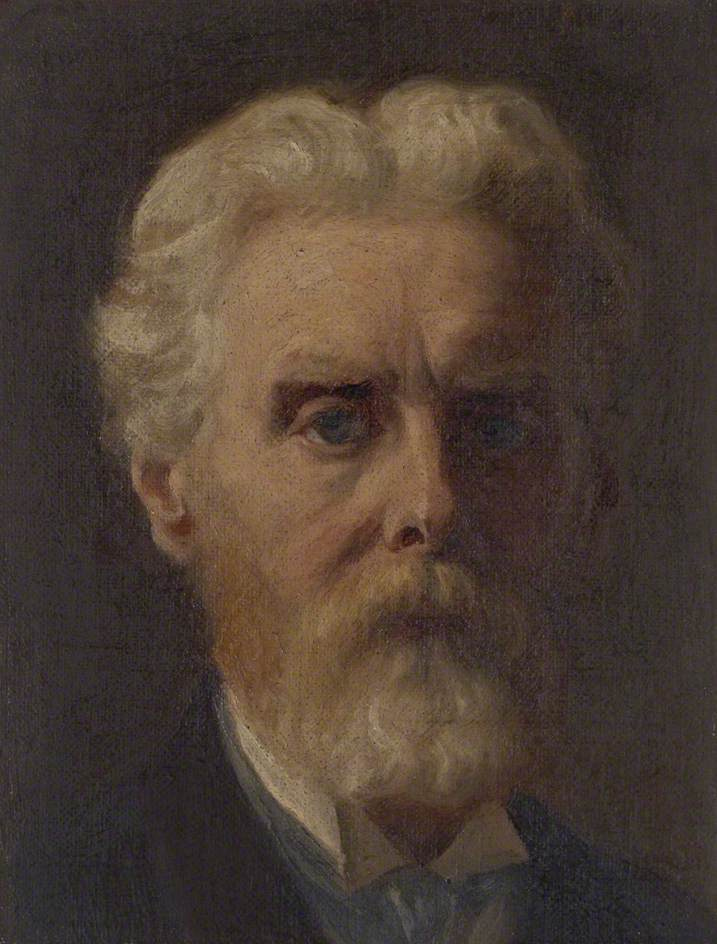
- James Archer, 1823–1904. Artist (Self-portrait) About 1890–1900
- Born: 10 June 1823; Edinburgh
- Died: 3 September 1904 (aged 81); Haslemere

James Archer RSA (10 June 1823 – 3 September 1904), was a Scottish painter of portraits, genre works, landscapes and historical scenes.

== Life ==
James Archer was born in Edinburgh, the first of four children to Andrew Archer, a dentist, and his wife, Ann Cunningham Gregory. His sister was Georgina Archer who founded an early college for women in Germany. The family lived at 25 Hanover Street in the First New Town, close to Princes Street.

He was educated at the Royal High School and studied at the Trustee's Academy in Edinburgh under Sir William Allan and Thomas Duncan (painter). In 1840, he was accepted as a student at the Royal Scottish Academy and first exhibited there in 1842, with the biblical painting, "The Child St John in the Wilderness". He became an associate of the academy in 1850, and in 1858 an Academician (RSA).

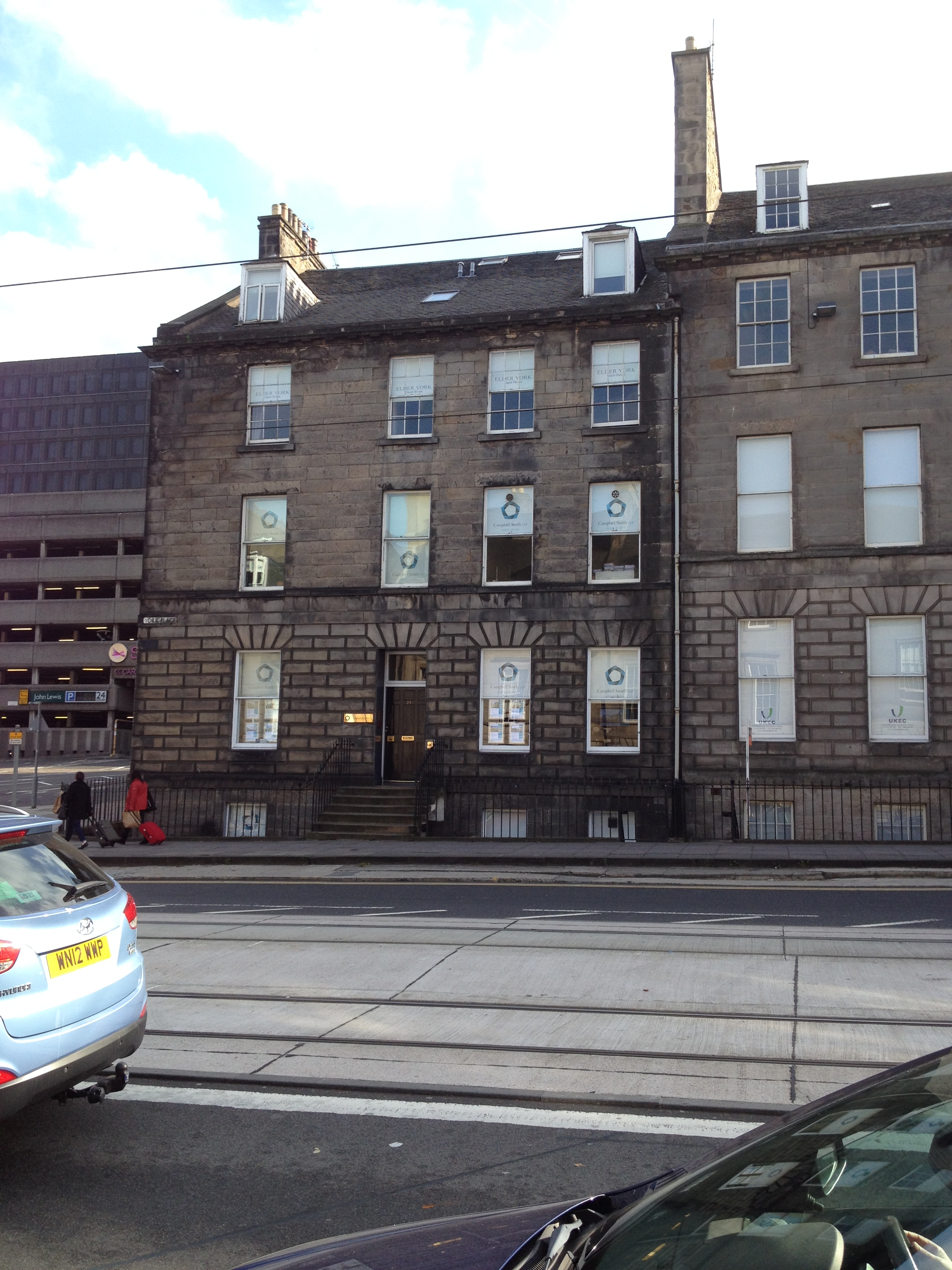
21 York Place in 2015

In 1844, he was listed as living at 21 York Place in Edinburgh's New Town. In 1848, he joined the Edinburgh Smashers Club: a sketching club (which probably also involved alcohol).

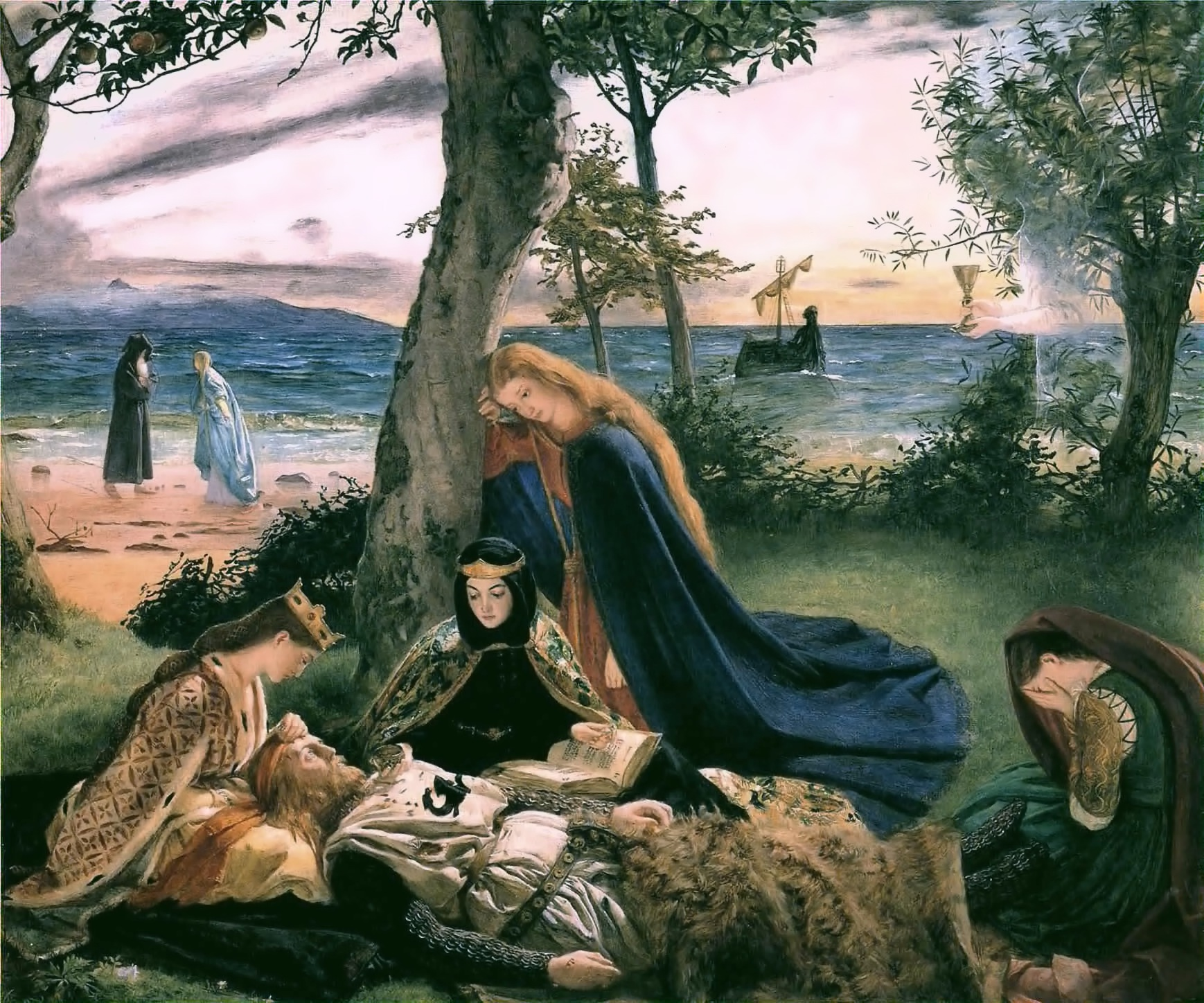
The Death of King Arthur, c. 1860

Archer worked in oils, pencil and chalk, and at the beginning of his career specialised in portraiture, his best-known work includes children and people in costume as its subjects - in fact, he was the first Victorian painter to do children's portraits in period costume. In 1849 he exhibited his first historical picture 'The Last Supper' at the Royal Scottish Academy. His work after that mostly consisted of scenes taken from literature or legends that were popular at the time, such as Shakespeare and King Arthur. In about 1859 he began to paint a series of brooding Arthurian subjects, including several versions of La Mort d'Arthur, which depict a melancholy Lancelot on horseback, being led out of the frame to his death by a hooded Merlin, as well as Sir Lancelot and Queen Guinevere.

In 1864, he moved to London, living at 21 Phillimore Gardens, moving in 1882 to 7 Cromwell Place. In the 1880s, Archer travelled to the United States, where he painted Andrew Carnegie's portrait, and to India, where he painted landscapes and people in costume.

Archer died on 3 September 1904 in Haslemere in Surrey. He was buried in the churchyard at Haslemere.

== Family ==
In 1853 he married Jane Clerk Lawson, daughter of the Edinburgh lawyer James Lawson WS of 4 Malta Terrace in the Stockbridge district. At the time of his death he had one son and three daughters.

== Works ==
Archer mainly worked on historical and religious scenes of a figurative nature. He received multiple commissions for portraits. Notable subjects include Andrew Carnegie, James G. Blaine, Lady Dufferin, Lord Dalhousie, Sir George Trevelyan, 2nd Baronet, John Stuart Blackie, Sir Henry Irving, Edwin Arnold, and Daniel Macnee.
