= William Spohn Baker =

American writer, collector, and title examiner

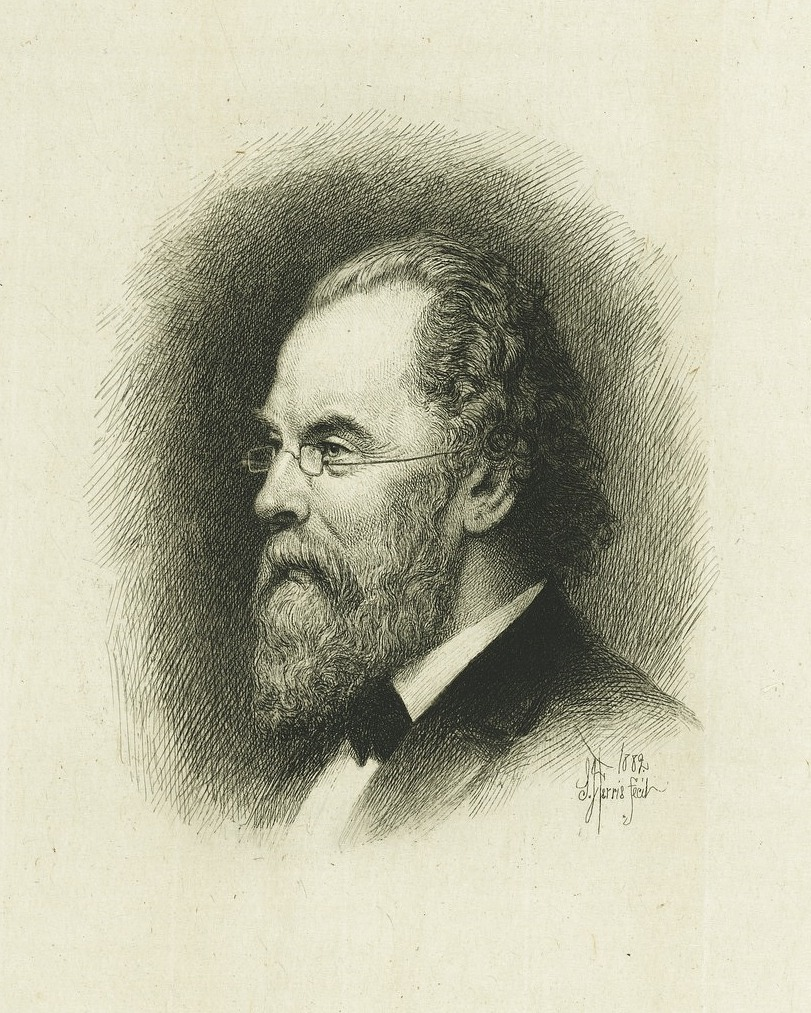
- Born: April 17, 1824; Philadelphia, Pennsylvania, U.S.
- Died: September 8, 1897 (aged 73)

William Spohn Baker (April 17, 1824 – September 8, 1897) was an American writer, collector and title examiner.

== Biography ==
William Spohn Baker born in Philadelphia on April 17, 1824, the son of George Nice Baker (1788–1859), a prominent member of Philadelphia city affairs, and Ann Keyser (1792–1867).

Baker was educated in private schools in Philadelphia. He then studied conveyancing under Andrew D. Cash while working in his office. Since 1873, Baker was a member of the Historical Society of Pennsylvania. He was elected to the Council of the Society in 1885 and became a vice president.

Baker married Eliza Downing on May 12, 1853. They had a daughter, Laura Baker (later Whelen). He died at his home on Arch Street in Philadelphia on September 8, 1897.
