= James Faed =

Scottish painter and engraver (1821–1911)

James Faed (4 April 1821 – 23 September 1911) was one of three famous Scottish brother painters/artists.

== Early life ==
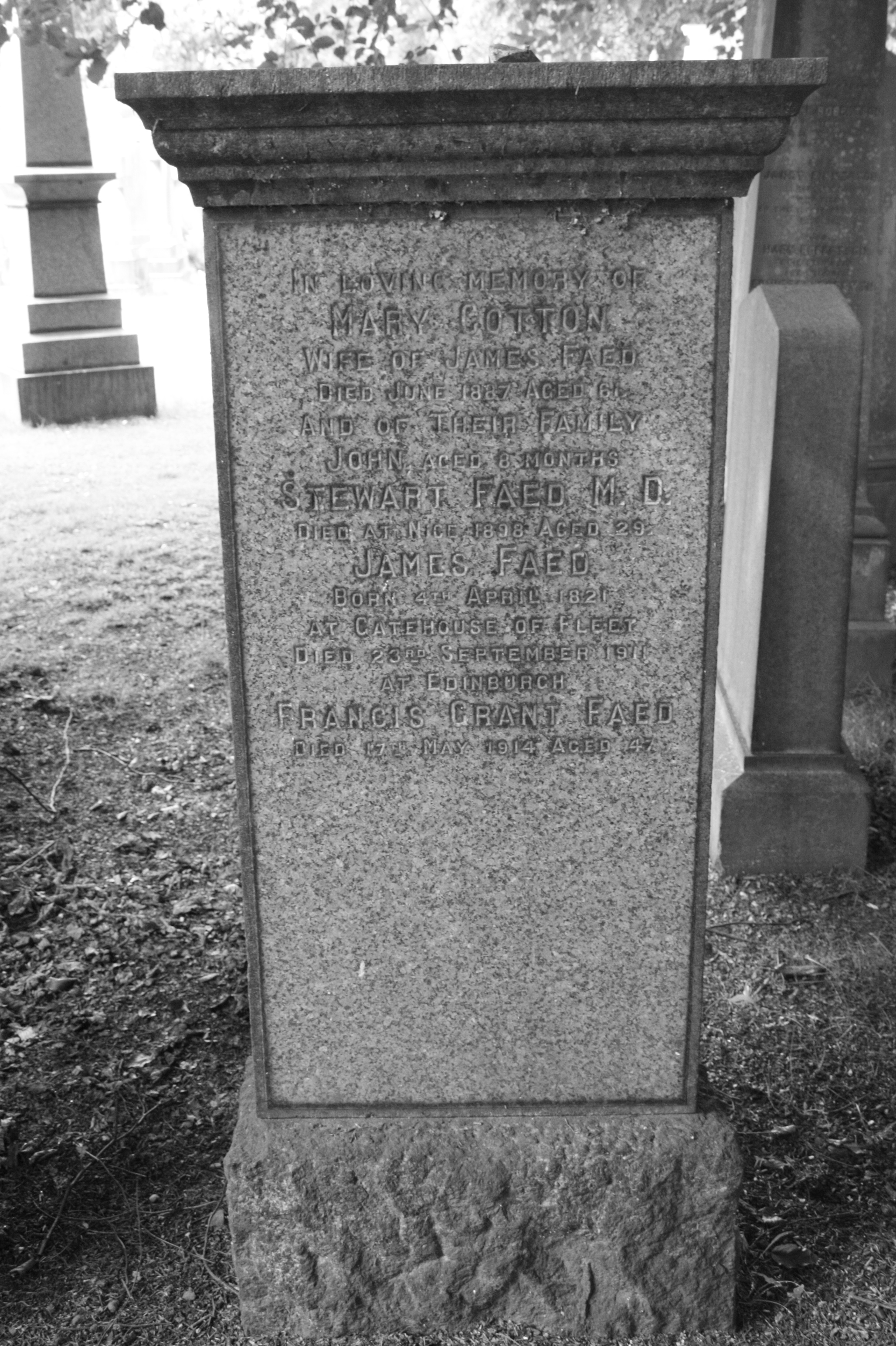
The grave of James Faed, Dean Cemetery

James was the second son of the six children of James Faed, tenant of Barlay Mill, near Gatehouse of Fleet, Galloway, and Mary née McGeoch. Two of his brothers, John and Thomas and his son James Faed, Jnr. also became artists.

In his early years his father thought James had a marked talent for engineering. When he was sixteen he built a dinghy in one of the outhouses at Barlay Mill, taking him a year. At seventeen he went to Maryport with his father and brother John. While John was painting miniatures, James did the same work as his father's men.

== Painter ==
However, with his father's death in 1842 and his work at Barlay Mill virtually at an end, in 1846 James joined his two brothers, John and Thomas, who were living at 6 South West Circus Place in Edinburgh. James began to paint fine landscapes, miniatures, and portraits in oils and watercolours and became a regular exhibitor at the Royal Scottish Academy for twenty years. His watercolour Coast Scene on the Colvend Coast is in the Aberdeen Art Gallery. Two of his miniatures, Isabella Lockhart Robertson and Miss Mary Duncan (both now in private hands) are particularly fine.

By 1850 James and Thomas had moved out of Circus Place and obtained a house together at 16 Comely Bank.

== Mezzotinter ==
Introduced to the mezzotint engraver, John Bonnar, James became interested in a more rapid process for preparing the plate for the engraver – possibly the engineering streak in him his father noticed. He also developed an intense interest in mezzotinting and soon began his career in that art and as an engraver in general. As a mezzotinter, for over fifty years, he was possibly only excelled in his day by Samuel Cousins (1801–1887). Several of Faed's mezzotints were commissioned by the Royal Association for the Promotion of Fine Arts in Scotland.

== Engraver ==
About 1871 James went to Australia in order to visit his brother William, who had emigrated, and stayed at Stony Park, Brunswick, the home of Theodotus John Sumner. When that house was later destroyed by fire, a record discovered mentioned that many engravings of cottage life, and proofs, by James Faed, were lost in the fire, but that some which survived were hung in the dining room of the rebuilt house.

His engravings of portraits became widely in demand and his first patron was John Watson Gordon who in 1850 became President of the Royal Scottish Academy and Her Majesty's Limner for Scotland. Faed engraved at least one hundred and thirty three plates, one of which was a Royal Commission for the painting of Queen Victoria and Prince Arthur, by Winterhalter, and his last commission was a portrait of the Countess of Seafield which was hung in the Royal Academy in 1877.

The last engraving James Faed undertook, at the age of eighty, was a portrait of the Earl of Home, father of the future Prime Minister, Sir Alec Douglas-Home. It was exhibited in the Royal Academy in 1899 and James received £159/10/- for the commission.

== Death ==
He died suddenly while eating his lunch at 7 Barnton Terrace, Edinburgh, in his ninety-first year. His wife Mary Cotton had died in 1887 at the age of sixty. They are buried with their sons, Dr Stewart Faed (1869-1898) and Francis Grant Faed (1867-1914) in Dean Cemetery. The grave lies under the trees at the west end of the north-west section.
