= Thomas Faed =

Scottish painter (1825–1900)

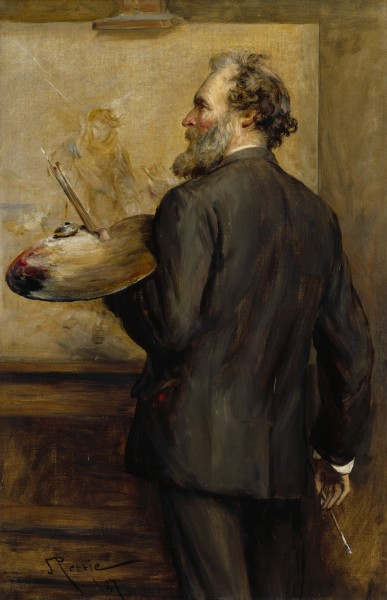
Thomas Faed (1887) by John Pettie

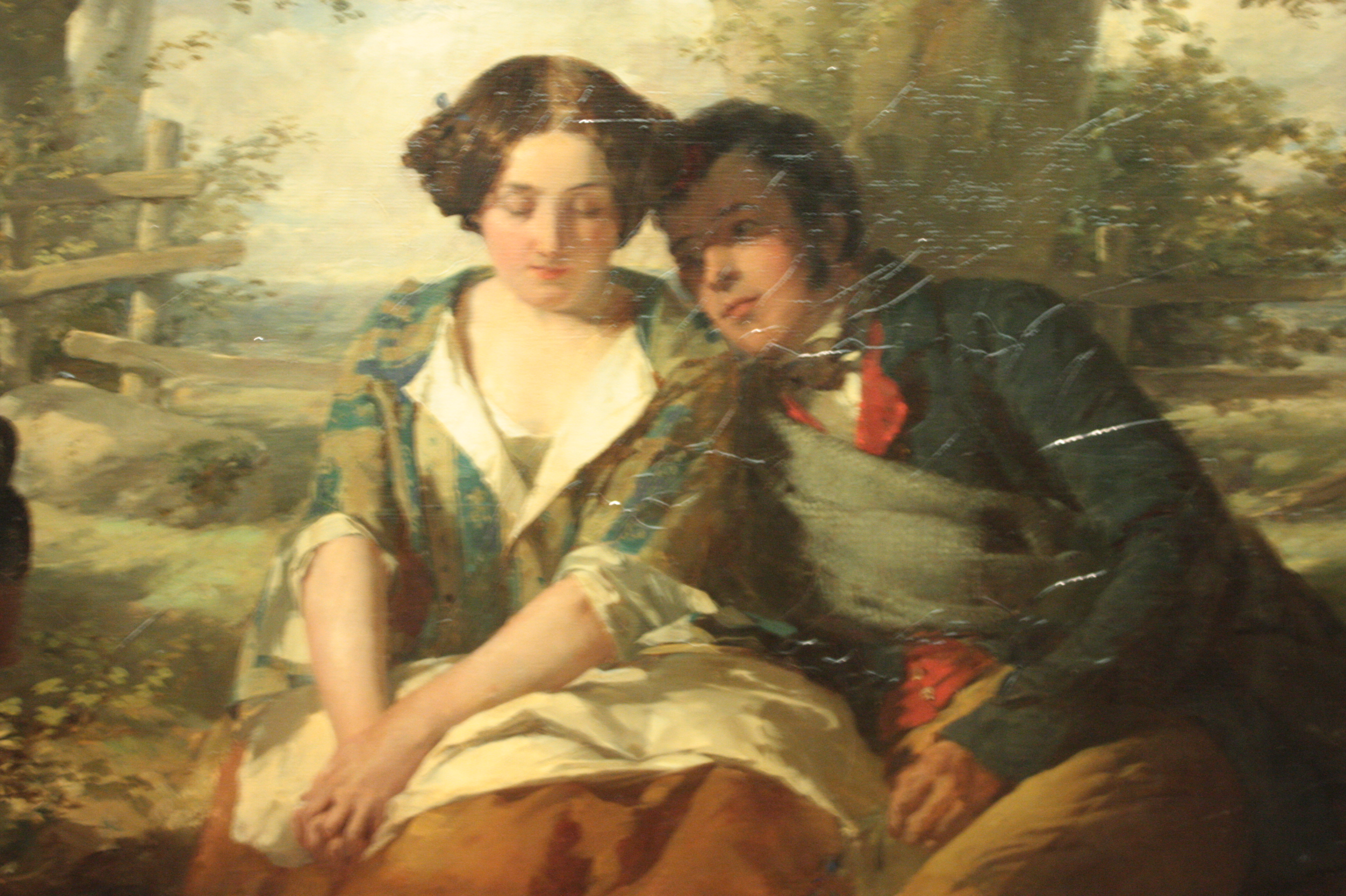
Burns and Highland Mary by Thomas Faed c. 1850

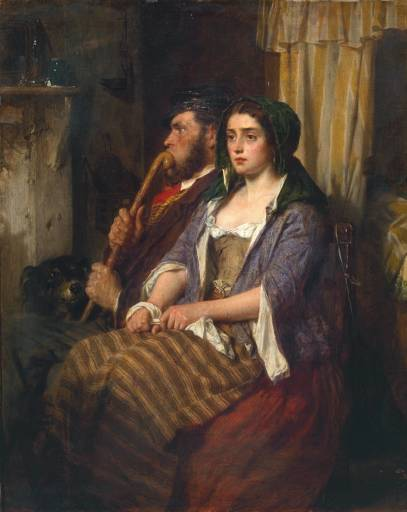
Faults on Both Sides (1861) Tate Gallery.

Thomas Faed RSA (1825–1900) was a Scottish painter who is said to have done for Scottish art what Robert Burns did for Scottish song.

== Life ==
Faed was born on 8 June 1825 at Barlay Mill in Gatehouse of Fleet, Kirkcudbrightshire, and was the brother of the artists James Faed, John Faed and Susan Faed.

He received his art education in the school of design, Edinburgh and was elected an associate of the Royal Scottish Academy in 1849. He went to London three years later, was elected an associate of the Royal Academy in 1861, and academician in 1864, and retired in 1893. He had much success as a painter of domestic genre, and had considerable executive capacity.

In 1850 he was living at 16 Comely Bank in north Edinburgh with his brother James Faed, an engraver. During his time in Edinburgh he was a member of the Edinburgh Smashers Club alongside William Fettes Douglas.

Three of his pictures, The Silken Gown, Faults on Both Sides, and The Highland Mother are in the Tate Gallery and a further two, Highland Mary and The Reaper hang in the Aberdeen Art Gallery. The Last of the Clan, completed in 1865 and arguably his best known work, is in the Kelvingrove Gallery in Glasgow. He produced several versions of this work, including a smaller version now in The Fleming Collection. Two other celebrated pictures are The Motherless Bairn and Scott and His Literary Friends at Abbotsford.

He died in London on 17 August 1900.
