= John Faed =

Scottish painter (1819–1902)

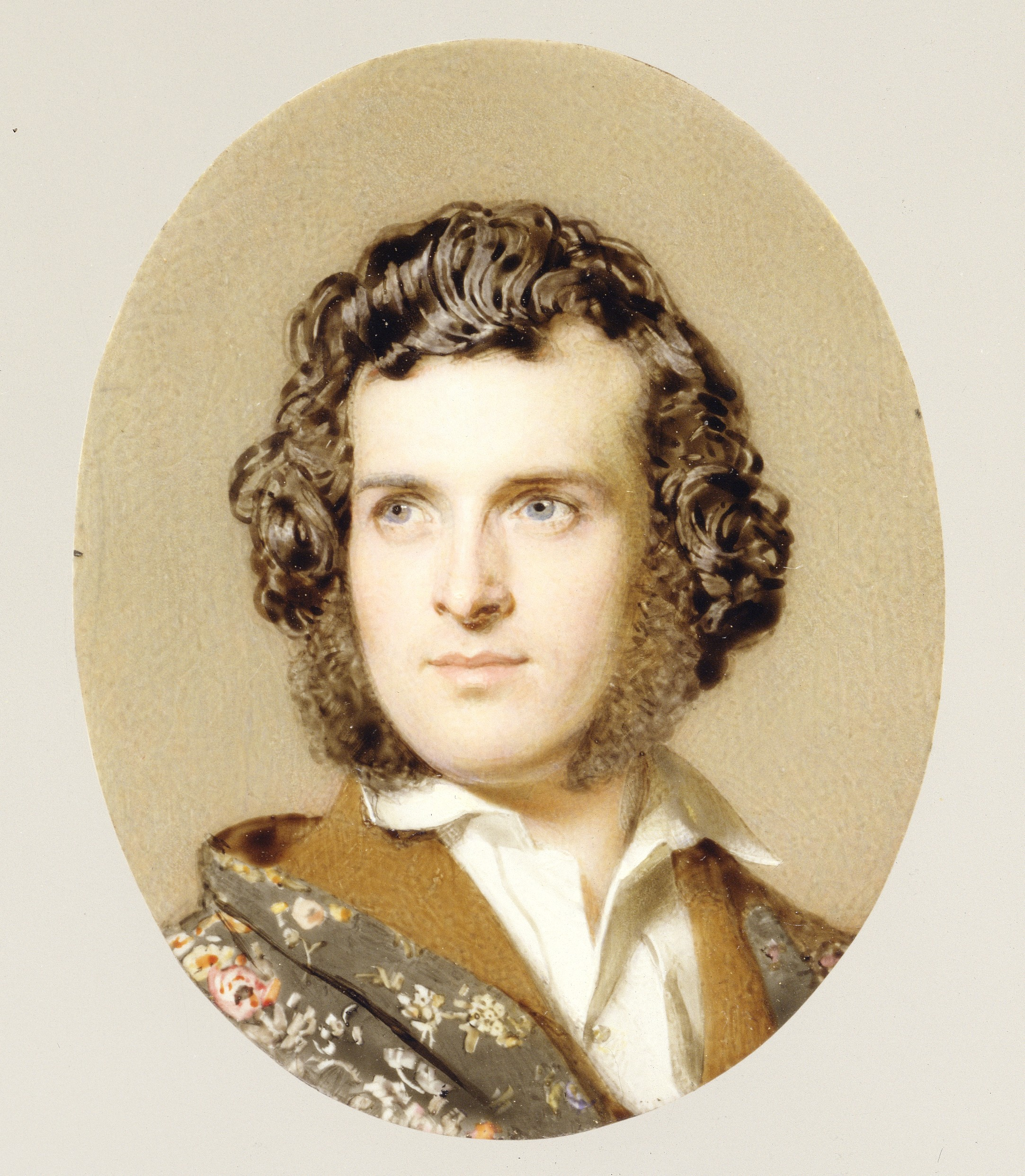
Self-portrait attributed to John Faed, circa 1850, Metropolitan Museum of Art

John Faed, R.S.A. (31 August 1819 – 22 October 1902) was a Scottish painter.

== Life ==
John was the eldest son of the six children of James Faed, tenant of Barlay Mill, near Gatehouse of Fleet, in the historic county of Kirkcudbrightshire, Galloway, and of Mary Faed, née McGeoch. Two other sons, Thomas, and James, also became artists, as did his sister Susan.

John began painting miniatures of local people when only nine years old.

Until the age of 11, John attended Girthon Parish School. The Castle Douglas Weekly Visitor for 19 August 1831 recorded that at the examination of Girthon school "the company present were shown a beautiful and correct book of maps, executed by John Faed, as a specimen of his many and varied drawings, which often ere now have elicited the admiration of all who have seen them".

He moved to Edinburgh in 1840 and in 1841 had his first exhibited work at the Royal Scottish Academy. In 1848 he is listed as a miniature painter living at 6 SW Circus Place in Stockbridge, Edinburgh.

Faed primarily painted religious, literary, and historical scenes. He exhibited at the Royal Scottish Academy and the Royal Academy almost continually. When he was President of the Kirkcudbrightshire Fine Art Association in 1899, his portrait of Sir Isaac Newton (painted when Faed was 36) was shown in the Dalbeattie Loan and Industrial Exhibition which took place in July and August that year. Faed also had a following in the United States. His Portrait of George Washington Taking the Salute at Trenton was the basis for a portrait bust engraving by William Holl the Younger used to illustrate an article on Washington in the Magazine of American History in 1880. His highly successful painting Shakespeare and his Friends at the Mermaid Tavern was sold to an American in 1851.

His paintings, popular in Victorian Britain, can today be found in private and public collections, including the National Gallery of Scotland.

In 1859 he helped Joseph Noel Paton raise the 1st Edinburgh (City) Artillery Volunteer Corps from among artists in the city and served as its lieutenant. He was an active member of the community where he finally made his home, Gatehouse of Fleet. He helped to conceive and develop a number of community projects such as the Gatehouse of Fleet Clock Tower and Gatehouse of Fleet Town Hall, which was opened in August 1885 by his brother Thomas Faed, by then a celebrated Academician.

He exhibited at the RSA until 1895.

Faed became seriously ill in the summer of 1902. He went to stay with his sister Susan Faed near Gatehouse of Fleet and died there on 22 October at the age of 83. He was buried beside his wife, Jane McDonald (d.1897), near Gatehouse in the Girthon parish churchyard. Susan was buried with him in 1909.

The known titles of his works amount to 278 items. Of these, 241 were hung in the Royal Scottish Academy, twenty of which were exhibited in the Royal Academy, and nineteen were exhibited in the Royal Academy only. The list is thought to be incomplete.

== Gallery ==
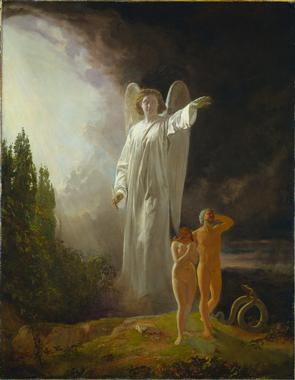
Expulsion of Adam and Eve, Cleveland Museum of Art (ca. 1880)

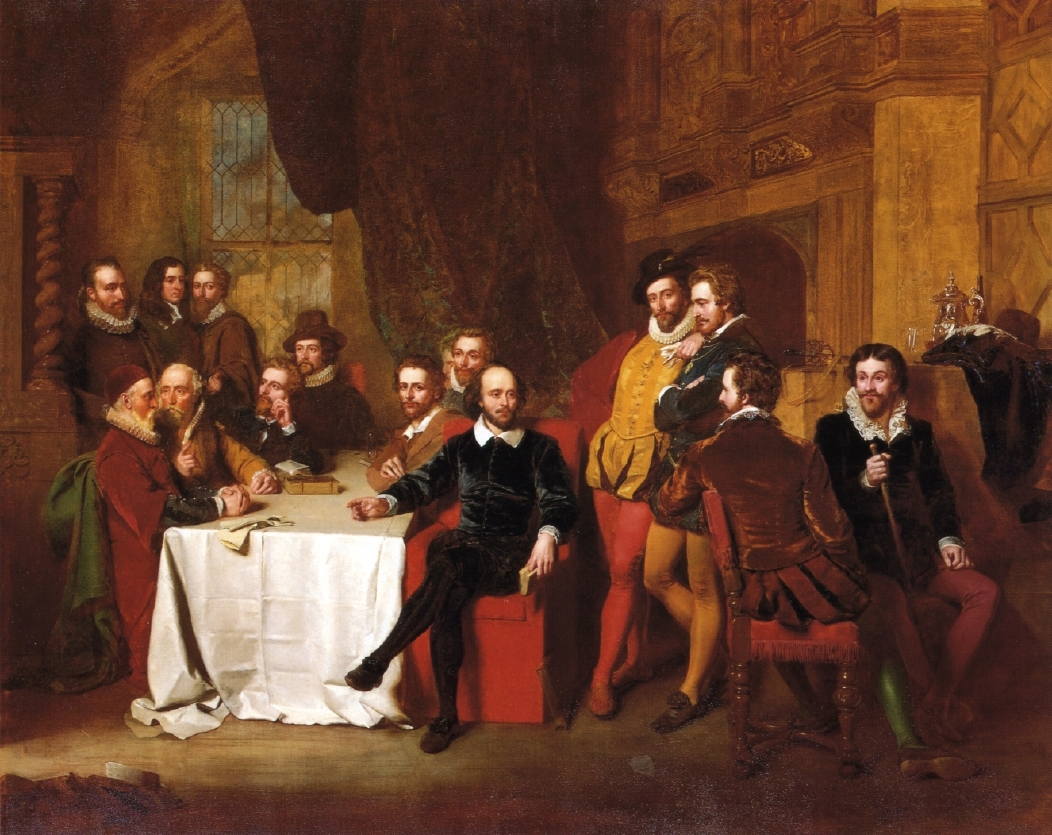
Shakespeare and his Friends at the Mermaid Tavern (1851)

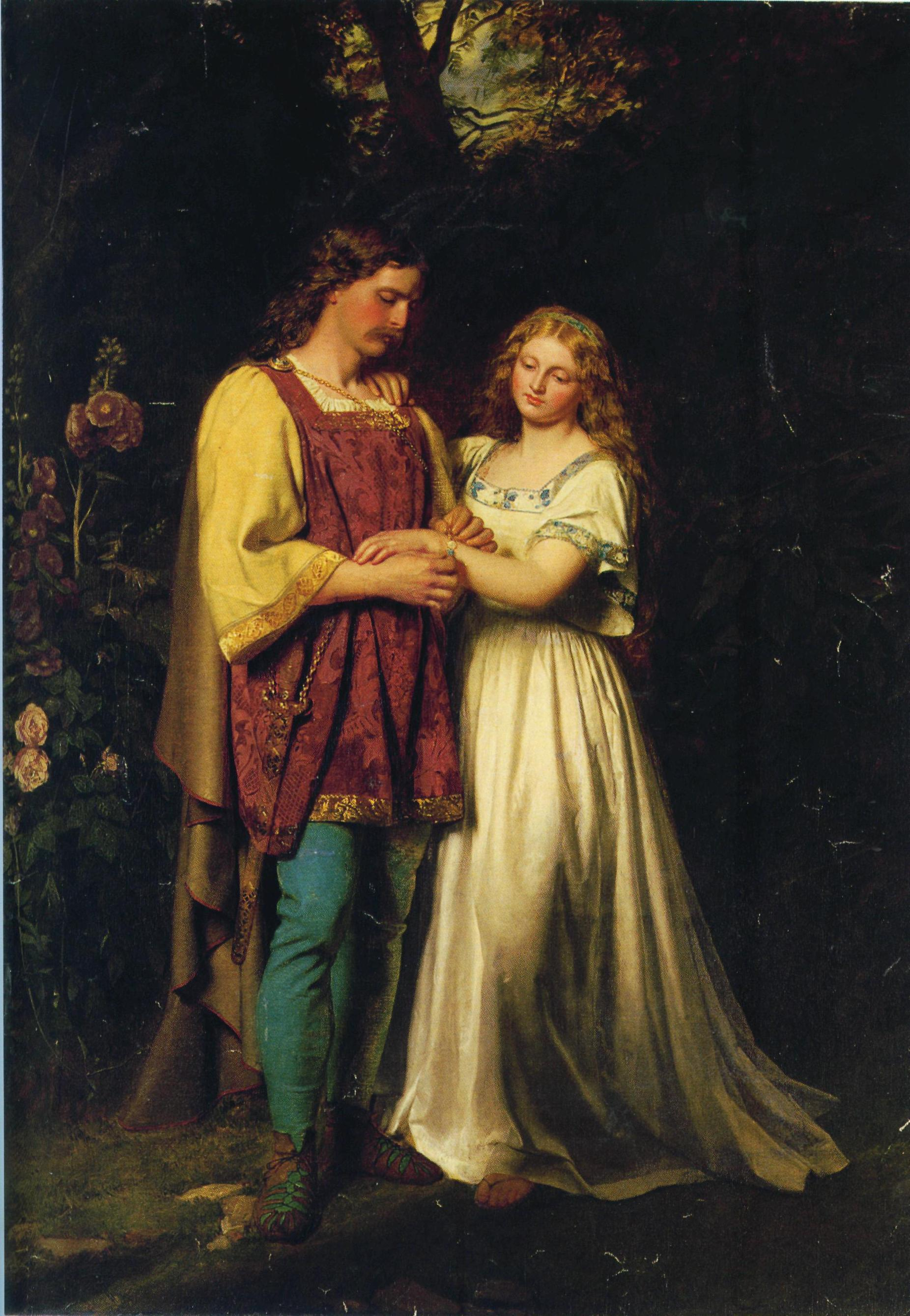
Postumus and Imogen, a scene from Shakespeare's Cymbeline

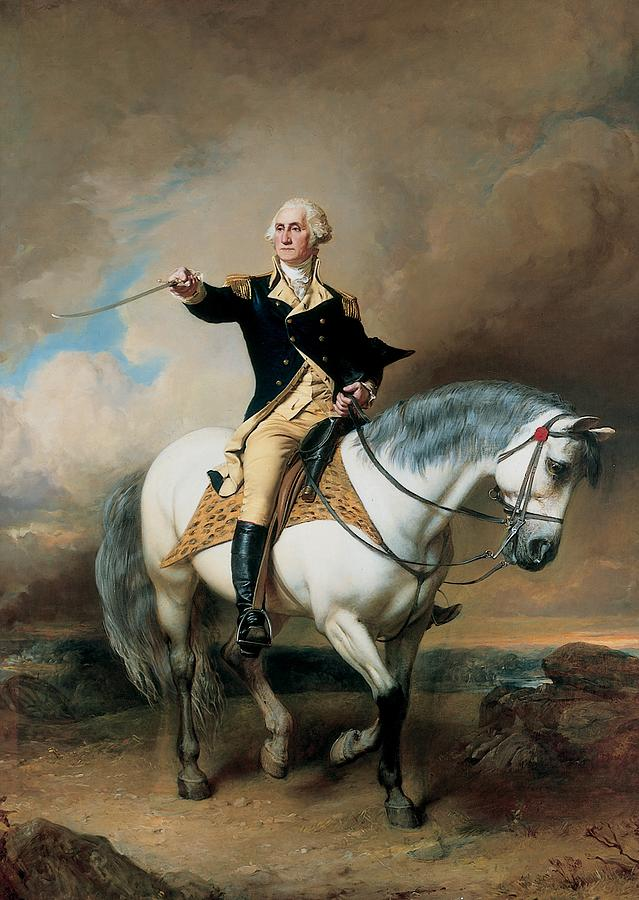
Portrait of George Washington Taking the Salute at Trenton (1856)

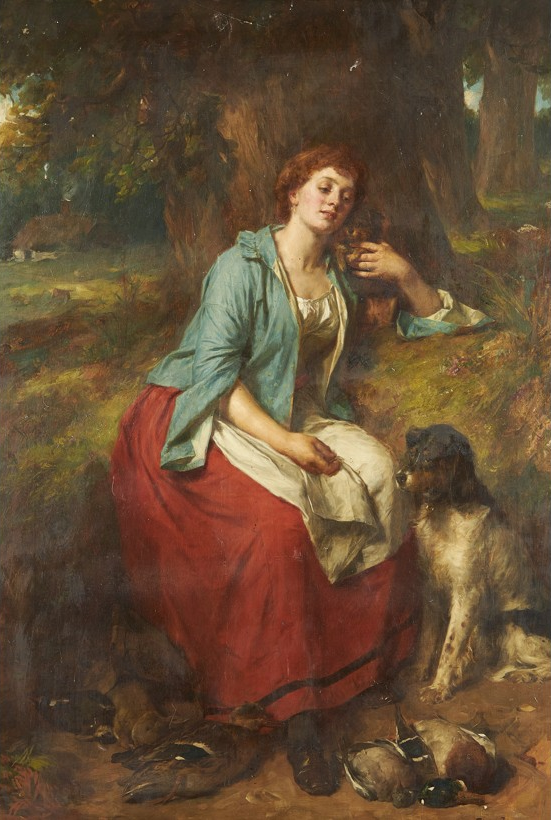
The Gamekeeper's Daughter (1870)

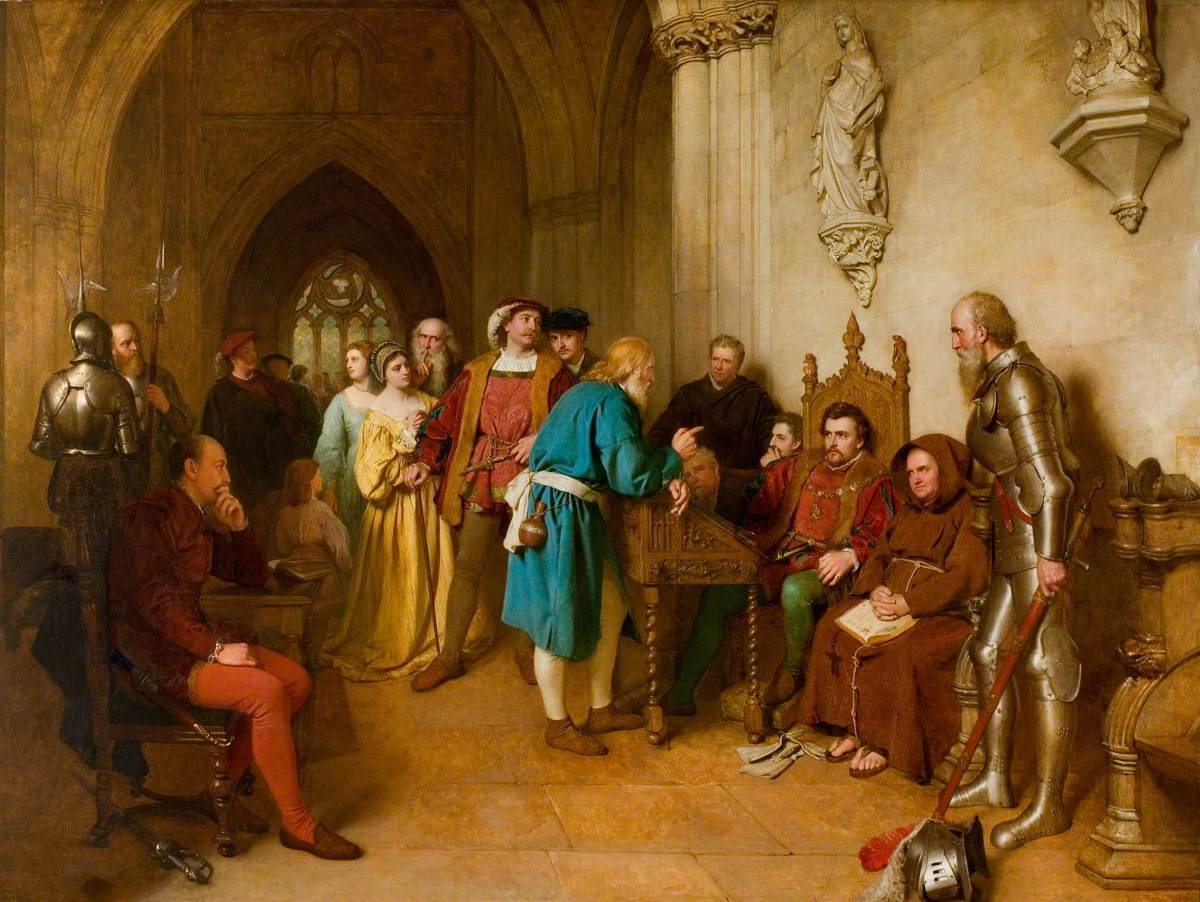
The Warning Before Flodden (1874)

Sir Joshua Reynolds Visiting Goldsmith in His Study (1877)
