= List of listed buildings in Parton, Dumfries and Galloway =

This is a list of listed buildings in the civil parish of Parton in Dumfries and Galloway, Scotland.

== List ==
Name	Location	Date Listed	Grid Ref. (Note: Sometimes known as OSGB36, the grid reference (where provided) is based on the British national grid reference system used by the Ordnance Survey. • "Guide to National Grid". Ordnance Survey. • "Get-a-map". Ordnance Survey.)	Geo-coordinates	Notes	LB Number (Note: Historic Environment Scotland assign a unique alphanumeric identifier to each designated site in Scotland, for listed buildings this always begins with "LB", for example "LB12345".)	Image
Old Temperance Inn				55°03′38″N 3°56′02″W	Category B	17099	Upload Photo
Parton Village Cottages; Nos 1-6 (Inclusive Nos), Post Office And Octagonal Lavatory Block To Rear Of Cottages				55°00′29″N 4°02′31″W	Category B	17068	Upload another image
Airds Of Parton, Lodge And Gates				55°00′44″N 4°03′36″W	Category B	17090	Upload Photo
Corsock Bridge				55°03′40″N 3°55′59″W	Category B	17092	Upload another image
Corsock House, Gates And Gatepiers				55°03′23″N 3°56′41″W	Category A	17094	Upload another image
Corsock House Stables				55°03′29″N 3°56′36″W	Category B	17095	Upload Photo
Knockvennie Bridge				55°01′10″N 3°56′26″W	Category B	17097	Upload another image
Parton Old Church				55°00′23″N 4°02′19″W	Category B	17101	Upload another image See more images
Corsock House				55°03′30″N 3°56′34″W	Category B	17080	Upload Photo
Airds Of Parton House, And Stables				55°00′54″N 4°03′30″W	Category B	17089	Upload Photo
Barwhillanty				55°00′48″N 3°59′58″W	Category B	17091	Upload Photo
Parton Parish Church (Church Of Scotland) And Churchyard				55°00′24″N 4°02′21″W	Category B	17100	Upload another image See more images
Parton Village, Parton Old Laundry				55°00′29″N 4°02′33″W	Category B	17069	Upload Photo
Corsock Chapel, Church Of Scotland				55°03′47″N 3°56′24″W	Category B	17093	Upload another image See more images
Glenlair House				55°01′43″N 3°56′36″W	Category B	17096	Upload another image
Loch Ken Viaduct				55°00′37″N 4°03′34″W	Category B	17098	Upload another image See more images

== Key ==
The scheme for classifying buildings in Scotland is:

- Category A: "buildings of national or international importance, either architectural or historic; or fine, little-altered examples of some particular period, style or building type."
- Category B: "buildings of regional or more than local importance; or major examples of some particular period, style or building type, which may have been altered."
- Category C: "buildings of local importance; lesser examples of any period, style, or building type, as originally constructed or moderately altered; and simple traditional buildings which group well with other listed buildings."

In March 2016 there were 47,288 listed buildings in Scotland. Of these, 8% were Category A, and 50% were Category B, with the remaining 42% being Category C.
