= Daniel Dewar =

Daniel Dewar MA
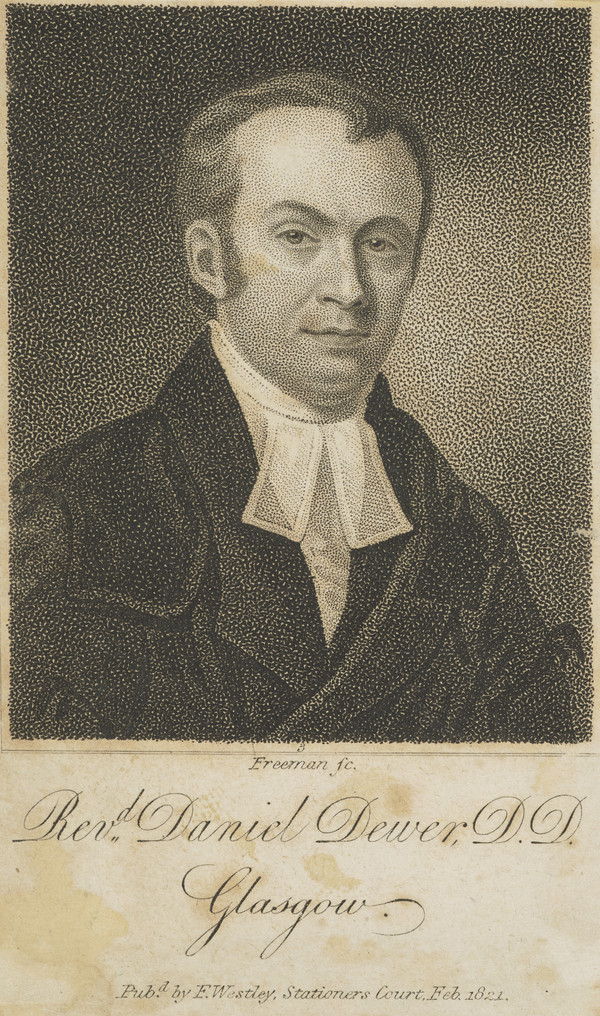
- Born: 1788; Glen Dochart, Perthshire, Scotland
- Died: 28 May 1867 (aged 78–79); Kilspindie, Perthshire, Scotland
- Occupation: Principal of Marischal College
- Spouse: Susan Place (m. 1821)
- Children: 7, including Katherine Clerk Maxwell

Academic background
- Education: University of Glasgow; University of Edinburgh

Daniel Dewar (1788–1867) was a Church of Scotland minister who served as the final principal of Marischal College in Aberdeen from 1832 to 1860. He was a major contributor to the first Gaelic dictionary. He was father-in-law to James Clerk Maxwell.

== Life ==
Dewar was born in Glen Dochart in 1788. He was educated at the University of Glasgow and Homerton Independent Academy in Hackney, London. He concluded his studies at the University of Edinburgh graduating with an MA in 1815.

In November 1812 he was licensed to preach as a Church of Scotland minister by the Presbytery of Mull. In September 1813 he was ordained as missionary to Strontian. In July 1814 he was given the post as minister of Greyfriars Church, Aberdeen. In May 1817 he began the additional role as Professor of Moral Philosophy at King's College, Aberdeen.

The University of Glasgow awarded him two honorary doctorates, and LLD in 1815 and DD in 1832.

In August 1819 he translated to Tron Kirk, Glasgow. He left in 1832 to take up the position of Principal of Marischal College in place of William Laurence Brown, jointly having the role as Professor of Church History.

Although being heavily involved in the lead up to the Disruption of 1843 he ultimately remained in the established church.

From 1855 to 1858 he corresponded with Sir Austen Layard.

He left his roles in 1860 when Marischal College merged with King's College, Aberdeen to create the University of Aberdeen. He purchased the estate of Over Durdie in Kilspindie and retired there, dying on 28 May 1867.

== Family ==
In September 1821 he married Susan Place (d.1876), daughter of Edward Place of Skelton Grange, Yorkshire. They had several children:

- Ann Gordon Dewar (b.1822) married John McCunn of Ardhallow in Dunoon
- Katherine Mary Dewar (1824-1886), married scientist James Clerk Maxwell
- Susan Place Dewar (b.1825)
- Edward Place Dewar (b.1827), minister of Auchtergaven
- William Gordon Dewar (b.1829)
- Donald Dewar (b.1831), minister of Ellon, Aberdeenshire
- John Dewar (b.1831) twin of above

== Artistic recognition ==
He was portrayed by engraver Samuel Freeman.

== Publications ==
- Observations on the Character, Customs and Superstitions of the Irish (1812)
- The Natural State of Man (1816)
- A Dictionary of the Gaelic Language (1831) with Rev Norman Macleod
