= Robert Barron (disambiguation) =

Robert Barron (born 1959) is the bishop of the Roman Catholic Diocese of Winona–Rochester.

Robert Barron may also refer to:

- Robert V. Barron (1932–2000), American actor and director
- Bob Barron (1928–1991), American NASCAR driver
- Robert Barron (locksmith), 18th-century English locksmith
- Robert Barron (minister) (1596–1639), Scottish academic, elected bishop of Orkney in the Church of Scotland

== See also ==
- Robert Baron (disambiguation)
