= Parton, Dumfries and Galloway =

Hamlet in Dumfries and Galloway, Scotland

Coordinates: 55.008°N 4.042°W

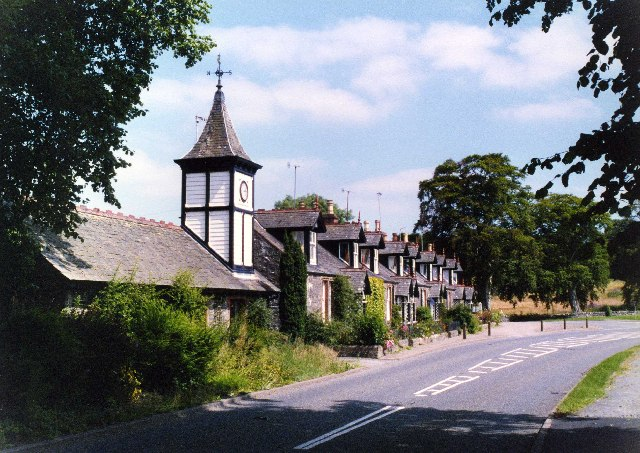
The village of Parton

Parton is a hamlet situated on the banks of the River Dee in the historical county of Kirkcudbrightshire, Dumfries and Galloway, Scotland.

== Notable buildings ==
Parton Row is the name of the cottages rebuilt in 1901 by the laird, Benjamin Rigby Murray, of Parton House. One was used as a library and reading room. The clock tower was added to an existing byre but later converted to a communal laundry. In later years the building nearest the hall was the village shop and post office and was the home of Sam Callander (1922 - 2012), who devoted much of his life to promoting the memory of the physicist James Clerk Maxwell.

Murray also built the village hall in 1908 with the motto over the entrance Floreat Partona ('let Parton flourish'). The motto alludes to the village song:

Sempiterne Splendeat Patriœ corona, Terra nobis augeat Segetes Pomona, Pax benigna protegat, Sit procul Bellona. Greges care veneant Cara sit annona, Gratos et sustineant Nos deorum dona. Partonenses floreant! Floreat Partona!	May the crown of the fatherland shine eternally, May Pomona increase, for us, the harvests from our land, May gentle Pax protect, may Bellona keep her distance. May the herds sell dear, may Annona be affectionate, and may the gifts of the gods sustain us, grateful. May Partonians flourish! May Parton flourish!

Parton railway station was part of the Portpatrick line, but closed in 1965. The station building was converted as a private house.

== Parton Kirk ==
Parton Kirk is by Walter Newall and was built in 1832–33. Of the old church of circa 1593 only the east gable wall survives and serves as part of the burial enclosure of James Clerk Maxwell and his wife Katherine Clerk Maxwell and the Rigby-Murrays of Parton. The oak pulpit from Old Parton Church dated to 1598 is now in the National Museum of Scotland in Edinburgh. It bears the initials 'I.G.', for John Glendonwyn of Parton, patron of the parish church whose arms are included in the carved decoration.

Prominent mathematical physicist James Clerk Maxwell lived at the nearby Glenlair House. He was famous for developing formulae governing electricity and magnetism as well as the Maxwell distribution in the kinetic theory of gases. He is commemorated by a monument beside the Parton war memorial in front of the church.

Also buried in the kirkyard is Maxwell's father John Clerk Maxwell of Middlebie and Elma Yerburgh (1864–1946) of the Thwaites Brewery family from Blackburn, who lived at nearby Barwhillanty. Here also is buried Dr David Summers (1947- 2009) Physicist and poet of Napier University, Edinburgh. Dr Summers lived in Parton Row.

== Estates ==
- Airds of Parton, by Peddie and Kinnear, architects, 1884, former home of Sir Arthur Henniker Hughan, MP for Galloway.
- Barwhillanty, by architect A Thompson 1887, home of the Yerburghs of the Daniel Thwaites brewing family.
- Glenlaggan, home of the Sanderson family, stood on an elevated spot overlooking Loch Ken, demolished 1950s.
- Glenlair, home of James Clerk Maxwell. House by Walter Newall 1830, for John Clerk Maxwell additions by Peddie and Kinnear,1884. Partially destroyed by fire 1929, ongoing restoration by the Glenlair Trust.
- Parton House, formerly the seat of the old Catholic Glendonwyn family and later the Rigby-Murrays. Visited by Robert Burns and his friend John Syme on their first Tour of Galloway on 27 July 1793. 18th century mansion replaced with Victorian mansion of 1884, demolished 1966, modern house on site. In the grounds are the remains of the Catholic domestic chapel and priest's house.

== James Clerk Maxwell ==
James Clerk Maxwell

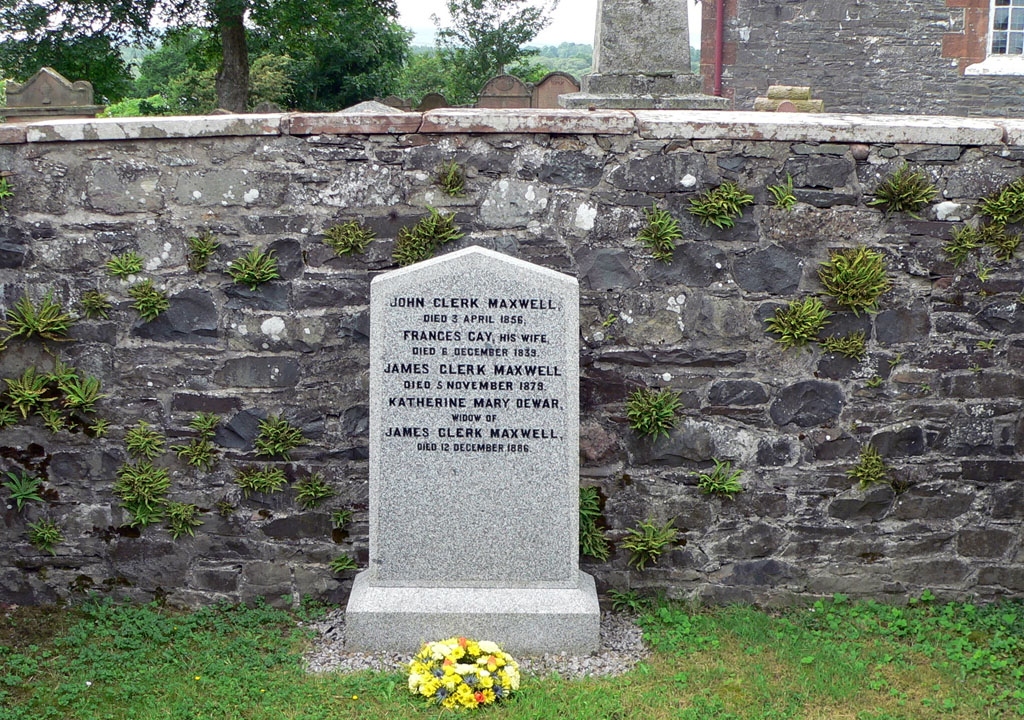
Gravestone of James Clerk Maxwell, his parents and his wife. It lies within the ruins of the Old Kirk in the burial ground of Parton Kirk.

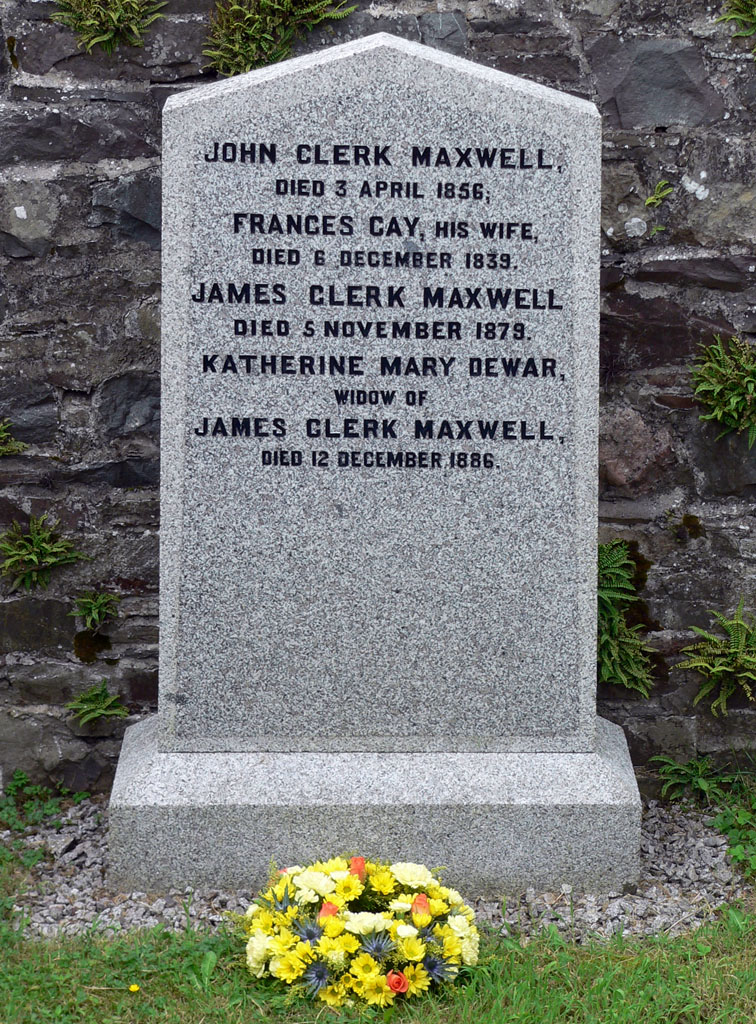
Clerk Maxwell family gravestone in detail.

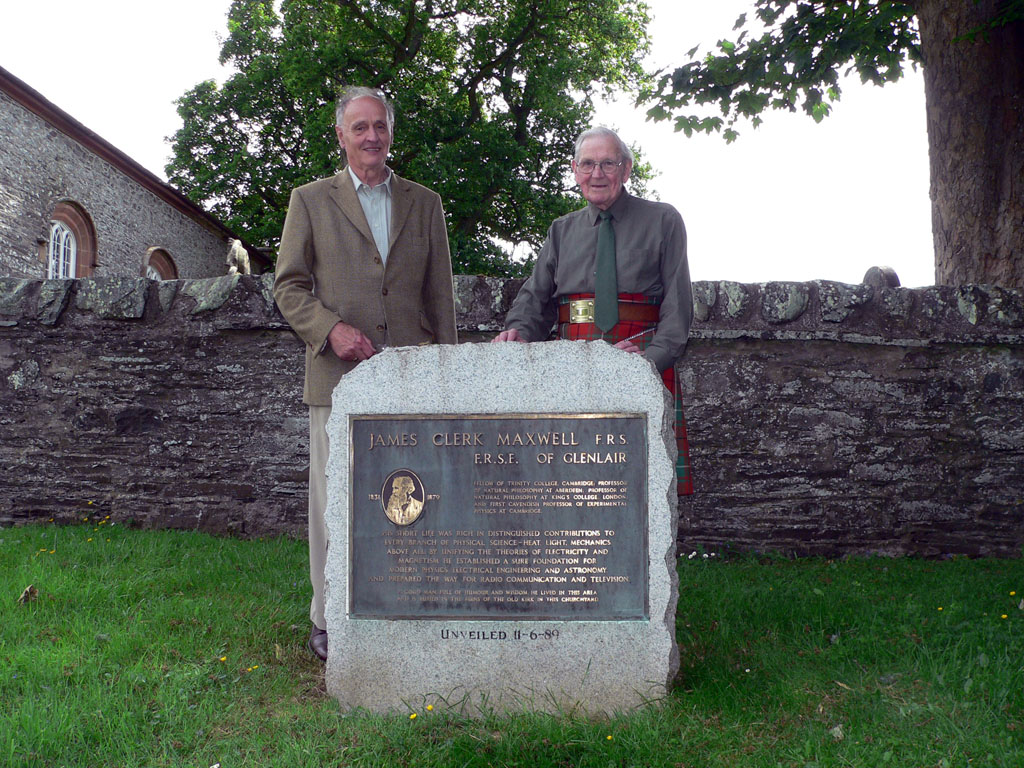
Memorial stone, on the right is Sam Callander (1922 - 2012) of Parton, who devoted much of his life to promoting the memory of Maxwell.

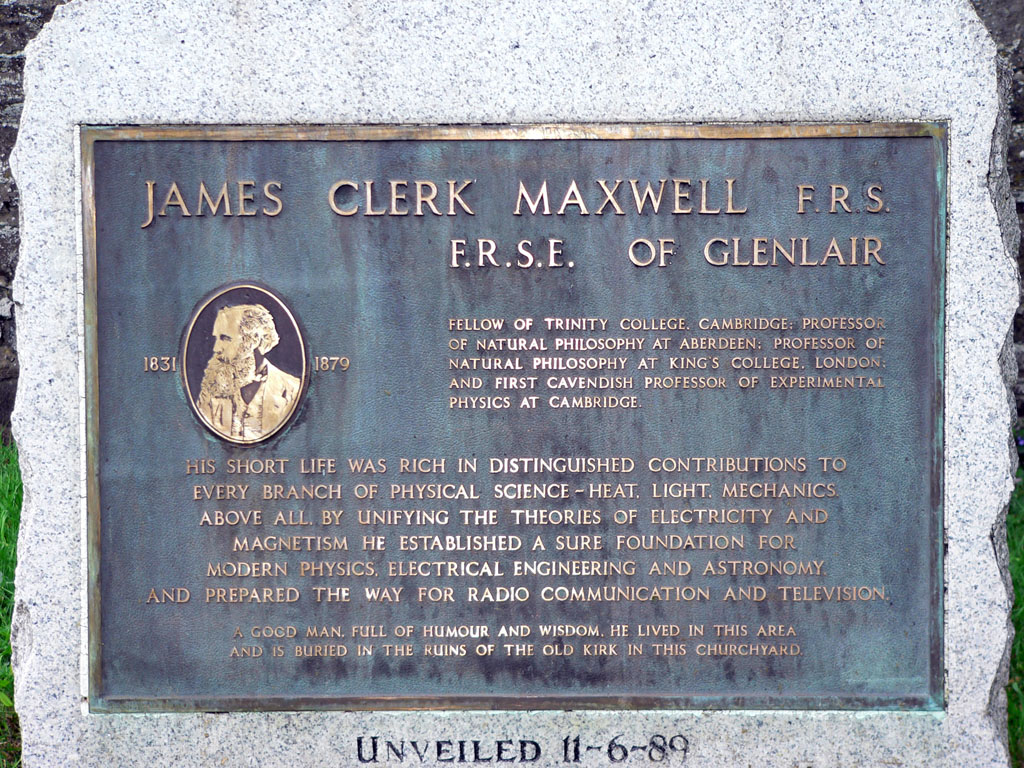
Detail of memorial stone to James Clerk Maxwell in front of Parton Church.

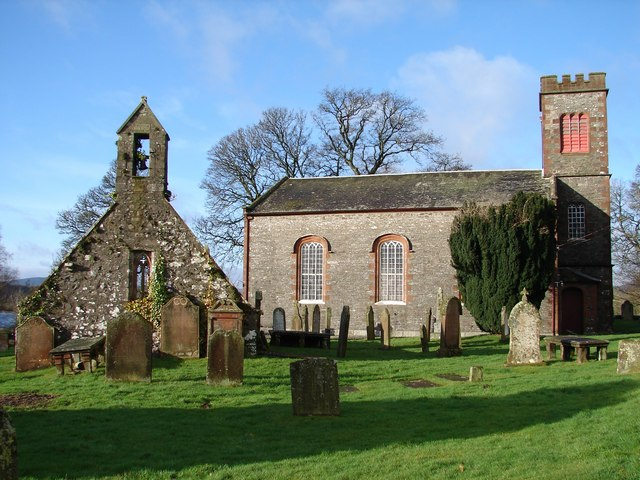
Parton Kirk and old church and church yard.

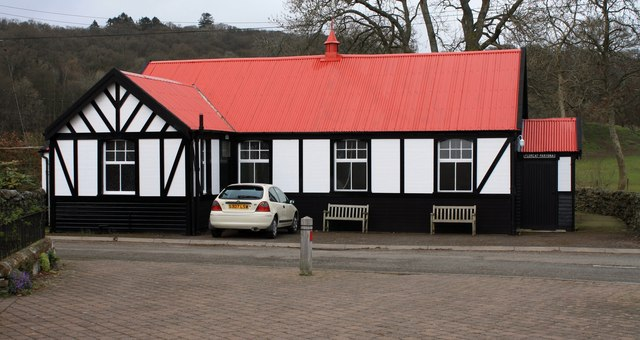
Parton Village Hall

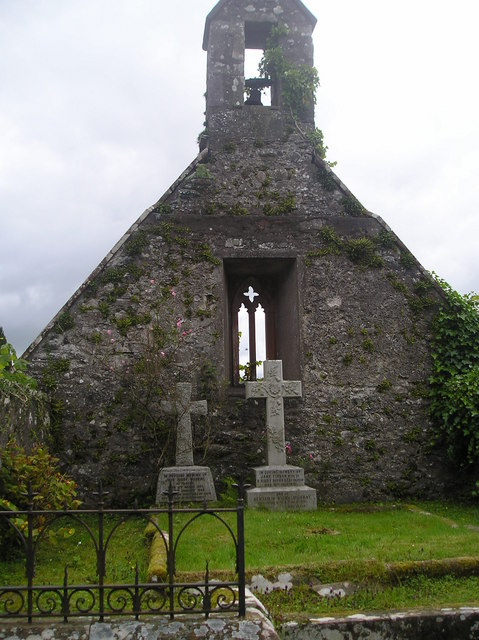
Headstones of the Rigby-Murrays in the burial enclosure at Parton Kirk.

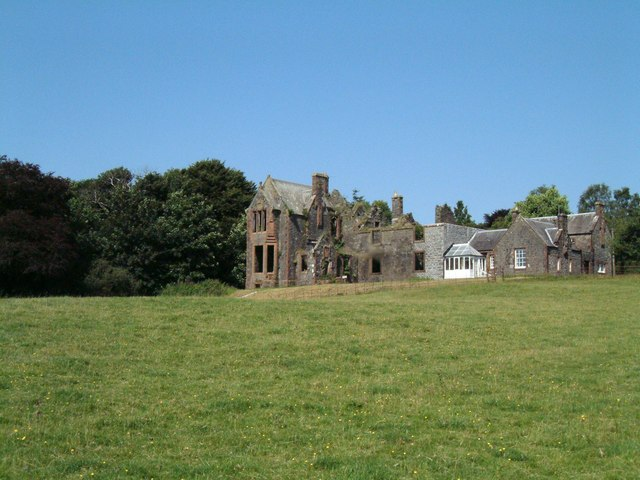
Glenlair

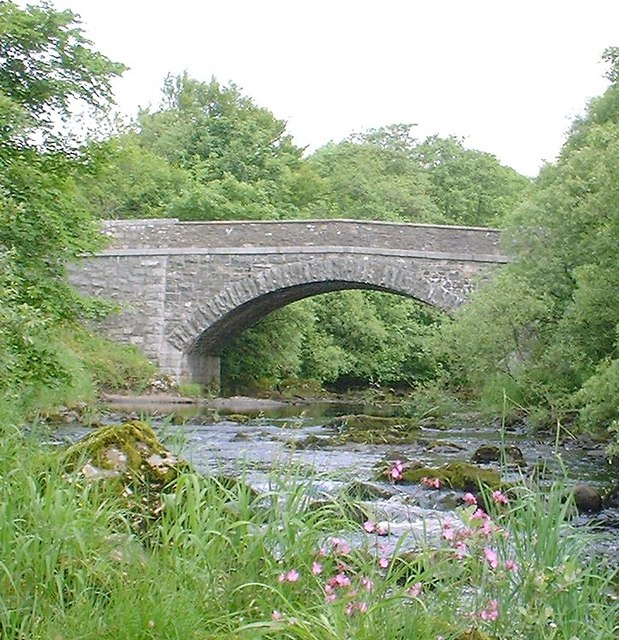
Glenlair Bridge
