= Alexander Gerard =

Scottish minister, academic and philosophical writer

Alexander Gerard FRSE
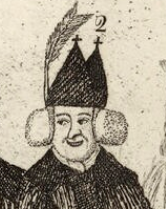
- Caricature from 'The Sapient Septemviri'
- Born: 22 February 1728
- Died: 22 January 1795 (aged 66)
- Spouse: Jane Wight (m. 1757)

Academic background
- Education: Aberdeen Grammar School
- Alma mater: University of Aberdeen; University of Edinburgh

Alexander Gerard FRSE (22 February 1728 – 22 February 1795) was a Scottish minister, academic and philosophical writer. In 1764 he was the Moderator of the General Assembly of the Church of Scotland.

== Biography ==
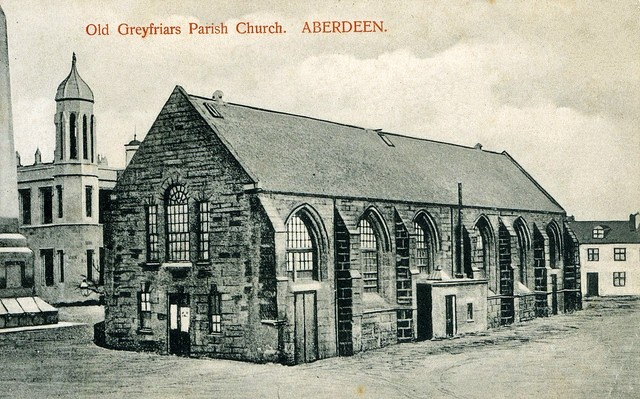
Greyfriars (John Knox) Kirk, original building, Broad Street, Aberdeen

He was born on 22 February 1728, the son of Gilbert Gerard (died 1738), at the manse in Garioch in Aberdeenshire. He attended Foveran Parish School then Aberdeen Grammar School.

He went to the University of Aberdeen, graduating with an MA in 1744. He then went to the University of Edinburgh to study divinity. He was licensed to preach in 1748.

In 1750 he returned to the University of Aberdeen to lecture in moral philosophy, becoming a professor in 1752, based at Marischal College.

From 1760 to 1769 he was minister of Greyfriars Church in Aberdeen and in 1769 was elected Professor of Divinity at Marischal College, moving in 1771 to King's College. As a professor he introduced various reforms. During this time he was also one of the ministers of the city, serving at Greyfriars Church. He was a member of the Aberdeen Philosophical Society, founded by John Gregory and including members such as Prof Thomas Gordon.

In 1783 he was a joint founder of the Royal Society of Edinburgh.

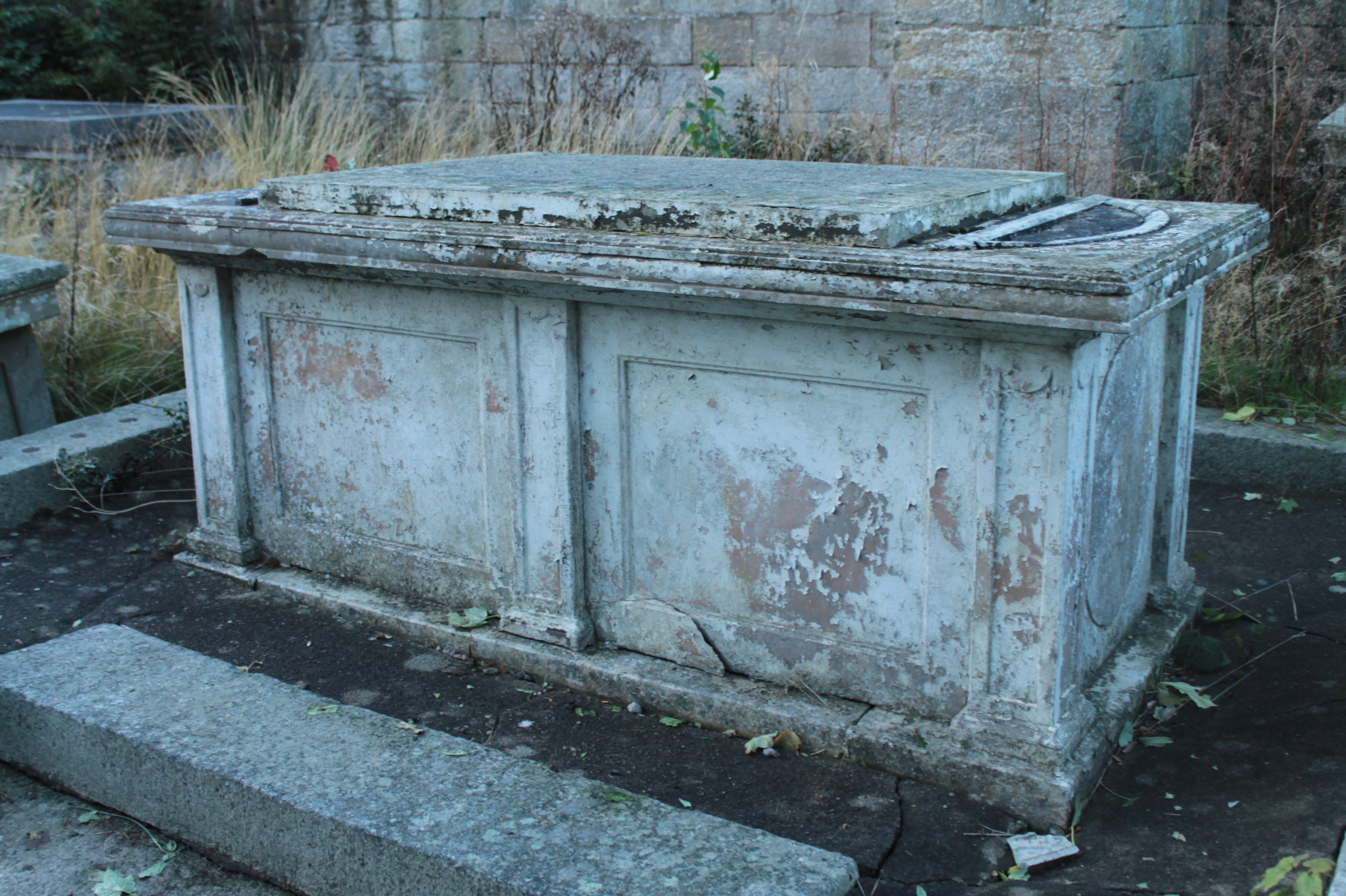
The grave of Rev Alexander Gerard, St Machar's Cathedral, Aberdeen

He died on 22 February 1795. He is buried in the churchyard of St Machar's Cathedral in Old Aberdeen. The grave lies near the south east corner of the eastern cathedral enclosure.

== Personal life ==
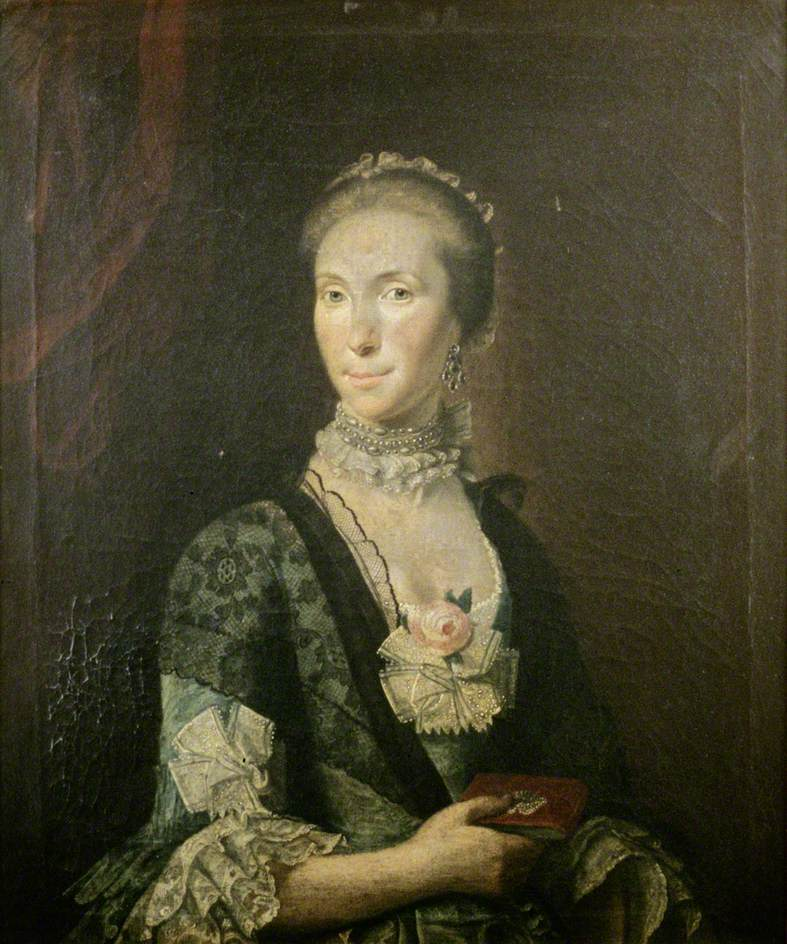
Portrait of Jane Gerard (née Wight), unknown artist

In June 1757 he married Jane Wight, daughter of Dr John Wight of Colnae. They had several children, including:

- Gilbert Gerard, born 1760.

== Publications ==
- In 1756 he gained the prize for an Essay on Taste which, together with an Essay on Genius, he subsequently published. These treatises, though now superseded, gained for him considerable reputation.
- Compendious View of the Evidences of Natural and Revealed Religion the joint work by Alexander Gerard and his son Gilbert Gerard, published 1828.
- A Plan of Education in Marischal College.
