= William Laurence Brown =

Scottish minister (1755–1830)

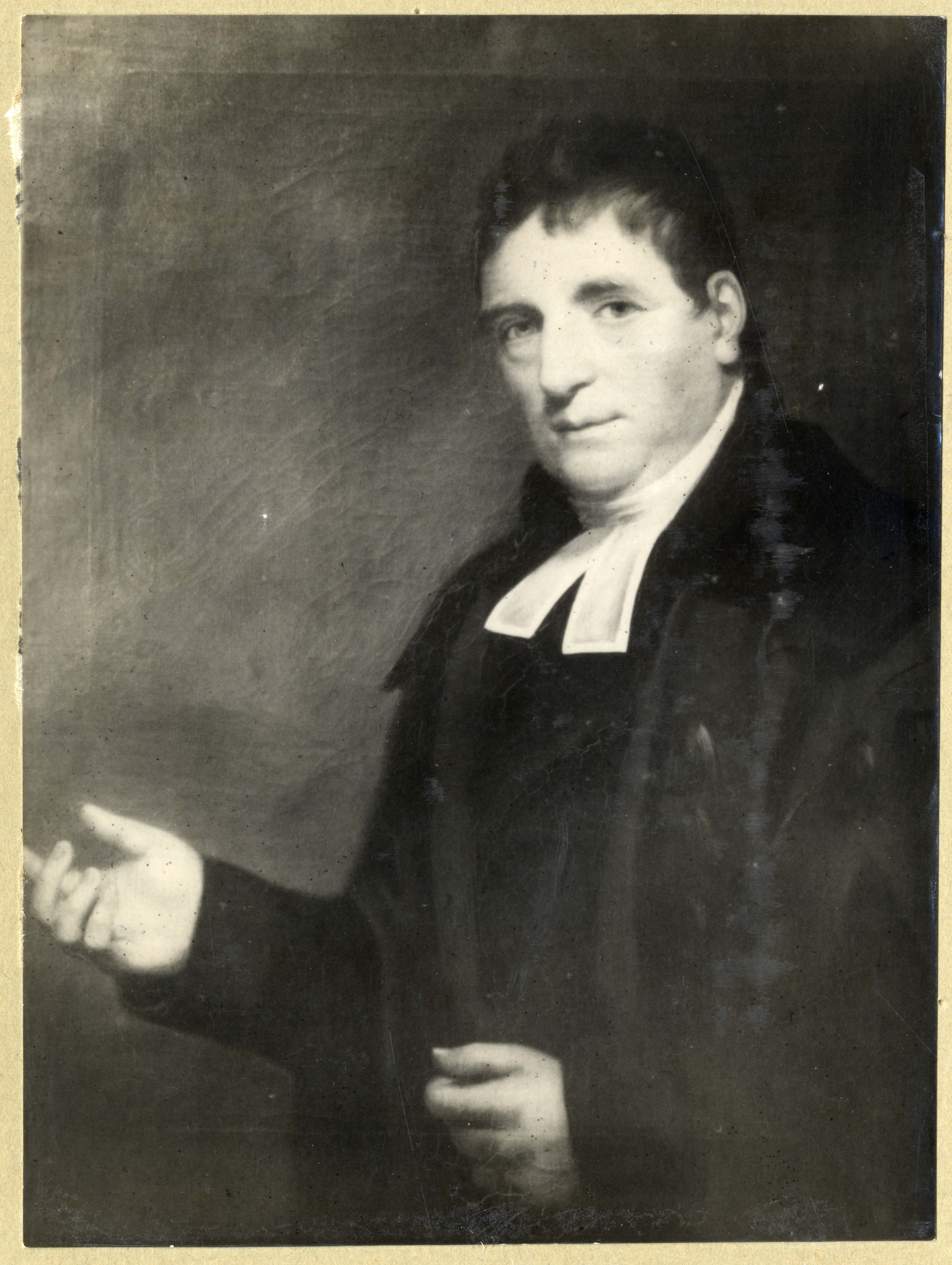
- Born: 7 January 1755; Utrecht, Netherlands
- Died: 11 May 1830 (aged 75)
- Occupation: Principal of Marischal College
- Spouse: Ann Elizabeth Brown
- Children: 9

Academic background
- Education: Utrecht University

William Laurence Brown (7 January 1755 – 11 May 1830) was a Scottish minister.

== Life ==
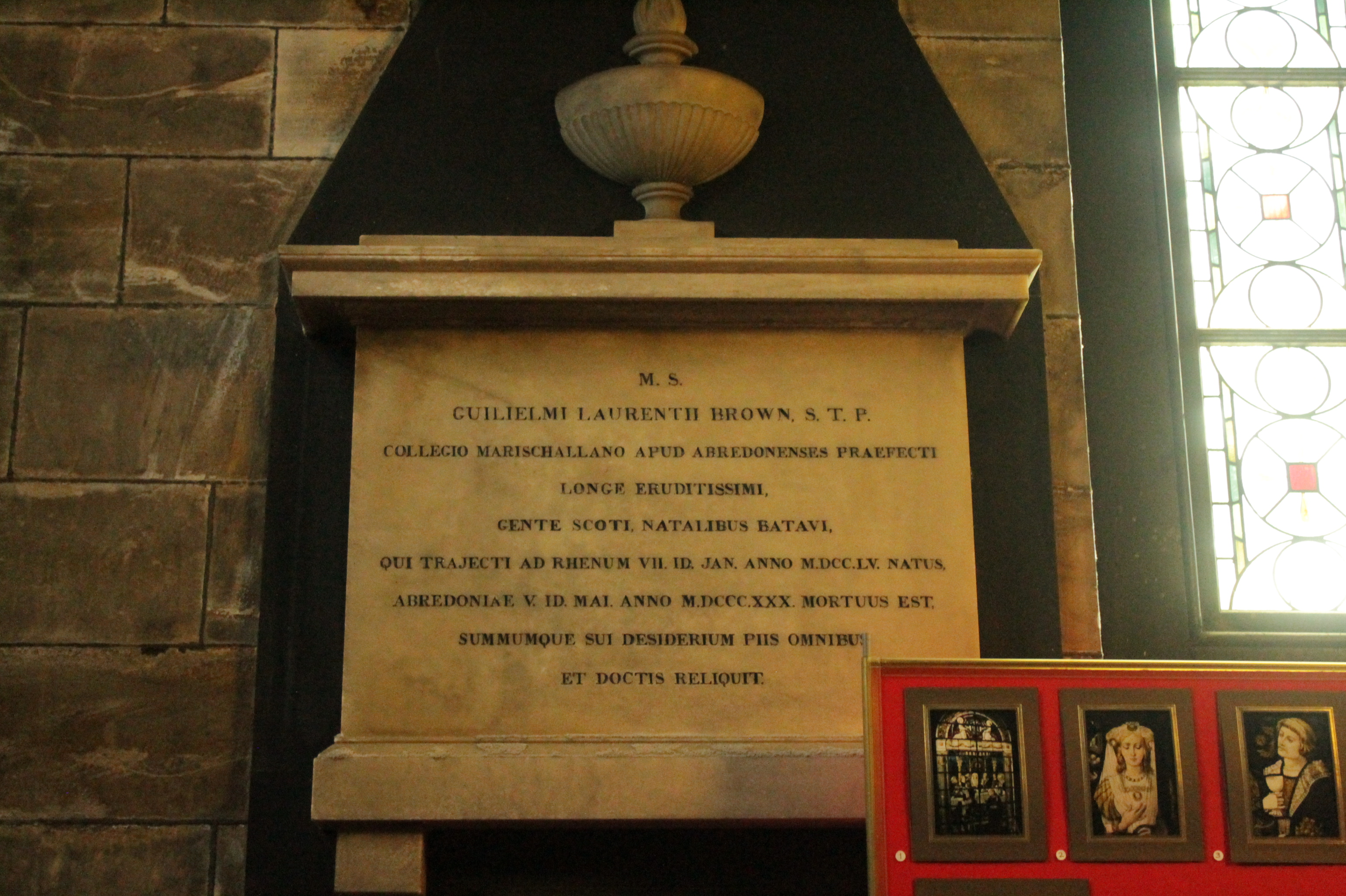
The grave of William Laurence Brown, Kirk of St Nicholas, Aberdeen

Brown was born in Utrecht in the Netherlands. His father, William Brown, was minister of the English church there, but was then appointed professor of ecclesiastical history at St Andrews, and therefore returned to Scotland in 1757. Brown went to the grammar school there, and then to the university, graduating MA in 1772. After passing through the divinity classes, in 1774 he went to the University of Utrecht, where he studied theology and civil law.

He was licensed to preach by the Presbytery of St Andrews in October 1777 and he was appointed minister the Scots Church in Utrecht in place of his uncle Robert Brown in January 1778. The University awarded him a Doctor of Divinity in 1784. In 1788 he was appointed Professor of Moral Philosophy and Law of Nations (International Law) at the University of Utrecht. To this was added the professorship of the law of nature. He was made Rector of the University of Utrecht in 1790. At the threat of French invasion of the Netherlands following the French Revolution Brown and his young family sailed back to Aberdeen in January 1795.

In June 1795 the magistrates of Aberdeen elected him to the post of minister of Greyfriars Church and he was ordained into that post in August 1795 at the same time being given the post of Professor of Divinity at Marischal College, which physically adjoins the church. In January 1796 he was made Principal of Marischal College in place of George Campbell. In March 1800 he was appointed Chaplain in Ordinary to the King, and in October 1803 was made Dean of the Chapel Royal, and Dean of the Order of the Thistle.

From 1824 to 1828 he was Patron of the Seven Incorporated Trades of Aberdeen.

He is buried in the Kirk of St Nicholas on Union Street in Aberdeen.

== Family ==
In May 1786 in Utrecht he married his first cousin, Ann Elizabeth Brown (1764–1844), daughter of Rev Robert Brown of the Scots Church in Utrecht (1728–1777).

Their nine children were:

- Rev William Robert Brown (1787-1856), minister of Little Clacton, Essex, died at Portsea.
- Laurence George Brown MA (b.1788, Utrecht), died in Quebec, Canada, 13 January 1852.
- Catherine Mary Ann (b.1790)
- Joanna (Janet) Elizabeth (b.1791)
- Robert James Brown (b.1792), Moderator of the General Assembly of the Free Church of Scotland in 1846/47.
- Ann (Nancy) Elizabeth (1795-1847) married James Conacher lawyer in Dunkeld
- Dr John Moore Brown (b.1797) physician in Aberdeen, died in 1849, Ontario, Canada
- Helen Jane Brown (b.1797-1848) twin of John
- Dr George Gilbert Brown (1800-1873) Inspector General of Hospitals

== Selected works ==
- The History of St Rule's Chapel (1780)
- An essay on the Folly of Scepticism (1788)
- An essay on Sensibility (1791)
- An Essay on the Natural Equality of Men (1793), which gained the Teylers Eerste Genootschap's prize;
- On the Existence of the Supreme Creator (1826), to which was awarded the first Burnet prize of £1250; and
- A Comparative View of Christianity, and of the other Forms of Religion with regard to their Moral Tendency (2 vols, 1826).
