= James Sievewright =

Scottish minister (1783–1852)

James Sievewright (1783–1852) was a Scottish minister of the Free Church of Scotland and who served as Moderator of the General Assembly 1847/48.

== Life ==
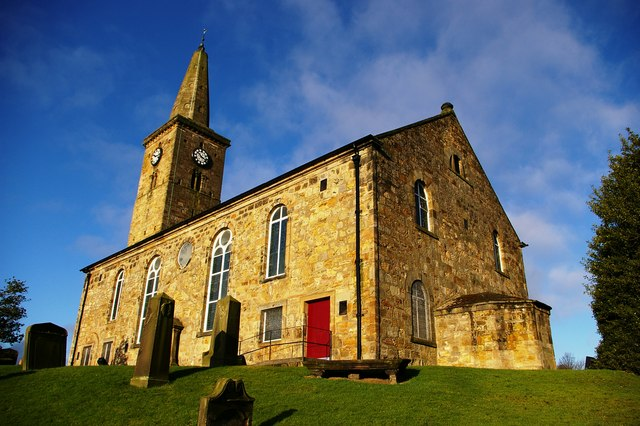
Markinch Parish Church and churchyard

He was born the third son of James Sievewright at Drumdelgie in the parish of Cairnie in Aberdeenshire and was baptised on 19 March 1783. He graduated MA from Marischal College, Aberdeen in April 1807 and became tutor to the children of Rev Dr Alexander Stewart of Dingwall. He was licensed to preach by the Church of Scotland's Presbytery in Perth in 1812.

In 1815 he was ordained by the Church of Scotland at Gateshead in the north of England. He must have been well-connected as he was presented to the church by his patron, George the Prince Regent (later known as King George IV).

In 1818 he translated to St Drostan's in Markinch in Fife and remained there for the rest of his life. He added a clock to the spire in 1839.

In the Disruption of 1843 he (and a large part of his congregation) left the established church and joined the Free Church of Scotland. The new church, designed by Robert Hutchison who specialised in churches and schools, was built in 1844 and was known as the Brunton Church. It was paid for by Mrs Paxton and Miss Arthur, both of Markinch. A new manse was also built.

In 1847 he succeeded Rev Robert James Brown as Moderator of the General Assembly, the highest position within the Free Church. He was succeeded in turn in 1848 by Rev Patrick Clason.

He died in Markinch on 29 November 1852 and was buried in Markinch parish churchyard (his original church).

His position was filled there by Rev Ninian Jamieson.

The Brunton Church transferred to the United Free Church of Scotland in the Union of 1900. It was renamed St Marks in 1929 and converted to flats in 1994.

== Family ==
In June 1815 he married Jessie Mellis (1795-1864). She died at 4 Findhorn Place in Edinburgh.

Her brother David Barclay Mellis (1800-1861) was also a Free Church minister.

== Publications ==
- Five Occasional Sermons (1816)
- Memoirs of Rev Alexander Stewart DD (1822)
- Thoughts on Sanctification (1825)
- Sermons (1826)
- A Protestor's Apology for Quitting the Established Church (1843)
- Memorials of a Ministry (1856 - posthumous)

== See also ==
- Works by or about James Sievewright at the Internet Archive
