= Walter Newall =

Scottish architect and civil engineer

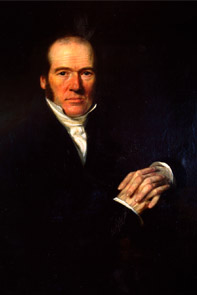
- Portrait of Walter Newall
- Born: 3 April 1780; Doubledyke, New Abbey, Kirkcudbrightshire
- Died: 25 December 1863 (aged 83); Craigend, New Abbey, Kirkcudbrightshire
- Occupation: Architect
- Buildings: Moat Brae, Dumfries Hannayfield, Dumfries; Glenlair, Kirkcudbrightshire; The Observatory, Dumfries; Assembly Rooms, Dumfries; Moffat Town Hall (originally the Pump House & Baths) Cardoness, Kirkcudbrightshire

Walter Newall (3 April 1780 – 25 December 1863) was a Scottish architect and civil engineer, born at Doubledyke in the parish of New Abbey in the historic county of Kirkcudbrightshire, Scotland. He was the leading architect in the Dumfries area, from the 1820s until his retirement. He trained James Barbour who succeeded him as principal architect in the region.

== Career ==
Newall began his design career in partnership with an upholsterer and a cabinet maker in the Dumfries firm of Newall, Hannah and Reid. Nothing is known of any architectural training, although Howard Colvin suggests that his knowledge of up-to-date styles points to time spent with an architect of standing.

Throughout his working life he lived mainly in Dumfries, travelling around Dumfriesshire, Kirkcudbrightshire and Wigtownshire in the course of his work. His papers show him to have made tours of Germany and Italy, as well as parts of England, notably Oxford, Cambridge and Fonthill. The architects John Edgar Gregan (1813–55), William Reid Corson (1821–86), his brother George Corson (1829–1910) and James Barbour (1834–1912) all served as apprentices under Newall.

Newall died at Craigend, New Abbey, on Christmas Day, 1863. An extensive archive of Newall's sketchbooks, drawings and plans have survived and were purchased by Dumfries Museum in the spring of 1991. Newall is buried in St. Michael's Churchyard, Dumfries.

== Works ==
His built works included villas at Cardoness (1828), for Sir David Maxwell, Baronet, and Glenlair, Corsock (1830), home of mathematician and theoretical physicist James Clerk Maxwell. In Dumfries, Newall built the Assembly Rooms (1825), several commercial buildings including offices for his own use on the High Street, and several private houses including Moat Brae (1823), whose gardens, a childhood haunt of author J. M. Barrie, were the inspiration for Peter Pan. Newall remodelled a windmill in neoclassical style to serve as the town observatory, which later became Dumfries Museum. He designed St Mary's Church and clergy house at New Abbey built in 1824. He also designed several Gothic churches, including those at Buittle (1818–19), Anwoth (1826–27), and Kirkpatrick Durham (1849–50). His Greek Revival-style villas were admired by J. C. Loudon, and Hannahfield (later called Ladyfield West), on the Nith south of Dumfries (the only Category A-listed building by Newall, but which has sadly not 'enjoyed' statutory protection) featured in his Encyclopaedia of Cottage, Farm, Villa Architecture (1834).

== Gallery ==
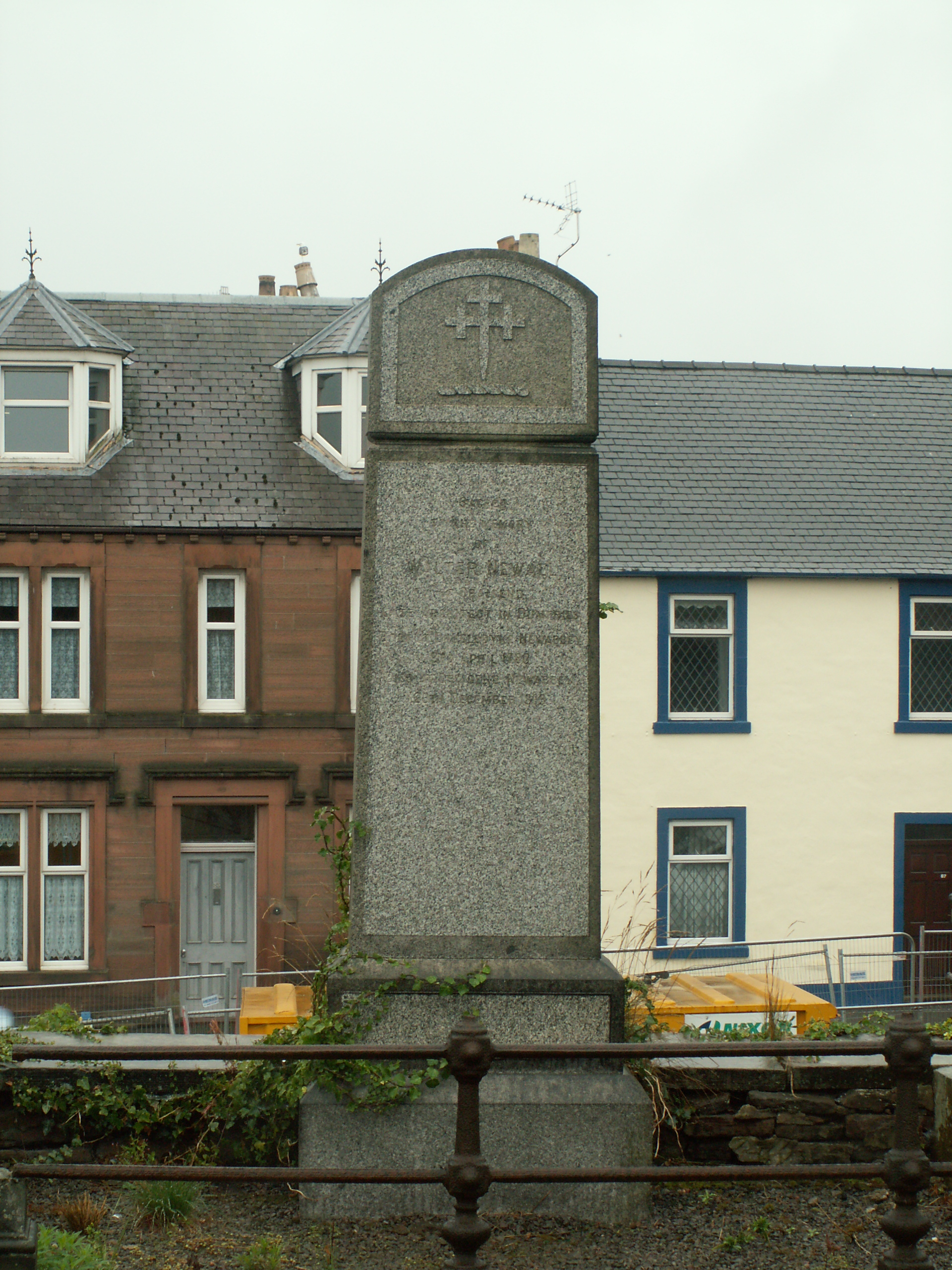
Gravestone of Walter Newall, St. Michael's Churchyard, Dumfries

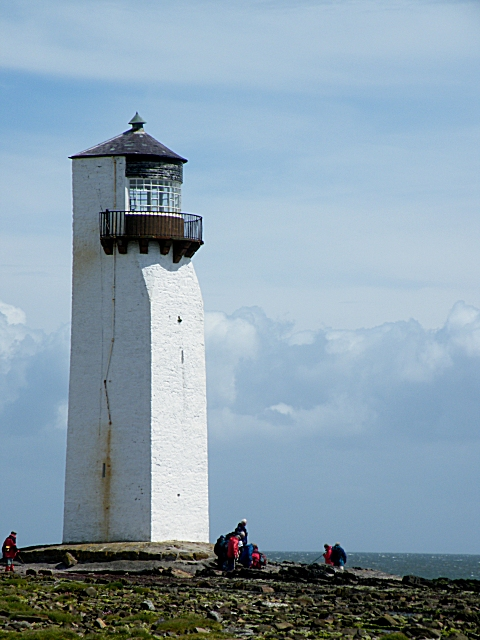
Southerness Lighthouse (1842-3), Solway Firth

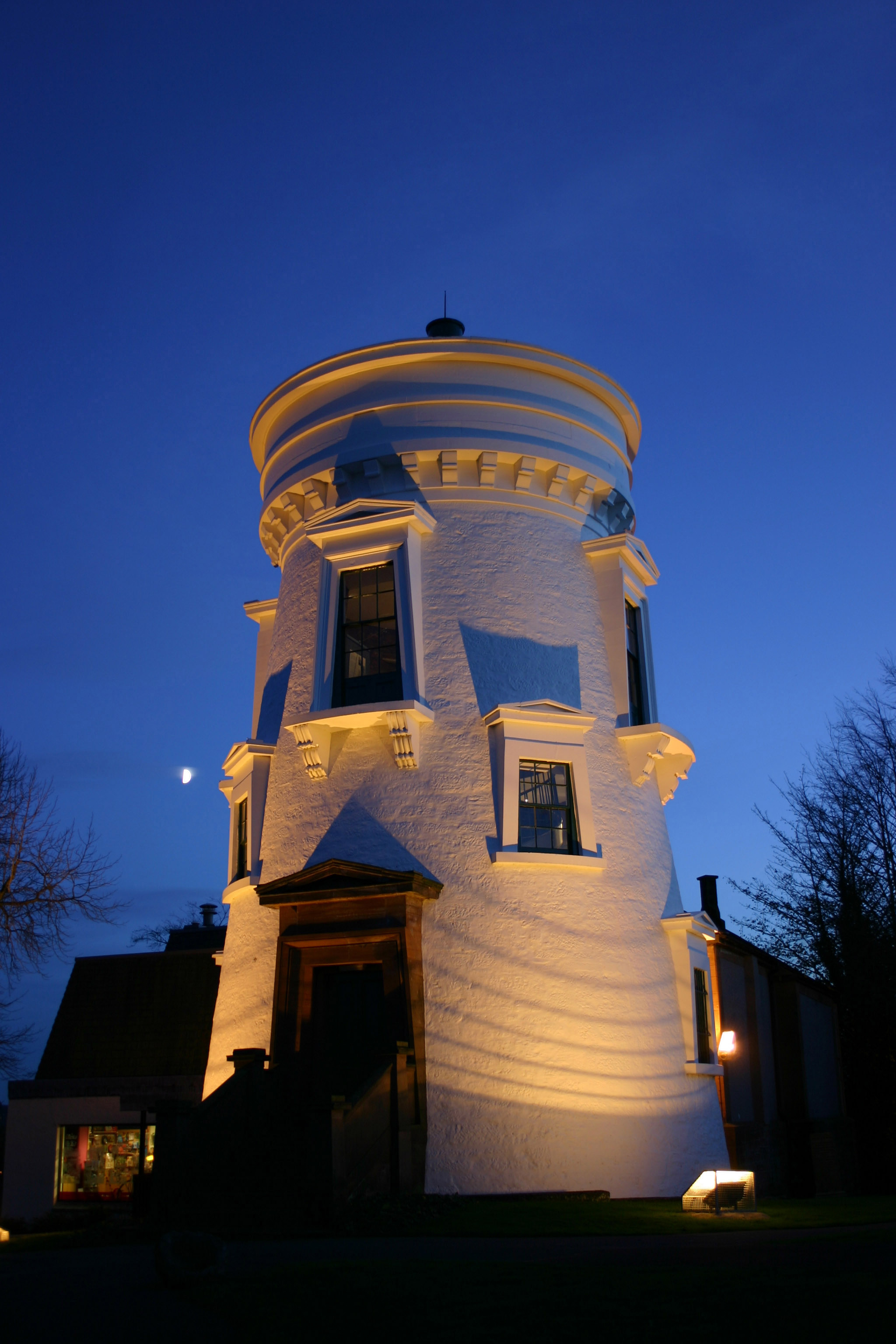
The Observatory (1836), Dumfries

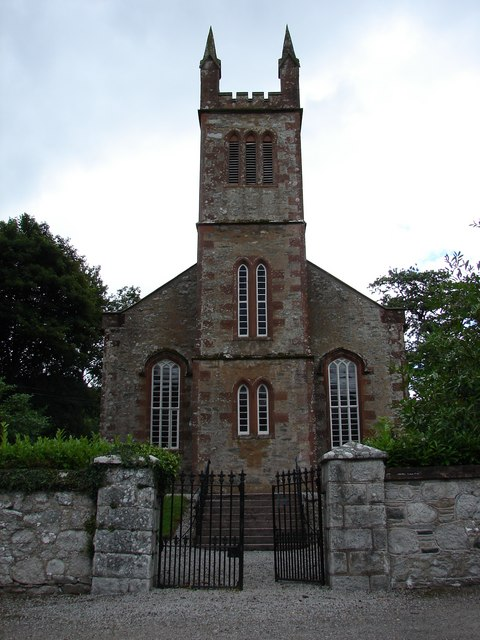
Anwoth Church (1826), Kirkcudbrightshire

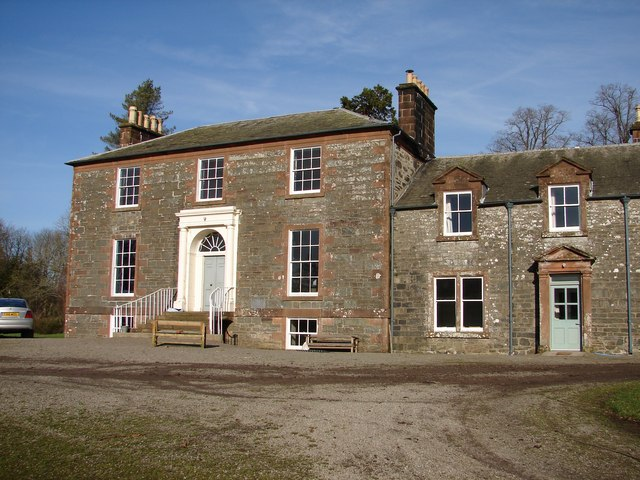
Kilquhanity House (1820), Kirkpatrick Durham

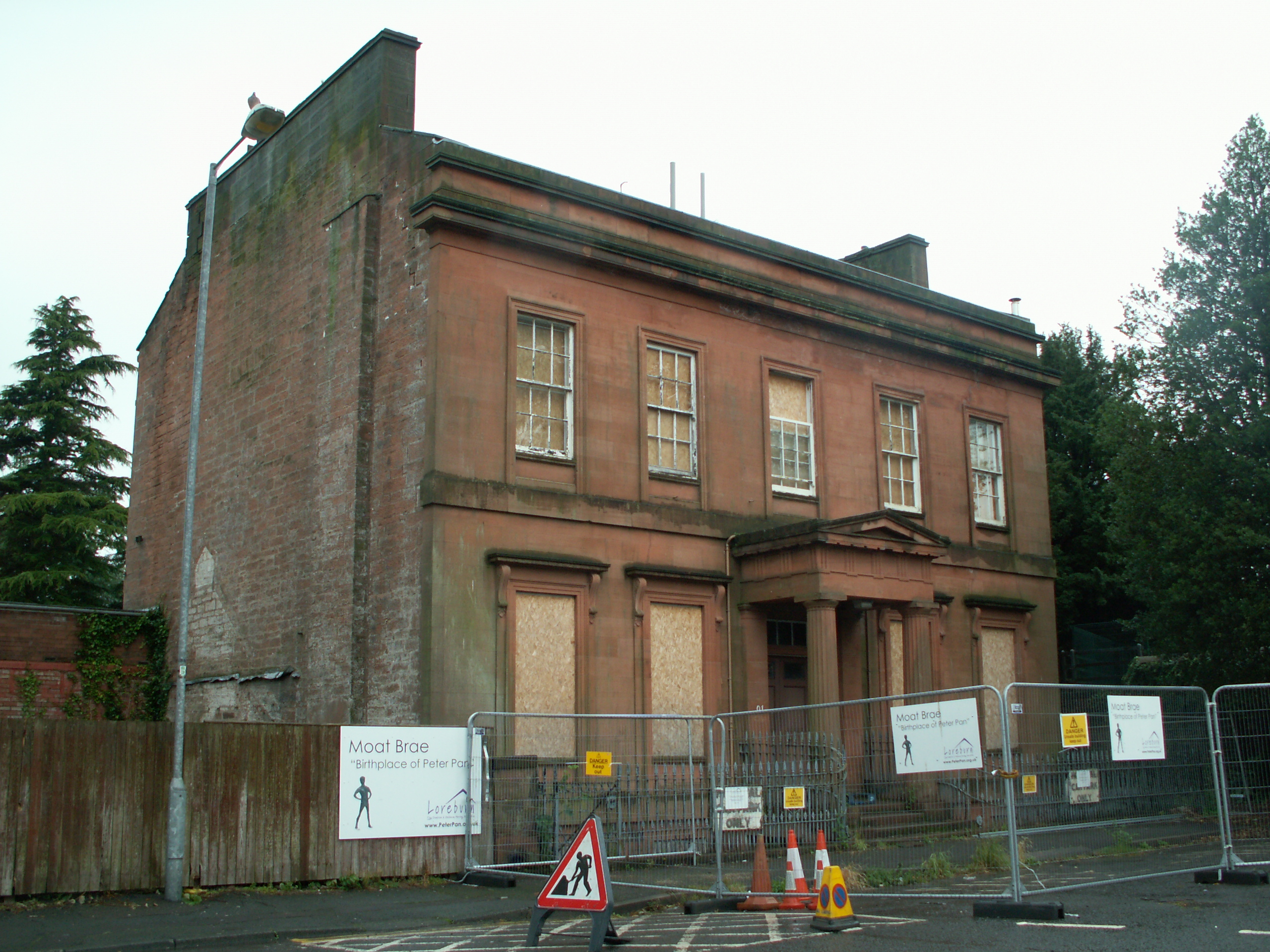
Moat Brae (1823), Dumfries

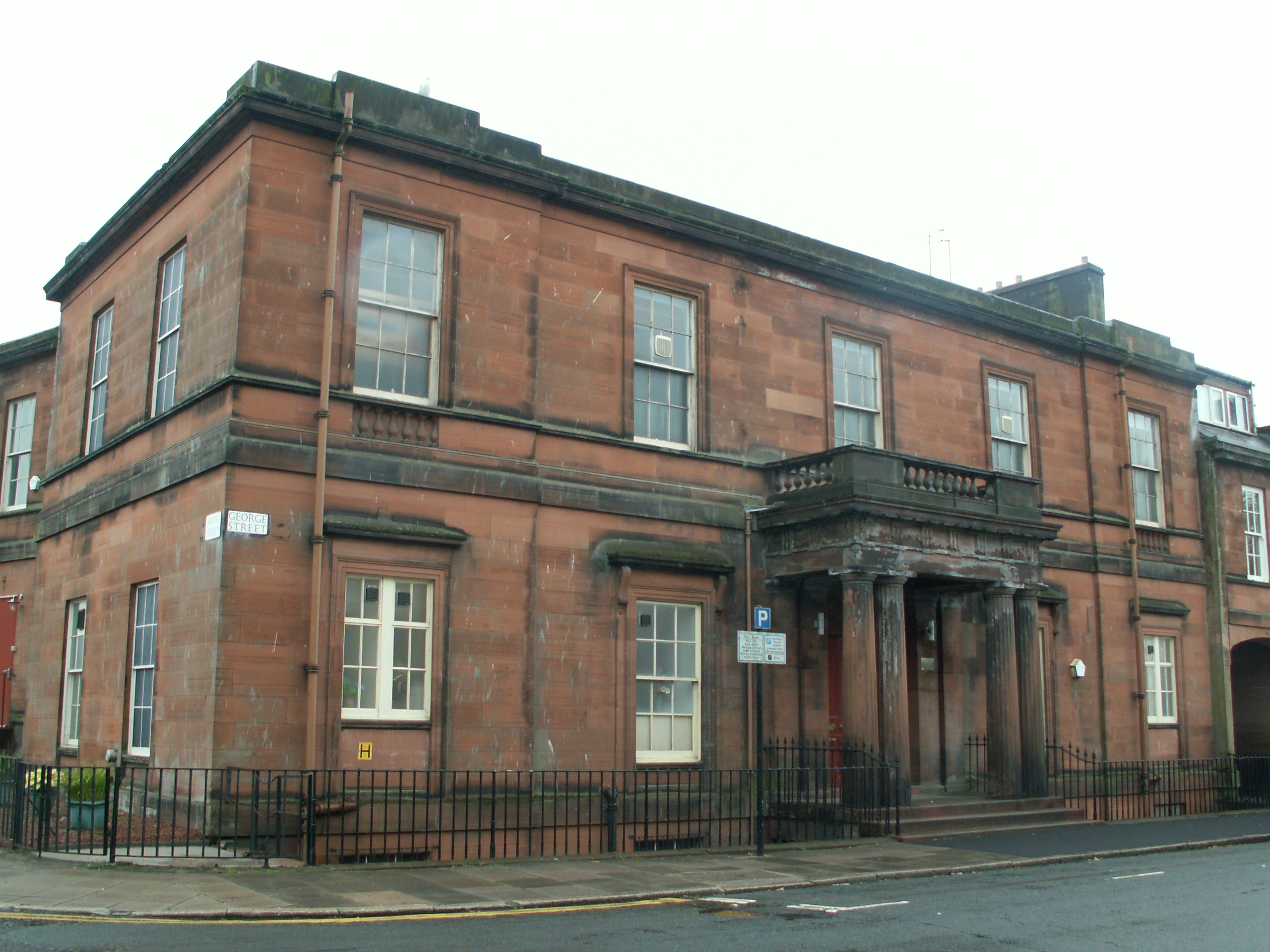
Assembly Rooms (1825), Dumfries

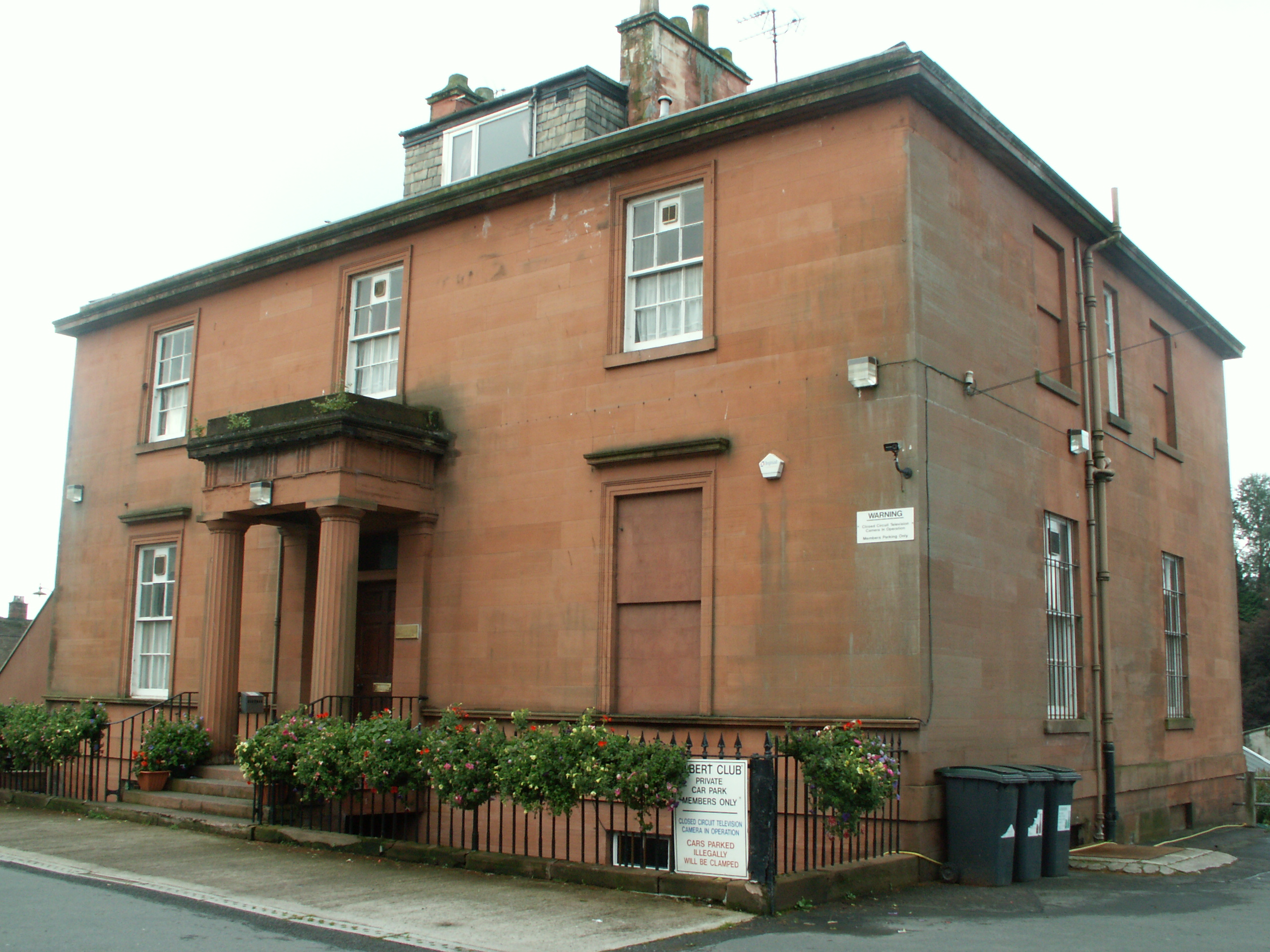
Nith House (1828), Irish Street, Dumfries (now the Albert Club)

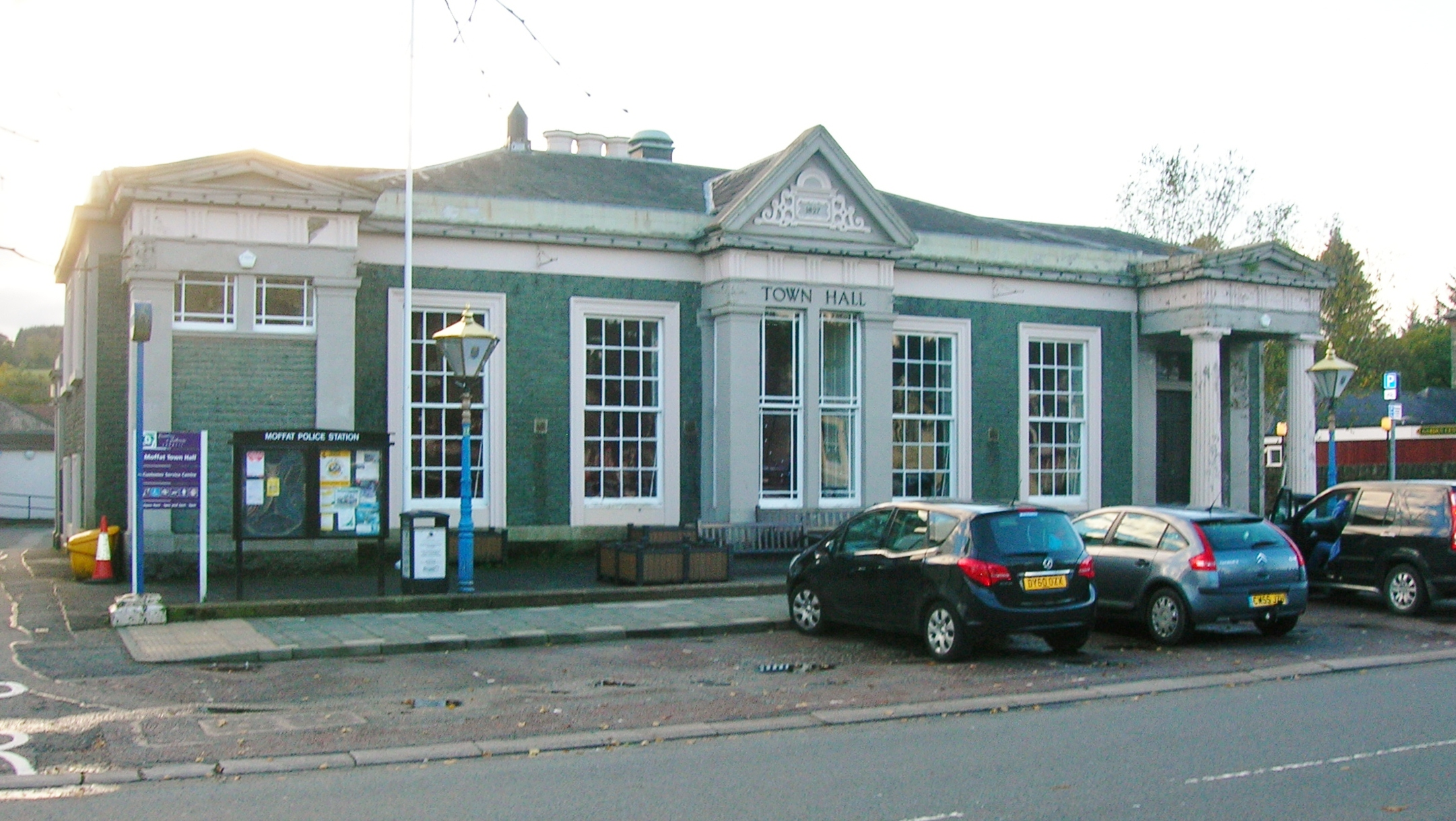
Moffat Town Hall (originally the Pump House & Baths)
