= Aberdeen Philosophical Society =

Learned society in Aberdeen

- Nickname: Wise Club
- Founded: 12 January 1758; 268 years ago
- Dissolved: 9 March 1773; 253 years ago
- Location: Aberdeen

The Aberdeen Philosophical Society (commonly known as the Wise Club) was a learned society based in Aberdeen in the second half of the 18th century. Holding its first meeting in the Old Red Lion Inn on 12 January 1758, it played a central role in the formation of the Scottish common sense realism.

== History ==
=== Background ===
Marischal College had been purged of a large section of its staff following the Jacobite rising of 1715, after which Thomas Blackwell was made principal; it was under his leadership that the Aberdeen Enlightenment (the rejection of seventeenth-century Cartesianism and Aristotelian Scholasticism) began. The college subsequently promoted the "Science of Men", creating an intellectual landscape that foreshadowed the society.

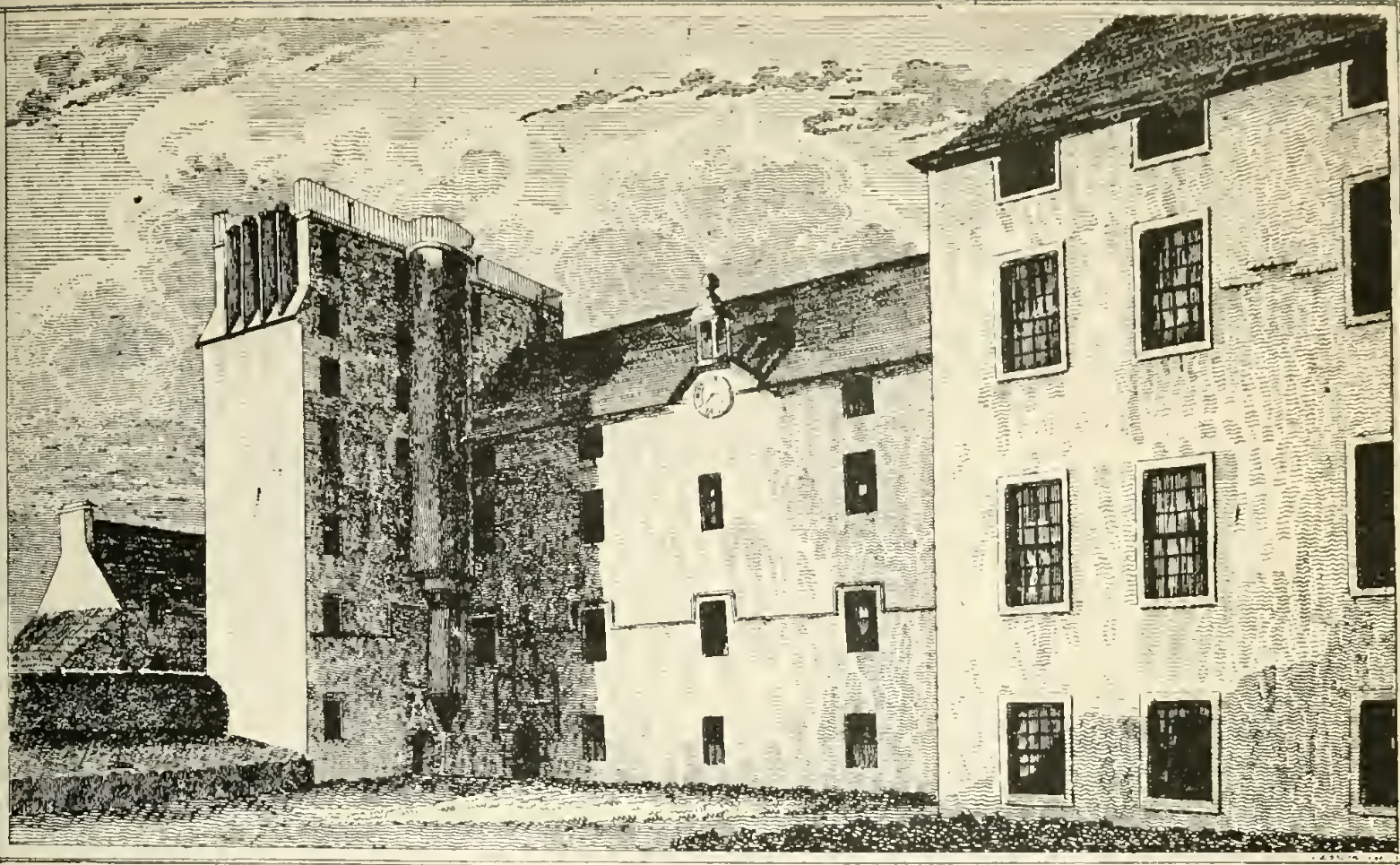
Marischal College's building in the 18th century

Several members of the society had previously been involved with other clubs; Thomas Reid had been a member of a philosophical club at Marischal College that met in 1736, focusing on moral philosophy, however it probably survived for little more than a year. George Campbell had organised a theological club with two of his classmates, also at Marischal, in January 1742, which disbanded later in the decade. John Gregory had, alongside musician Francis Peacock, organised the longest lasting of these clubs, the Musical Society, which operated from January 1747 or 1748 until 1801. Other founding members included Reverend Professor Pollock, Peter Black, James Black, Andrew Tait, Francis Peacock and David Young.

=== Foundation ===
Founding members

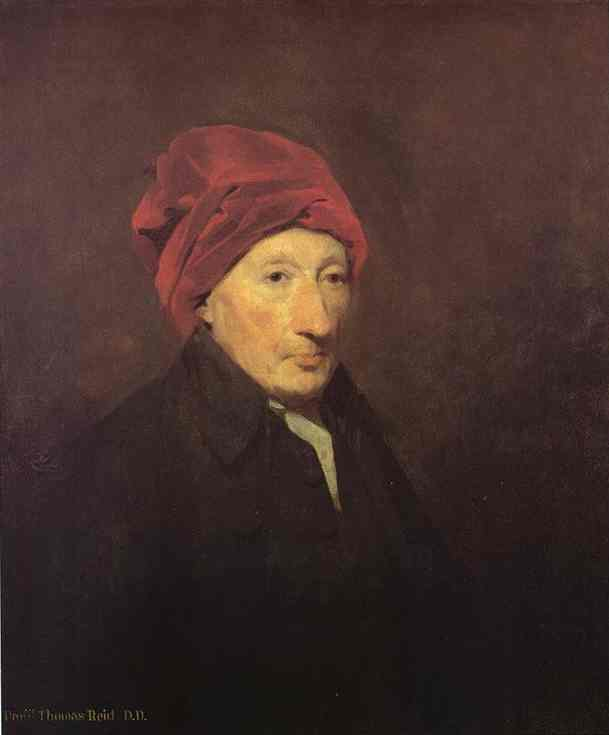
Thomas Reid

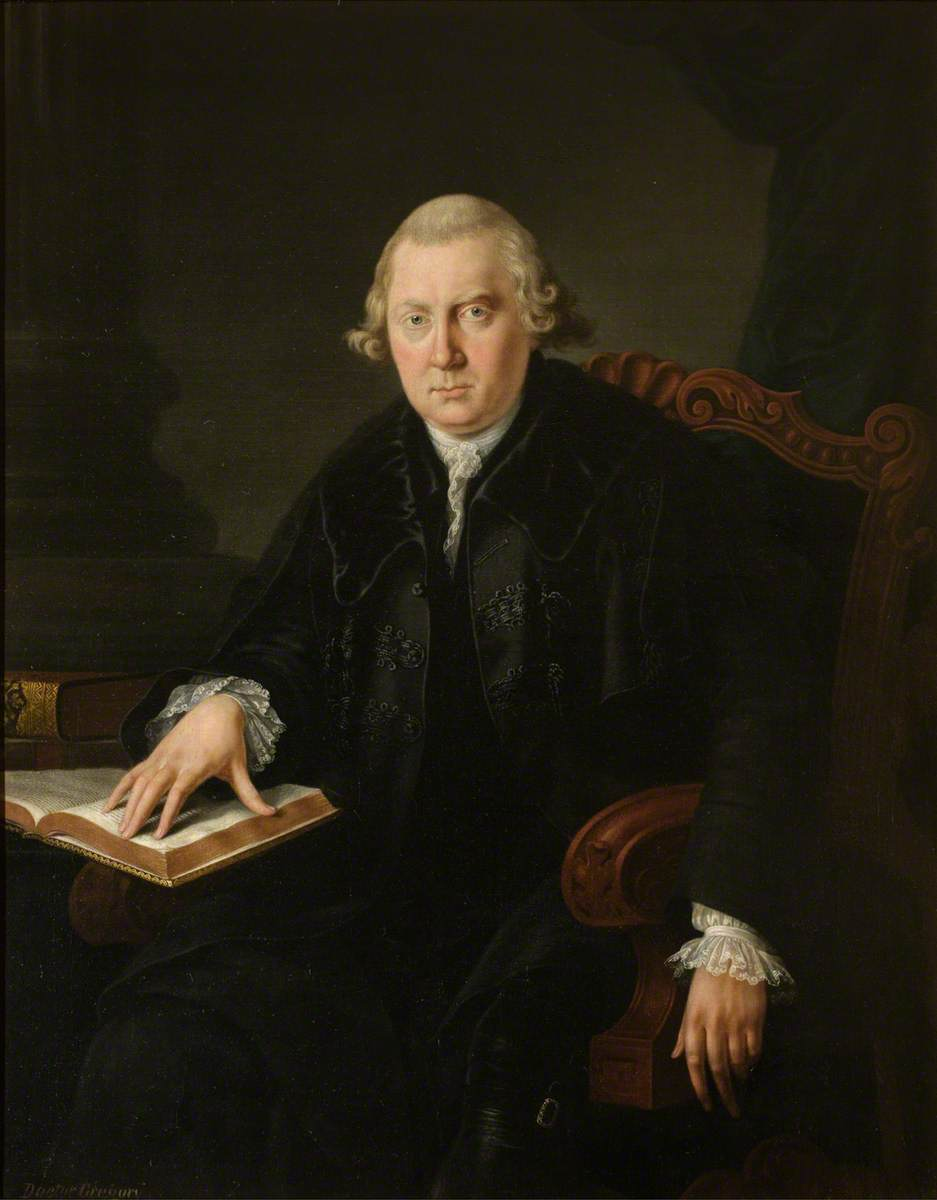
John Gregory

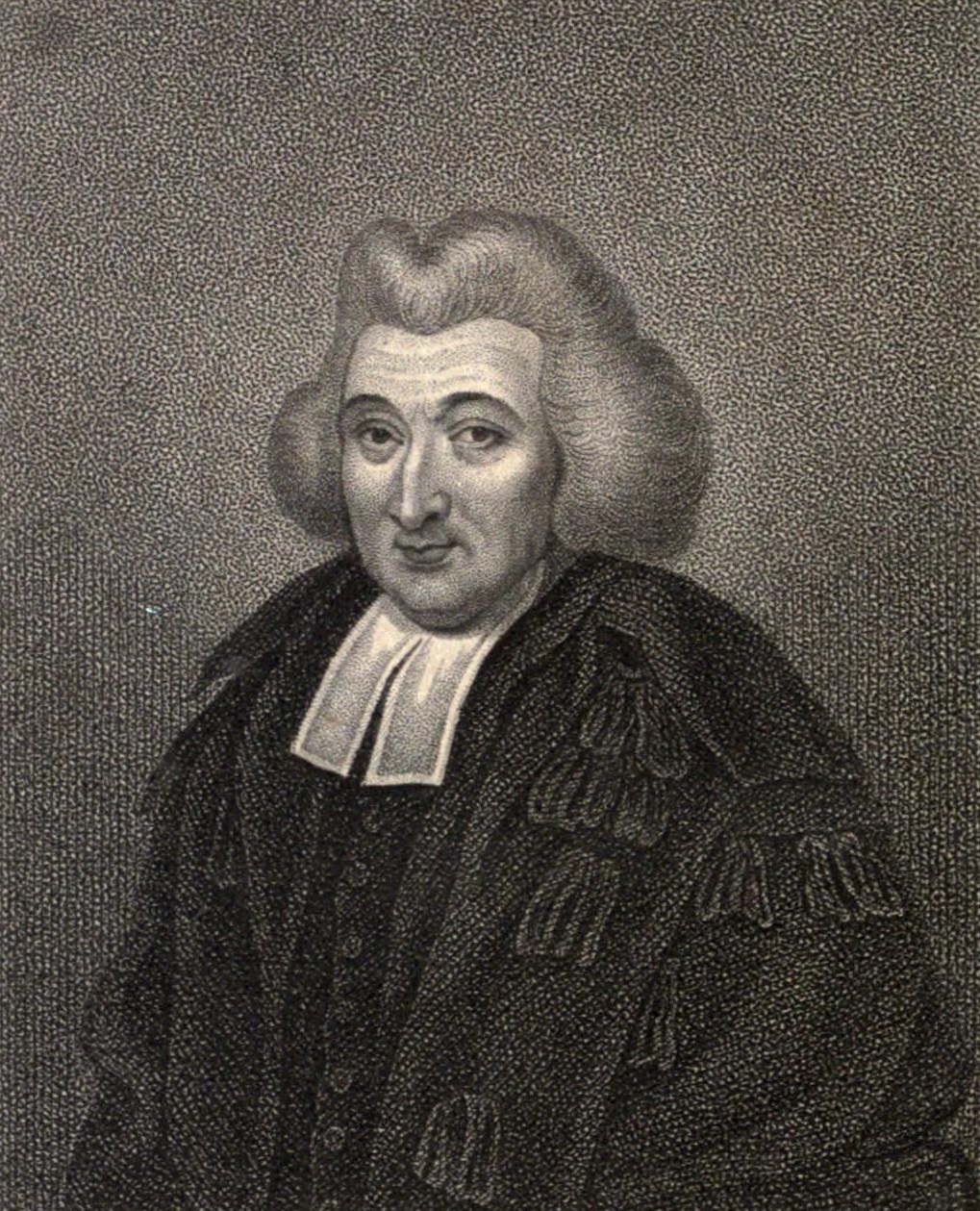
George Campbell

Portraits of three of the founding members

The society was created in 1758, with the founding members being Thomas Reid, George Campbell, David Skene, John Gregory, John Stewart, and Robert Traill. Its foundation appears to have been largely at the initiative of Reid, who was considerably older than the other members, and as such, took a lead amongst them, serving as president of the society. Reid was by then a regent at King's College, where Gregory was the Mediciner, while Stewart was professor of mathematics at Marischal College (Campbell joined him there as principal the following year). Skene had been involved in an attempt to found a medical school at King's College, later serving as a Dean of Faculty at Marischal. Skene was a botanist. Traill was the only founding member who did not have a university post, but he was minister of Banff. The first meeting of the society was held on 12 January 1758, at the Old Red Lion Inn.

Two months later, three additional members were elected, John Farquhar (professor of moral philosophy and logic at Marischal), Alexander Gerard (professor of classics at King's), and Thomas Gordon (professor of humanity at King's). The same year John Ross was elected, with James Beattie (Regius Professor of Moral Philosophy at Marischal) being elected in 1761. A small and private group, this exclusive nature differentiated it from the more socially inclusive and open societies, such as the Glasgow Literary Society and The Select Society of Edinburgh.

=== Activities ===
The society excluded the discussion of traditional scholarly fields, such as history, philology, and grammar, and instead limited itself to only philosophical subjects. Particularly, the anatomy of the mind, and how it related to morals, was discussed. The society often focused on attempting to refute the works of David Hume. New members were proposed, without application, often with the prospective member being unaware, and only permitted to join by unanimous suffrage, after which, if willing, he was admitted.

=== Decline ===
Several factors led to the society falling into a decline in the late 1760s, as several members either left or died, and the rivalry between Campbell and Gerard, once friendly, turned sour. As plans to unite King's and Marischal were revived in 1770, tensions between the two colleges escalated. Beattie, who was feeling increasingly unsettled in Aberdeen, turned back to his friends and patrons back in London for support. Attempts to revitalise the club took place in early 1773, however they proved unsuccessful, and it disbanded not long after; the last recorded meeting took place on 9 March 1773.

== Meetings ==
The society held meetings once a fortnight, on the second and fourth Wednesday of each month. Every other meeting was to begin with a "discourse or dissertation", which was not to exceed half an hour in length, with a subject and design that was related to the previous meeting. Following its reading, each member, in his order, "had access to make his observations in a free but candid and friendly manner." Discussions were limited, with "criticisms upon style, pronunciation, or composition" being avoided, as they were described as "foreign to the design of this Society." Each member was required to bring forth a discourse once a year.

On the alternative meetings, not began with a discourse, a question previously proposed by each member was "conversed upon", with the proposer of the question having access to speak first. No member was allowed to speak twice on the same question without permission from the President.

The nature of subjects, discourses and questions, as defined by Reid in the society's minute book, were as follows:

"The Subject of the Discourses and Questions shall be Philosophical; all Grammatical, Historical, and Philological Discussions being conceived to be foreign to the Design of the Society. And Philosophical Matters are understood to comprehend—Every Principle of Science which may be deduced by just and Lawful Induction from the Phaenomena either of the Human Mind or of the material World; All Observations and Experiments that may furnish Materials for Such Induction; The Examination of False Schemes of Philosophy and False Methods of Philosophizing; The Subserviency of Philosophy to Arts; the Principles they borrow from it and the Means of carrying them to their Perfection. If any Dispute should arise whether a Subject of a Discourse or a Question proposed falls within the Meaning and Intendment of this Article, it shall be determined by a Majority of the Members present."

Meetings combined both conviviality and serious intellectual discussion. Entertainment was provided as a relief from dissertations, on the rule that it should not exceed "eighteenpence a head".

== Legacy ==
Scholars of the Scottish Enlightenment have considered the society to be significant in tracing the evolution of several member's rhetorical thought, notably George Campbell.

The content of the sessions was preserved in Reid's "The Original Minutes of the Philosophical Society of Aberdeen", added to in 1982 with the release of Gordon's papers, which by that time were not in a good condition. The minutes of the society are preserved at the University of Aberdeen's library.

== Members ==
Members of the society included:

- Thomas Reid (January 1758 – 1764; left)
- George Campbell (January 1758 – 1773)
- David Skene (January 1758 – 1770; died), botanist
- John Gregory (January 1758 – 1764; left)
- John Stewart (January 1758 – 1766; died)
- Robert Traill (January 1758 – 1761; left)
- John Farquhar (March 1758 – 1768; died), parson of Nigg
- Alexander Gerard (March 1758 – 1773)
- Thomas Gordon (March 1758 – 1773)
- John Ross (1758–1773)
- James Beattie (1761–1773)
- George Skene (1761–1773)
- William Ogilvie (1763–1773), also member of the Glasgow Literary Society
- James Dunbar (1765–1773)
- William Trail (1766–1773)
- James Trail (November 1768; honorary member)

== Later society of the same name ==
In 1840, a new society also calling itself the Aberdeen Philosophical Society was founded. It lasted through to 1939, when it discontinued its meetings owing to the Second World War.
