= Thomas Gordon (philosopher) =

Thomas Gordon FRSE (1714-1797) was a Scottish philosopher, mathematician and antiquarian. He was Professor of Humanity at King's College, Aberdeen. He was a co-founder of the Royal Society of Edinburgh in 1783.

== Life ==
He was the son of Prof. George Gordon, Professor of Hebrew at King's College in Aberdeen. His grandfather, also George Gordon was Principal of the College in 1684. Thomas attended University of Aberdeen, graduating MA in 1731. He thereafter held various positions at the College from Regent to Professor of Greek and Philosophy.

He was a member of the Aberdeen Philosophical Society from 1758 to 1773, and was one of the most active members of the Society, serving as secretary from 1761 - 1764 and again from 1767 - 1771. Here he debated with its founders Prof John Gregory, Prof Robert Trail and Dr David Skene, and other members such as Prof Alexander Gerard.

He taught Robert Eden Scott (1770-1811) (later Prof R E Scott), his grandson, at the College.

He died on 11 March 1797.

== Family ==
His second daughter Margaret died in 1797.

His daughter Anna married Rev. Andrew Brown (d.1805).

His daughter Elizabeth was the mother of Robert Eden Scott.
