= Greyfriars Church, Aberdeen =

Historic building in Aberdeen, Scotland

Coordinates: 57°08′55″N 2°05′45″W

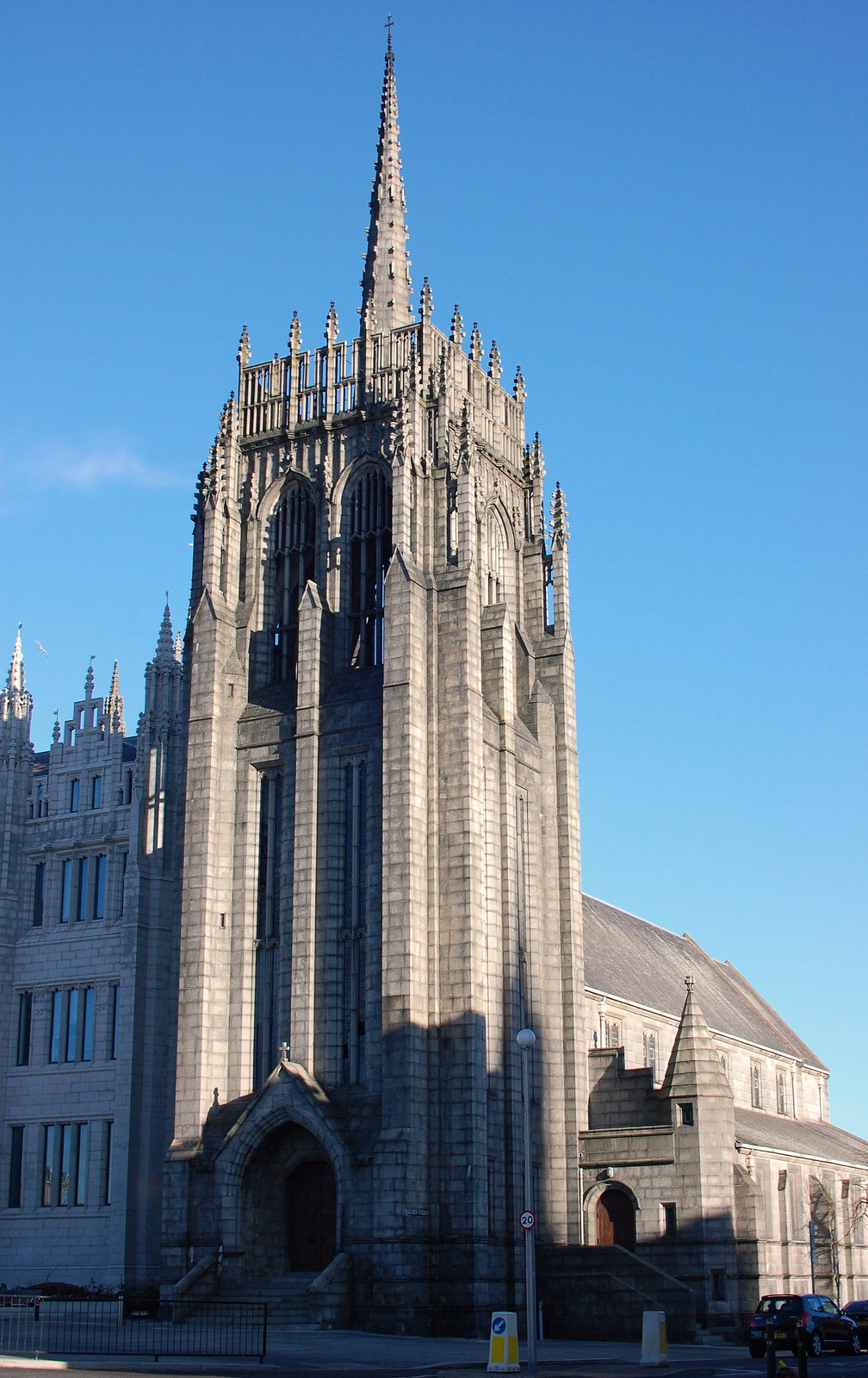
Greyfriars Church

Greyfriars Church (also known as Greyfriars John Knox Church) is a Category A Listed building in Aberdeen, Scotland. It was designed by the architect Alexander Marshall Mackenzie and built in 1903. It is situated on Broad Street and forms the south-east corner of Marischal College, also designed by Mackenzie.

== History ==
A priory was built in the area in 1469. Around 1525 Bishop Dunbar started the construction of a new church. This was completed and occupied in 1532 in Pre-Reformation days by Franciscan monks. It was retained for Protestant worship after the Reformation, but the monastery element was demolished to create Marischal College, which was attached to the church, in 1593.

In 1605, 1616 and 1640 the General Assembly of the Church of Scotland was held here (rather than its usual venue in Edinburgh). In 1749 the church was redesignated as a chapel-of-ease to the Kirk of St Nicholas, a status which continued until 1828.

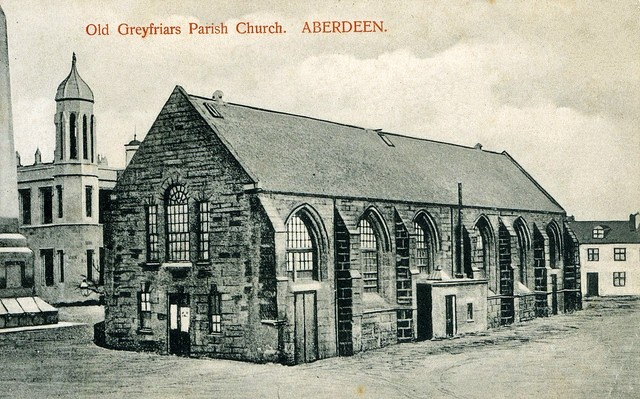
Postcard of the old Greyfriars Church

The original church was demolished to make room for extensions to Marischal College, and after negotiations with the town council, in 1903 Mackenzie built the new church in the same perpendicular gothic style as the college extension.

As of 2010, the building was unused and was being offered for sale by the Church of Scotland for commercial or residential use. In 2018, the building's granite façade was cleaned.

== Notable ministers ==
Due to the physical connection between the buildings, many ministers also served concurrently as Principal of Marischal College.

- Robert Barron 1624 to 1635
- Thomas Blackwell 1711 to 1728
- Robert Pollock 1745 to 1760
- Rev Prof Alexander Gerard 1760 to 1771
- Rev Dr George Campbell 1771 to 1795
- William Laurence Brown
- Daniel Dewar 1814 to 1819
