= Robert Baron =

Robert Baron may refer to:

- Robert Baron (theologian) (1596–1639), Scottish theologian
- Robert A. Baron (born 1943), American psychologist
- Robert Baron (poet) (1630–?), English poet and dramatist

== See also ==
- Robert Barron (disambiguation)
