= Moat Brae =

Townhouse in Dumfries, Scotland

Coordinates: 55.0716°N 3.6131°W

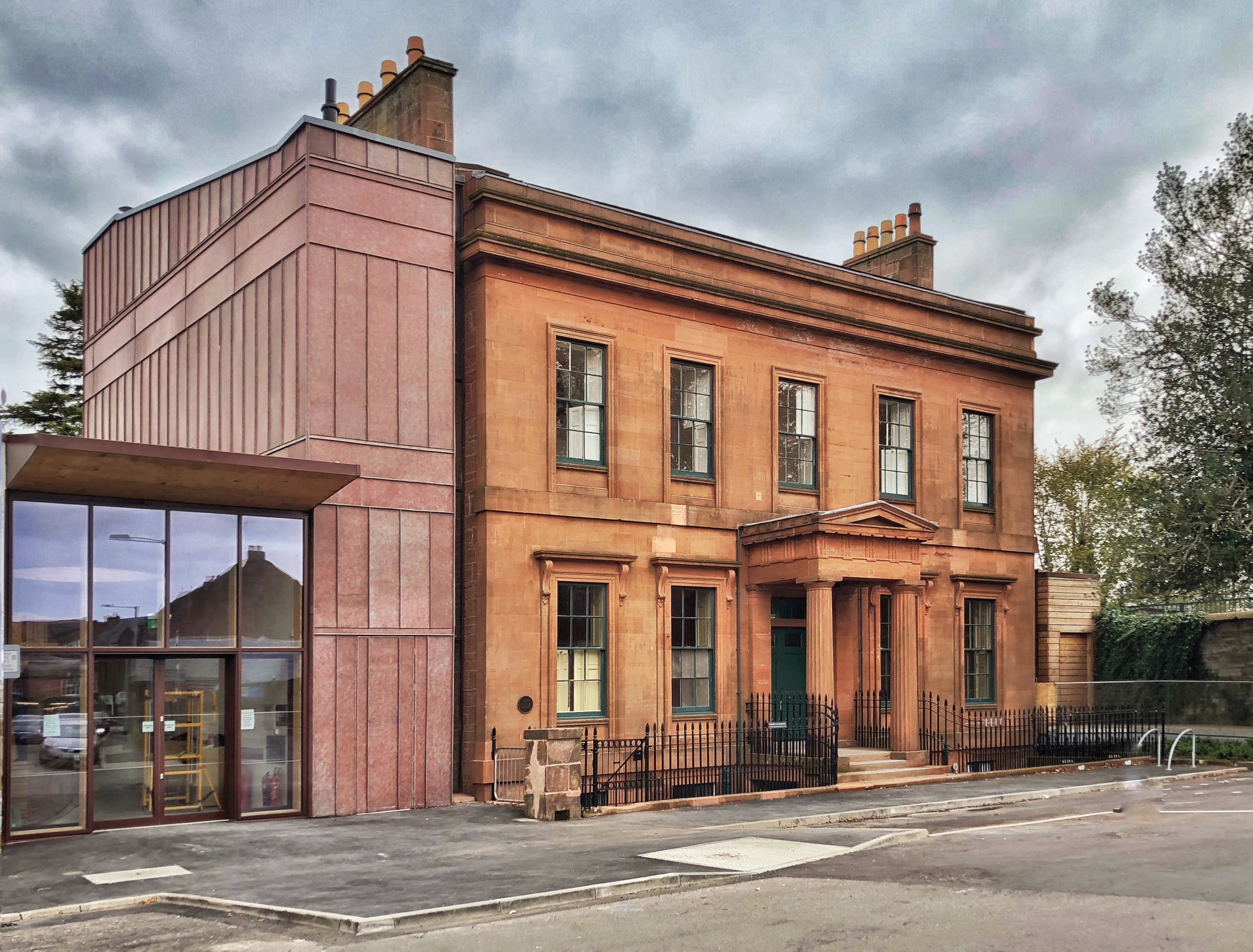
Moat Brae in 2019

Moat Brae is a Georgian townhouse designed by Walter Newall in Dumfries, Scotland. It was built in 1823 in the Greek revival style. J. M. Barrie, creator of Peter Pan, played in the house and garden as a child from the ages of 13-18 whilst at school at Dumfries Academy. Barrie was later presented with the Freedom of the Burgh of Dumfries in 1924 and in his speech said "When Shades of night began to fall certain young mathematicians shed their triangles and crept up trees and down walls in an odyssey which was long after to become the play of Peter Pan. For our escapades in a certain Dumfries garden, which is enchanted land to me, were certainly the genesis of that nefarious work."

In 1961 the building was granted Category B listed building status, as a classic example of Newall's work. In 2019 Moat Brae opened as Peter Pan's Enchanted Land and a National Centre for Children's Literature and Storytelling; the centre closed for financial reasons in 2024.

== Design ==
Moat Brae is a medium-scale Greek revival villa, rising to two storeys with a raised basement and extending to five bays. It was one of the first houses to be built in what became George Street, Dumfries, and it occupied a large plot of ground that sloped down to the River Nith.

The house is built of polished red ashlar. The roof is slate with corniced end stacks. The front elevation features a central pedimented Doric porch, approached via flyover steps and with spearheaded cast-iron railings adjoining. The house has 12-pane sash windows trimmed in apron-style moulding throughout; those on the ground floor are topped with consoled cornices. The plasterwork features Greek revival ornament, and there is a Doric frieze in the entrance lobby. The interior features—a square central hall with a circular first floor gallery and a domed glass roof—make this one of Newall's greatest works.

== Ownership ==
Between 1823 and 1914, the house was sold a number of times as a traditional residence. In 1914 it was purchased by The Royal Scottish Nursing Home Institution and, until 1997, financed through various trusts, remained in constant use as a nursing home complete with private facilities for surgery and medicine.

In 2001 it was again bought privately with the plan to turn it into a hotel. However this never transpired and, in 2008, the building was purchased by Loreburn Housing Association. In 2009 there were plans to demolish the house, but days before it was due to be razed the house and garden were purchased for £75,000 by the Peter Pan Moat Brae Trust.

== Peter Pan Moat Brae Trust ==
The Trust was established to save and restore the house and garden and to develop them as Scotland's first Centre for Children's Literature. To do this the Trust raised over £6m from various funding bodies, foundations and private individuals. Its fundraising campaign was launched in August 2011 by the Trust's patron, Joanna Lumley. That month, Scottish Culture Secretary Fiona Hyslop announced a grant of £250,000 from Historic Scotland to help in the restoration of the building. Historic Scotland provided further restoration funds in subsequent years, and the National Heritage Lottery Fund and Creative Scotland also contributed funding. A land deal was concluded between Dumfries and Galloway Council and the Moat Brae Trust, whereby council-owned land that runs alongside the River Nith behind Dumfries Academy was sold to the Trust for £1. The council has said it has no use for the land but recognises its importance for the work of the Trust to develop a Centre for Children's Literature.

Moat Brae opened to the public as the National Centre for Children's Literature and Storytelling on 1 June 2019. Moat Brae is also home to the library of the Arthur Ransome Society.

In August 2024, Moat Brae was closed due to financial difficulties; the following month, the property was put up for bid. Dumfries and Galloway Council and other grantors seek to recover funds they provided for the Centre for Children's Literature.
