= Robert James Brown (moderator) =

Scottish minister (1792–1872)

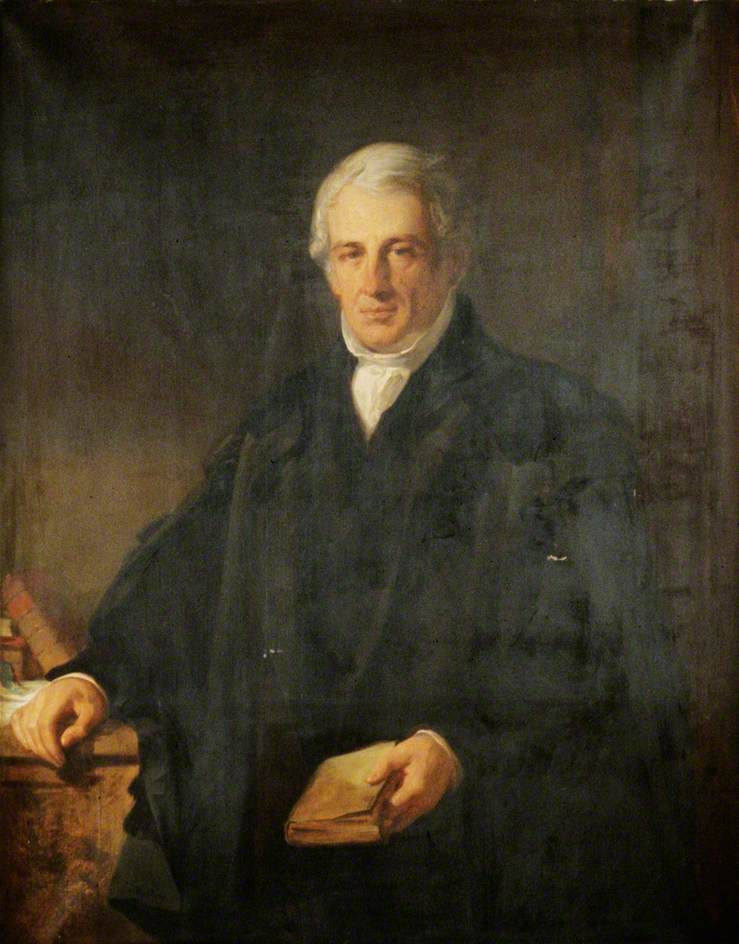
- Robert James Brown by John Phillip
- Church: Drumblade

Personal details
- Born: 23 December 1792 Utrecht, Netherlands
- Died: 7 December 1872 (aged 79) Aberdeen, Scotland
- Education: Marischal College, Aberdeen

Robert James Brown (23 December 1792 – 7 December 1872) was a Scottish minister, who served as Moderator of the General Assembly for the Free Church of Scotland 1846/47. He was familiarly known by his students as the Dorian.

== Life ==
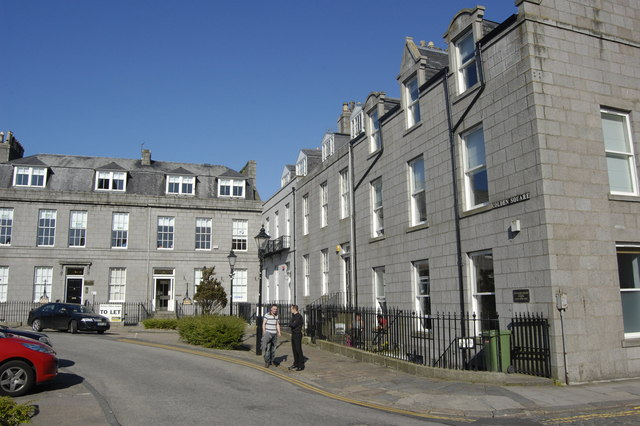
Golden Square, Aberdeen

He was born in Utrecht in the Netherlands on 23 December 1792 the third son of Rev Dr William Laurence Brown (1755–1830), sometime Professor of Divinity at Aberdeen, and his wife, Ann Elizabeth Brown (William's first cousin). He studied Divinity under his father at Marischal College in Aberdeen.

He was licensed to preach by the Church of Scotland in 1812. He was ordained into the church at Drumblade in 1821. In 1827, he was appointed Professor of Greek at Marischal College in Aberdeen. He was given an honorary doctorate (DD) in 1834.

In 1843, he left the established Church of Scotland and joined the Free Church. He retained his professorship at Aberdeen. In 1846, he was elected Moderator of the General Assembly in succession to Rev Patrick MacFarlan. He was succeeded in turn in 1847 by the Rev James Sievewright.

Brown died in Aberdeen, on 7 December 1872, aged 79, and was buried beside his wife at Nellfied Cemetery.

== Family ==
He married 26 April 1828, Jane (died s.p. 1 January 1854, aged 65), daughter of William Stronach, minister of Marnoch.

== Bibliography ==
- Aberdeen Journal Notes and Queries, ii. 139, iv. 205
- Records of Marischal College, ii. 49 [where the date of his marriage is wrongly given as 14 September 1829]
- Memorial in Greyfriars United Free Church, Aberdeen [where the date of his death is erroneously given as 7 October]
- Aberdeen Free Press, 9 December 1872

== Artistic recognition ==
He was photographed by Hill & Adamson around 1844.
