= Robert Barron (minister) =

Scottish academic

Robert Barron (1596–1639) was a Scottish academic who was elected Bishop of Orkney in the Church of Scotland but died before his consecration. He was the first Professor of Divinity at Marischal College.

== Life ==
Barron was born in Kinnaird, a younger son of John Barron of Kinnaird. He was educated at the University of St Andrews graduating MA in 1613 and being elected a regent in Old College.

In 1619, Barron was ordained as a Church of Scotland minister in the parish of Keith. In 1624 he translated to Greyfriars Church, Aberdeen and in December 1625 took on the additional role as Professor of Divinity at Marischal College. He was created a Doctor of Divinity by King's College, Aberdeen in 1627.

In 1638, Barron vocally opposed the National Covenant. This was, in part, caused by his hope to achieve the post of Bishop of Orkney which at that time lay vacant, and for which King Charles I had given Barron support. He never returned to Aberdeen but lived his final months in Berwick-upon-Tweed, having fallen ill en-route, and he died there on 19 August 1639, prior to his agreed consecration as Bishop.

After his death his wife was forced to pass government officials the key to his quarters at Marischal College and his rooms were ransacked in a manner as though he was to have been charged with Arminianism.

== Family ==
He was married to Jean Gibson (b.c. 1600) of Strathisla. They had four children including Jean Barron, who married Alexander Strachan of Birse.

== Publications ==
- Philosophia Theologia Ancillans (Andreapoli 1621, Oxford 1641)
- Thesus Theologica (1630)
- On the Arrival of King Charles in Scotland (1633)
