= Corsock =

Village in Dumfries and Galloway, Scotland

Coordinates: 55°4′0.88″N 3°56′39.66″W

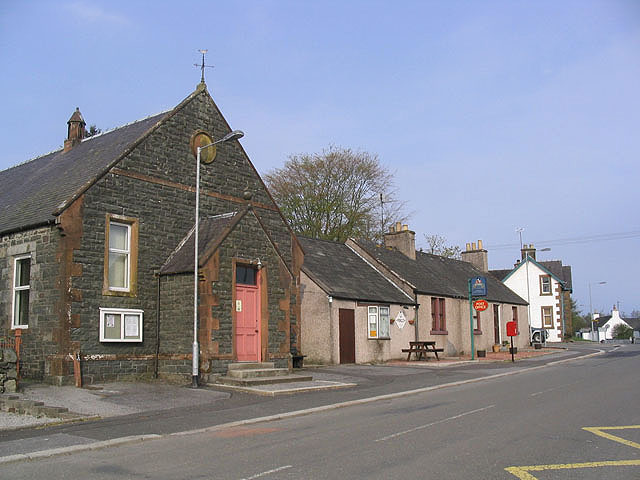
Corsock Village Hall

Corsock (Scottish Gaelic: Carsag, lit. 'little carse or marsh') is a village in the historical county of Kirkcudbrightshire, Dumfries and Galloway, south-west Scotland. It is located 8 miles (13 km) north of Castle Douglas, and the same distance east of New Galloway, on the Urr Water.

Corsock House is an 18th-century country house remodelled by David Bryce in 1853. A later addition was made by Charles Stuart Still Johnston in 1910. The gardens are open to the public under the Scotland's Garden Scheme each Spring.

Corsock Church was built as a Free Church in 1851-52 by local architect William McCandlish. It was extended in 1912 with a Gothic stone arch and chancel by J.A. McGregor.

== Etymology ==
Corsock is a Cumbric name formed with the adjectival suffix -awg and either cors 'reeds, rushes, sedge' or crois 'cross'. If formed from cors it may have been an early name for the upper part of the Urr, meaning 'reedy place'. If formed from crois it would mean either 'place with a cross' or 'crossing place'.
