= Glenlair House =

Coordinates: 55°01′44″N 3°56′34″W

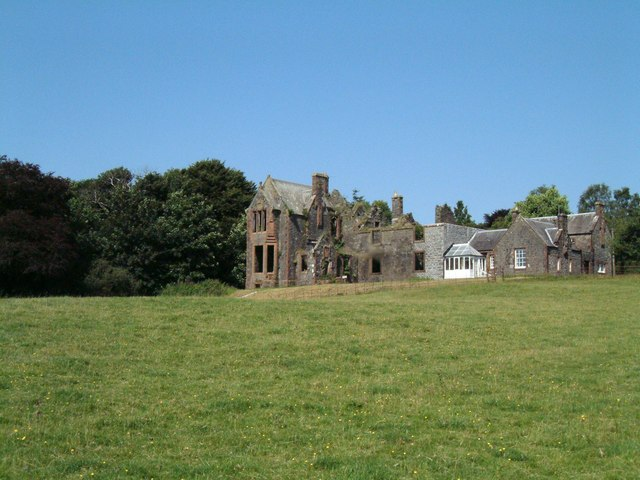
Glenlair, Parton, Kirkcudbrightshire, Galloway. Photo by Stuart Reid

Glenlair, near the village of Corsock in the historical county of Kirkcudbrightshire, in Dumfries and Galloway, was the home of the physicist James Clerk Maxwell (1831–1879). The original structure was designed for Maxwell's father by Walter Newall; Maxwell himself oversaw the construction of an extension in the late 1860s, and further improvements were made by his heir, Andrew Wedderburn-Maxwell. A fire in 1929 left the house gutted, but a project to preserve and stabilise the remains has been undertaken by the Maxwell at Glenlair Trust.
