= Woodside Hotel, Kenilworth =

Building in Warwickshire, England

Coordinates: 52.3445°N 1.5492°W

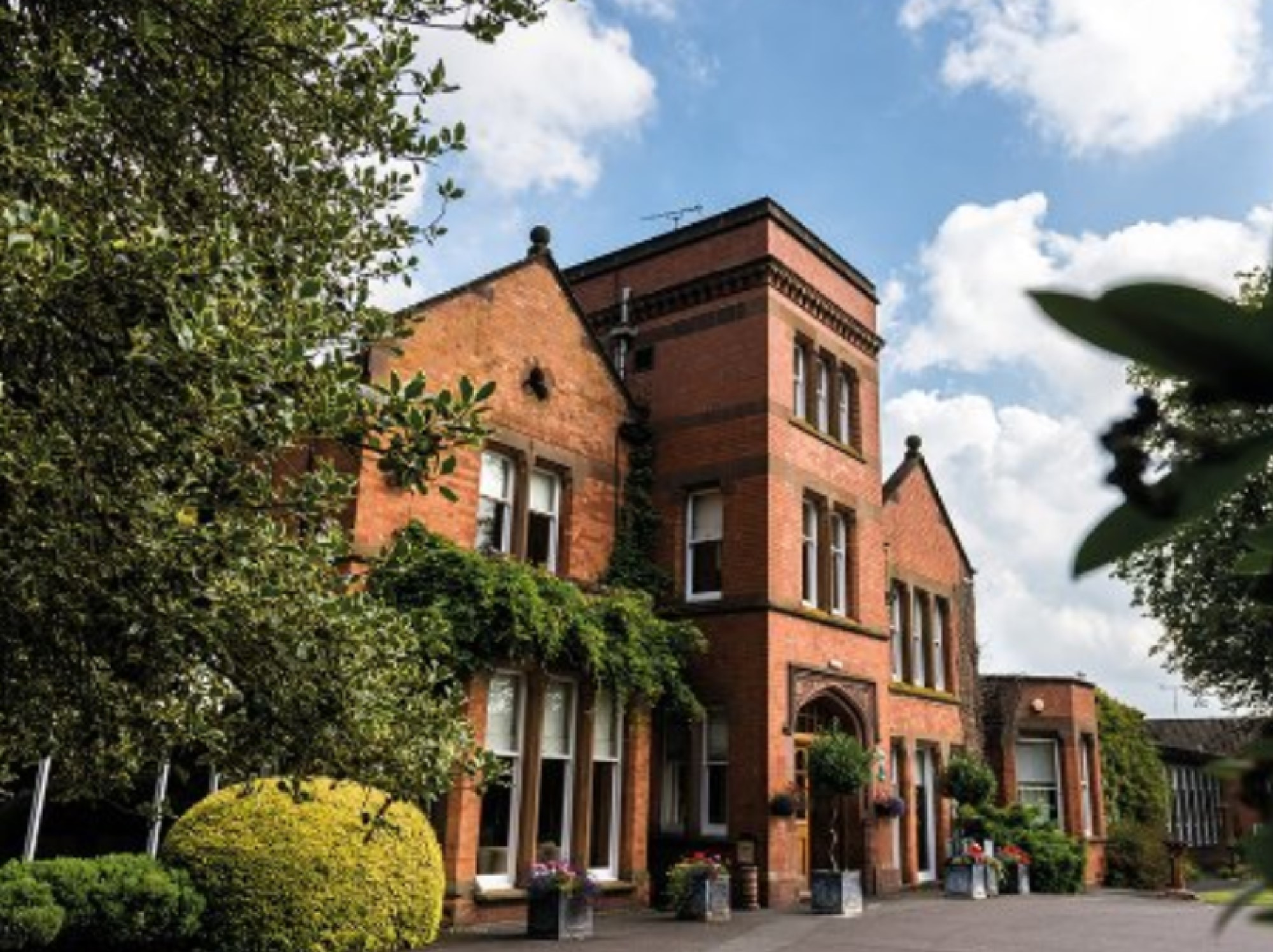
Woodside Hotel

The Woodside Hotel is a building of historical significance in Kenilworth, Warwickshire, England. It was the residence of several notable people from about 1860, including William Sands Cox. it was a hotel which offered accommodation, restaurant facilities and catering for special events but it is now permanently closed.

== Early residents ==
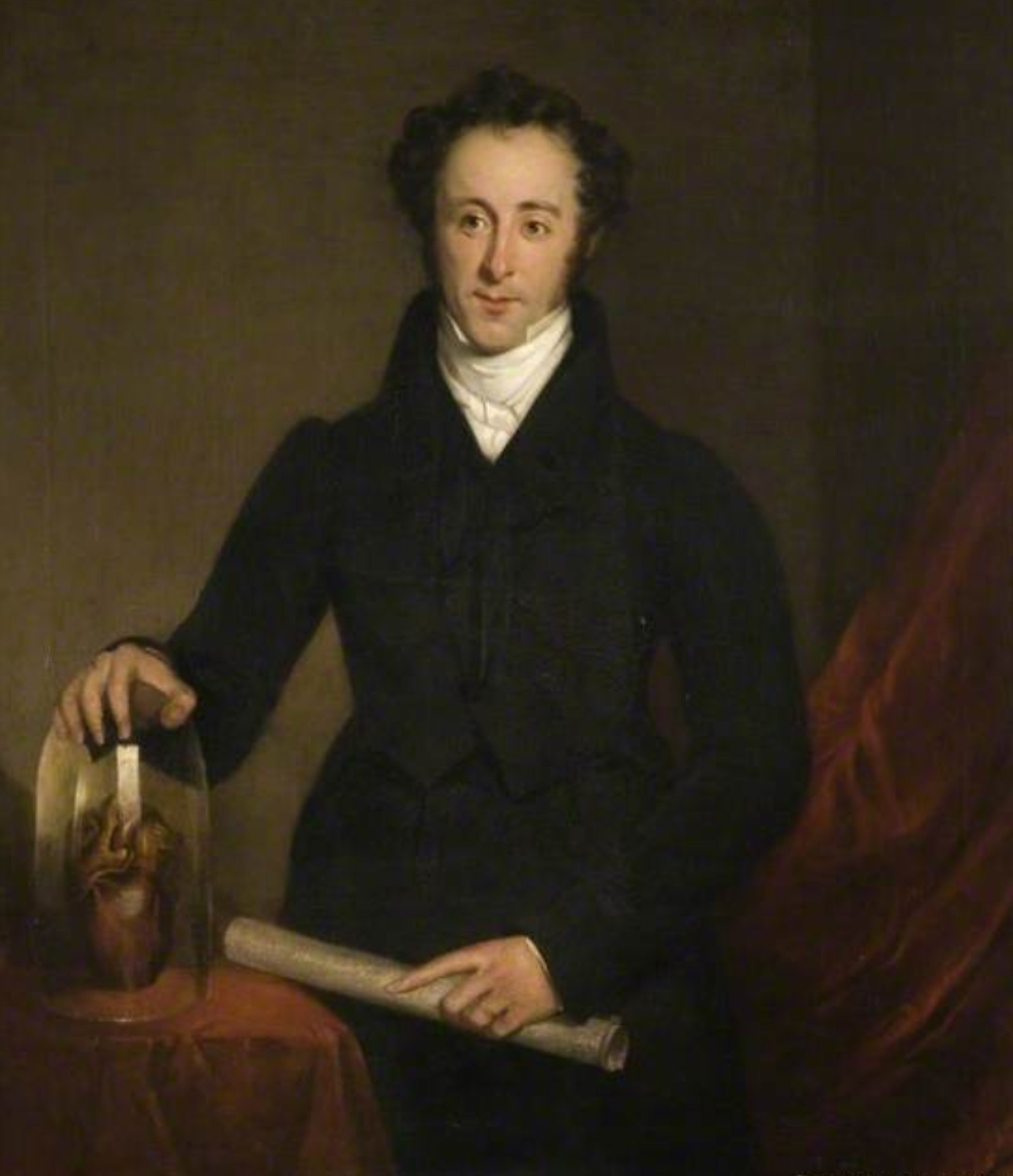
William Sands Cox

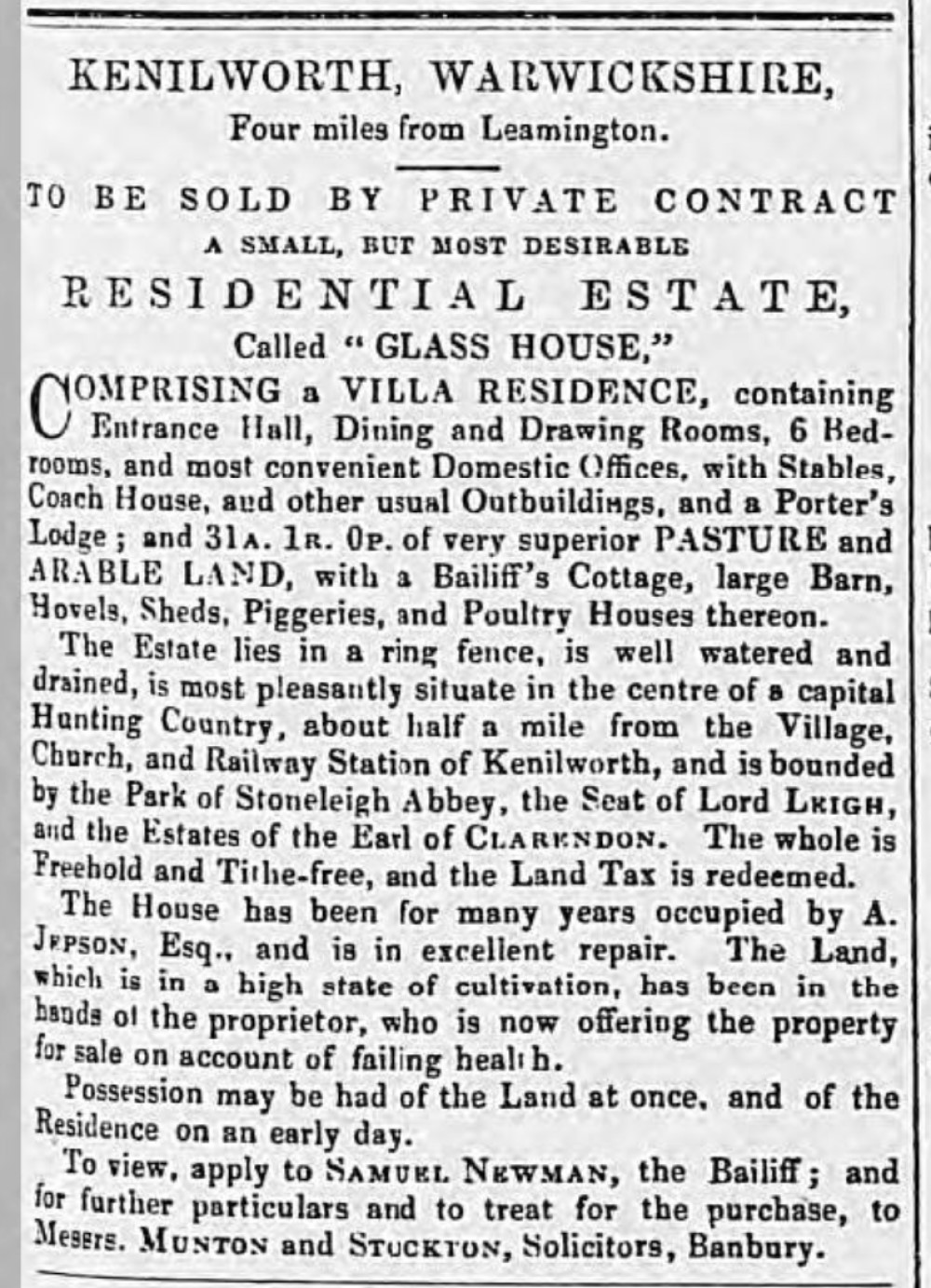
Sale Notice for "Glass House" now the Woodside Hotel in 1872

Before 1873 Woodside was called "Glass House" and belonged to William Hitchcock (1790–1873), a wealthy landowner from Leamington Spa. He owned the Glass House Estate from 1857, so it is possible that he built Woodside at about that time.

William Hitchcock was born at Hinton House in Woodford Halse in 1790. His father, George Hitchcock (1756–1836), owned many properties in this area and in Horley, Oxfordshire. William never married and lived for some time in Banbury. However, the 1861 census shows that by that year he had moved to Portland Place in Leamington Spa.

From 1868 until 1873, Albert Jepson, the father of the writer Edgar Jepson, was the tenant of "Glass House". William advertised the 31-acre property for sale in 1872, and when he died in 1873 it was advertised again by his heirs.

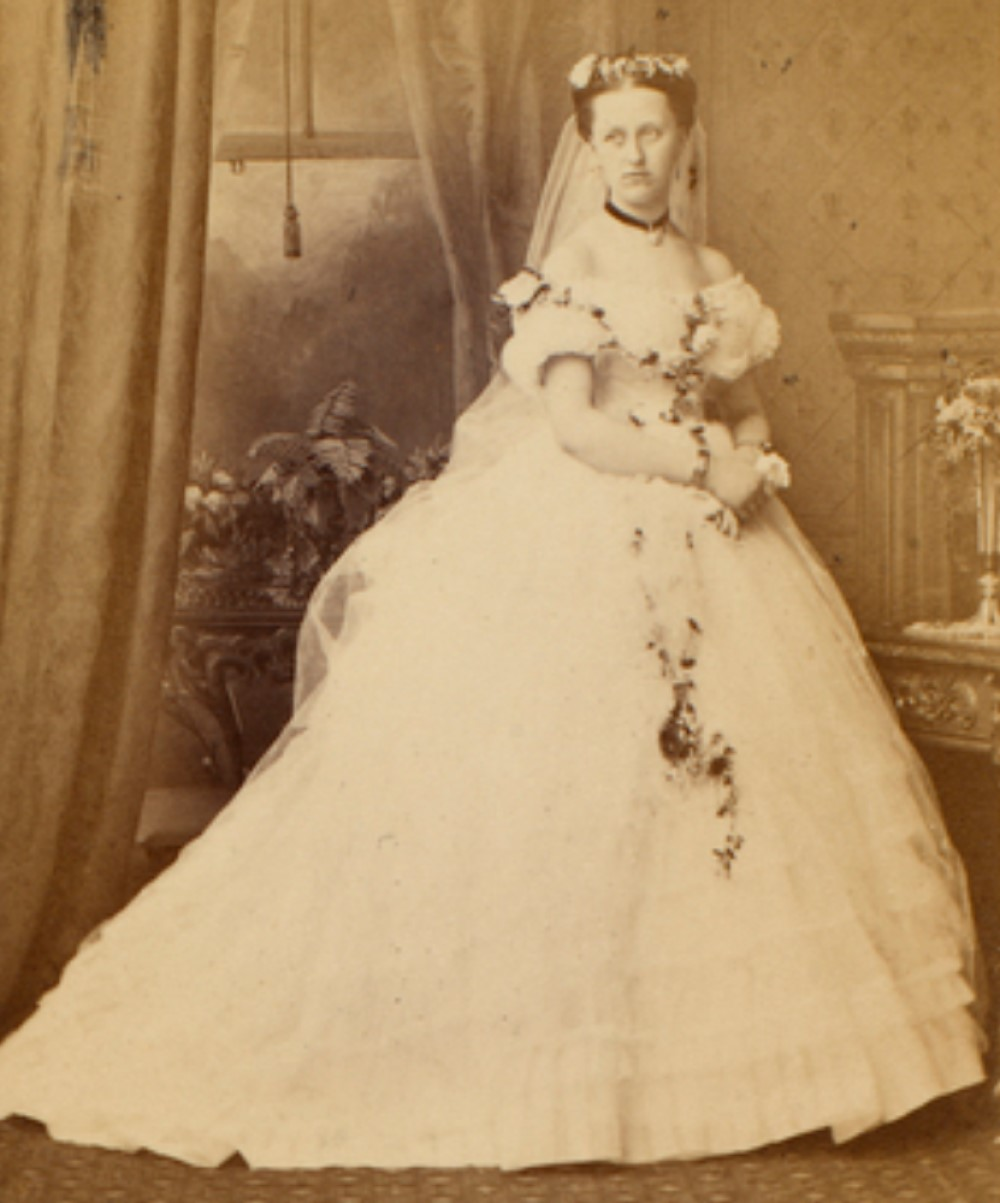
Lady Alexandrina Victoria Murray wife of Rev Henry Cunliffe in her bridesmaid's attire for the wedding of Princess Helena 1866

William Sands Cox (1802–1875) bought the property in 1873. He was a notable surgeon from Birmingham. He became famous because he founded a prominent medical school and later established a hospital. He did not wed Isabella Lichfield (1812–1885) until 1866, when he was 64 years old. However, he seems to have courted her for a very long time as a love letter exists from 1830. The couple moved into the house in about 1873 and renamed it Woodside. However, it was still occasionally called "Glass House". He died in 1875 and left the property to Isabella. She remained there until her death in 1885. Her nephew William Matthews was the heir, and he advertised it for sale in the same year.

It was bought by James Randles (1836–1901) in February 1886. He was a merchant from Natal, South Africa, who had recently returned after 25 years. His wife was Mary Heighway, daughter of James Heighway, an accountant of Church Streeton. In 1888 they returned to Natal, where he died in 1901. The house was bought by the Reverend Henry Cunliffe.

Reverend Henry Cunliffe (1826–1894) was the third son of Sir Robert Henry Cunliffe, 4th Baronet, of Acton Park. From 1852 until 1884 he was the Vicar of Shifnal, Shropshire. In 1853 he married Mary Augusta, only daughter of Sir James Milles Riddell, 2nd Baronet. She died in 1879, and he then married in 1887 Alexandrina Victoria Murray (1845–1911), third and youngest daughter of Alexander Murray, 6th Earl of Dunmore. Shortly after their marriage the couple moved to Woodside.

Lady Alexandrina Victoria Murray was a friend of the royal family and in 1866 she was one of the bridesmaids of Princess Helena, the daughter of Queen Victoria. One of the royal albums contains a picture of her dressed in her bridesmaid's attire. This is shown. There is a portrait of the Royal Wedding by Christian Karl Magnussen which shows the bride and the bridesmaids which can be seen at this reference. In 1889 Henry sold Woodside to Albert Cay.

== Later residents ==
Albert Cay (1846–1921) was a member of the Cay family of Charlton Hall. He was born there in 1846. He was the grandson of Judge Robert Hodshon Cay and Elizabeth Liddell, the painter. His uncle was John Cay, the pioneer photographer, and his cousin was James Clerk Maxwell, the scientist. He owned the firm James Stevens and Son, who were glass manufacturers in Birmingham. He also owned an estate in Northumberland.

In 1879 he married Annie Jaffray (1852–1941), who was the daughter of Sir John Jaffray, 1st Baronet, who was a newspaper proprietor. The couple had one son Albert Jaffray Cay, but unfortunately he died in Egypt in 1916 during the First World War. His name is on the Kenilworth War Memorial. Albert died in 1921, and Annie continued to live at Woodside for the next 20 years. She was very involved in community activities and gave generous donations to the Leamington Hospital and other institutions in Kenilworth. She died in 1941 at the age of 89.

After her death Courtaulds bought Woodside to house their office staff for the Central Accounts Department during the Second World War. In 1952 it became the Courtaulds Staff Training Centre. The property was sold by Courtaulds in 1997, when it was purchased by the Chudley family and opened in 1998 as a hotel. In 2020 the hotel was put up for sale and a year a later it was put into administration.
