= John Clerk Maxwell of Middlebie =

Scottish advocate

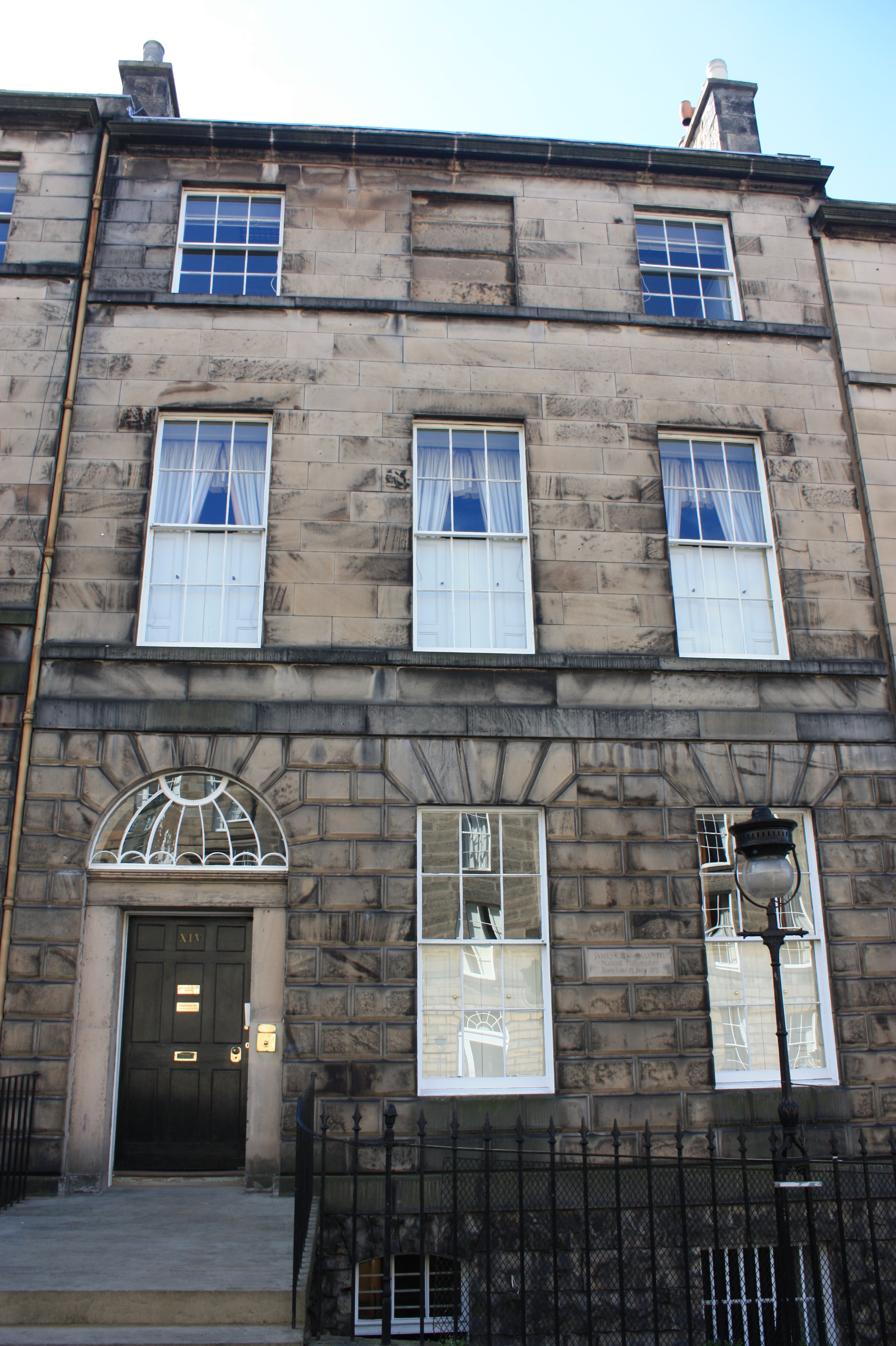
John Clerk Maxwell's house at 14 India Street

John Clerk (later Clerk Maxwell) of Middlebie FRSE (1790–1856) was a Scottish advocate and father of the mathematical physicist James Clerk Maxwell.

== Life ==
He was born in Edinburgh on 20 October 1790, the son of Janet Irving and Captain James Clerk. He studied law and qualified as an advocate in 1811.

He inherited the Middlebie estate in Dumfriesshire from his grandmother Dorothea Clerk Maxwell upon her death in 1793; and assumed the additional surname of Maxwell. He built a new mansion designed by Walter Newall on his estate in Kirkcudbrightshire at Glenlair.

He was elected a Fellow of the Royal Society of Edinburgh in 1821, his proposer being Sir George Steuart Mackenzie.

In the 1830s he is recorded as living at 14 India Street in Edinburgh's Second New Town, which is where James Clerk Maxwell was born.

He died on 3 April 1856. He is buried in Parton in Kirkcudbrightshire.

== Family ==
He was the brother of Sir George Clerk of Penicuik, and brother-in-law of James Wedderburn.

He married Frances Hodshon Cay, daughter of Robert Hodshon Cay and Elizabeth Liddell. Their children included the mathematical physicist James Clerk Maxwell.

His brother-in-law was John Cay.
