= Charlton Hall, Northumberland =

Country house in Northumberland, England

Coordinates: 55.49488°N 1.71826°W

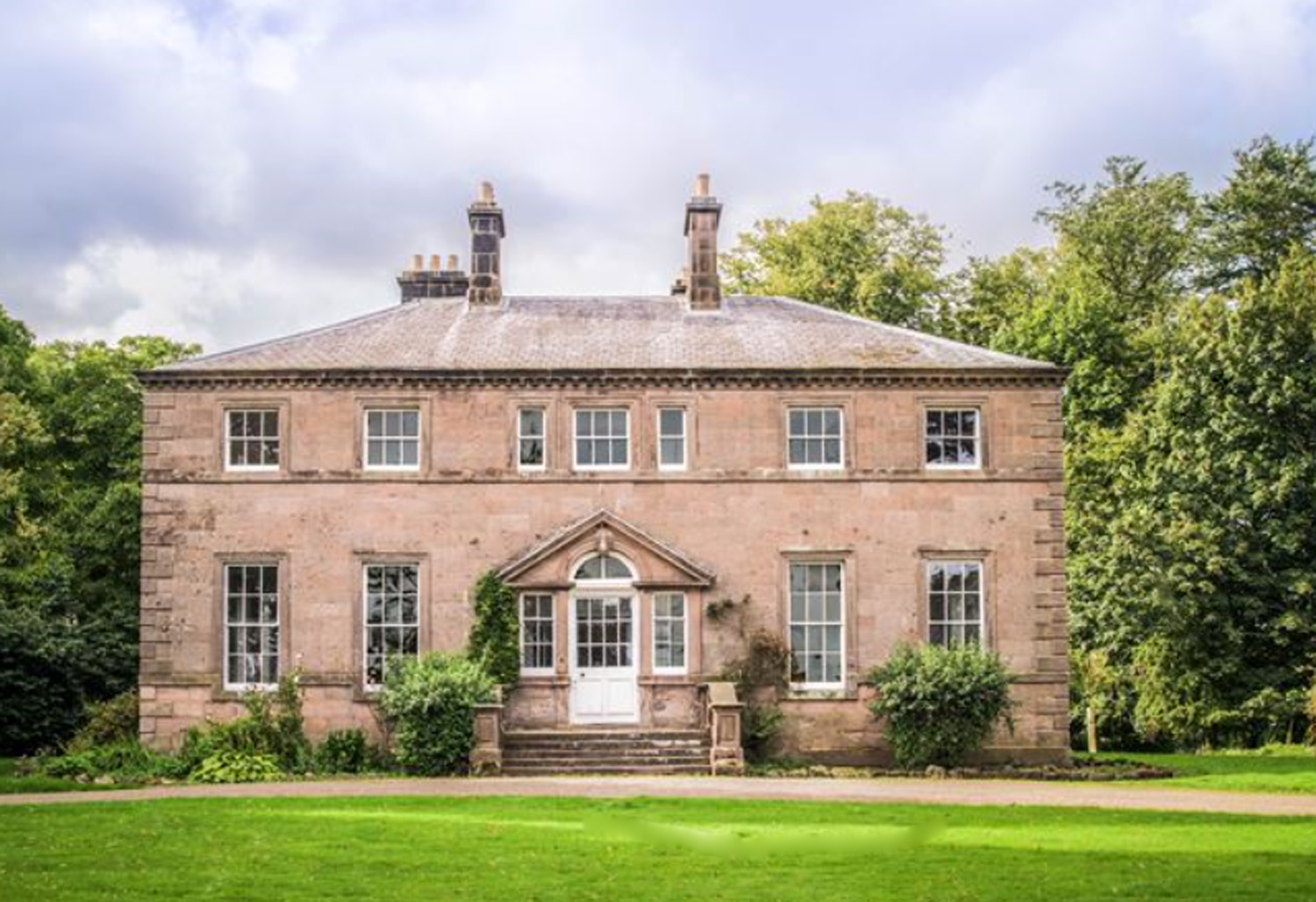
Charlton Hall

Charlton Hall near Ellingham, Northumberland, is a building of historical significance and is listed Grade II* on the English Heritage Register. It was built in the late 18th century by the notable architect William Newton for the Cay family. It was the residence of several prominent people over the next three centuries and is now a luxury wedding venue.

== The Cay family ==
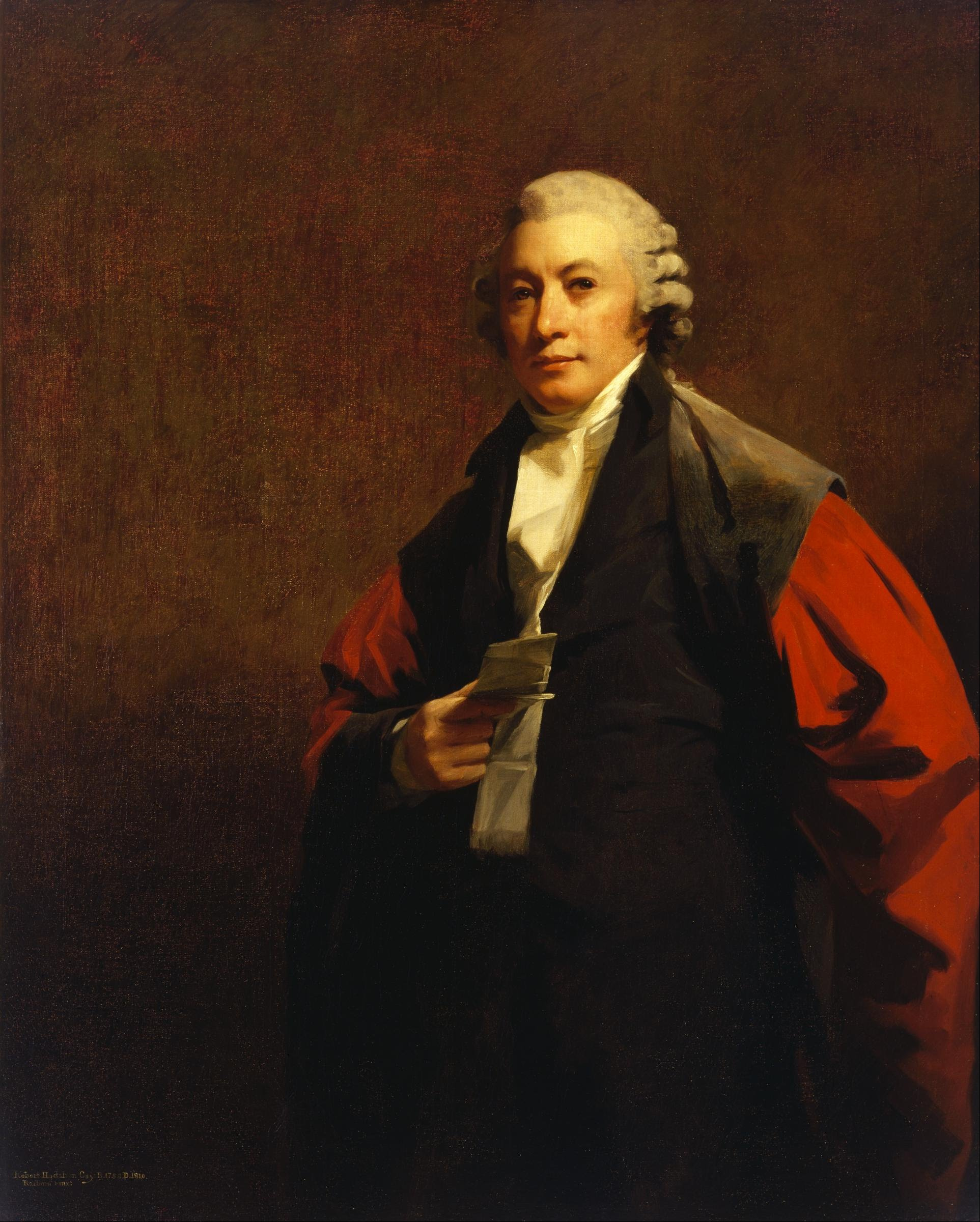
Robert Hodshon Cay, principal judge in the High Court of the Admiralty in Scotland

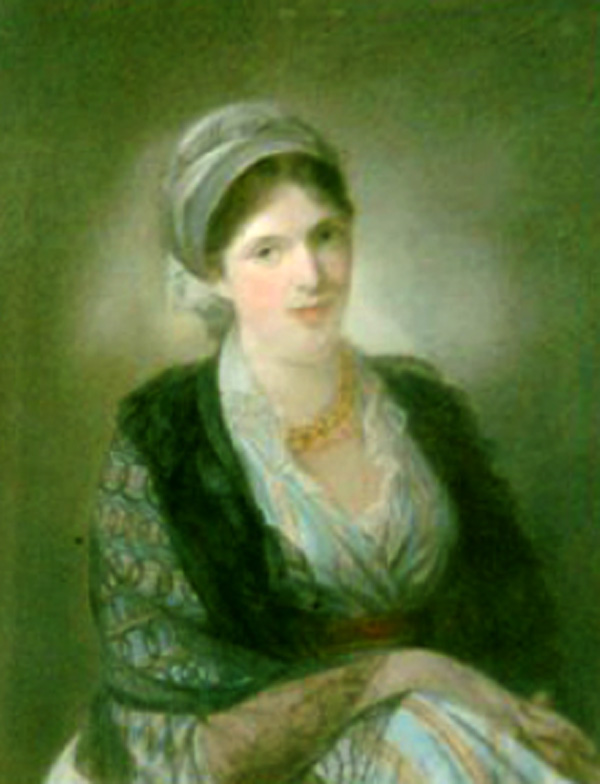
Elizabeth Cay (formerly Liddell)

Jabez Cay (1666–1703) bought the Charlton estate in 1696. It then passed through the Cay family until 1782 when it was inherited by Robert Hodshon Cay (1758–1810) who commissioned William Newton to build the new hall.

Robert was born in 1758. His father was John Cay (1727–1782) and his mother was Frances Hodshon, daughter of Ralph Hodshon of Lintz Hall, Durham. He was educated at Glasgow University and obtained a law degree. He later became Judge of the High Court of Admiralty in Scotland.

In 1789, shortly after he built Charlton Hall, he married Elizabeth Liddell (1770–1831), daughter of John Liddell of North Shields. She was an accomplished artist and her work is still discussed today. The couple had nine children, one being the mother of the famous physicist James Clerk Maxwell.

When Robert died in 1810 his eldest son John Cay (1790–1865) inherited Charlton Hall. John was a lawyer, an antiquarian and a pioneer photographer. In 1819 he married Emily Bullock, the daughter of William Bullock of Jamaica. The couple had seven children. In 1849 he decided to sell Charlton Hall and he placed an advertisement in the newspaper which described the house in the following terms.

"Charlton Hall is a pleasantly situated mansion house containing entrance hall, drawing room, dining room, breakfast room, library, housekeeper’s room, seven bed rooms, two water closets, kitchen, three servants bedrooms, cellars and other conveniences, a double coach house, four stalled stable and harness room".

== Later residents ==
William Spours (1800-1878), a lawyer and landowner, bought the property. He was born in 1800 in Alnwick and married Mary Shepherd. He died in 1878 and the house was again advertised for sale. It was purchased by the Reverend William Tudor Thorp.

Reverend William Tudor Thorp (1841-1919) was born in 1841 in Alnwick. His father was Thomas Thorp (1805-1854), an Attorney, and his mother was Elizabeth Jane Tudor. He was educated at the University of Oxford and obtained his BA. In 1863 he married Emily Sarah West (1839-1871) and the couple had three children. She died in 1871 and in 1875 he married Mary Louisa Jones (1850-1904), who was the daughter of Dr John Jones of Langstone Court. They had six children: five sons and one daughter. Their youngest son was Reginald Pearce Thorp (1884-1980), who was the father of the penultimate Thorp family owner of Charlton Hall, Reginald William Tudor Thorp. (1915-2003) MBE.

Charlton Hall was acquired by the entrepreneur Richard Shell in May 2017 and is now a luxury wedding venue. He also operates Doxford Barns wedding venue on the neighbouring Doxford Estate.
