= Maxwell's theorem (geometry) =

Given a triangle and a point, constructs a second triangle with a special point

Line segments with identical markings are parallel. If the sides of the triangle$A'B'C'$ are parallel to the according cevians of triangle $ABC$, which are intersecting in a common point $V'$, then the cevians of triangle $A'B'C'$, which are parallel to the according sides of triangle $ABC$ intersect in a common point $V'$ as well

Maxwell's theorem is the following statement about triangles in the plane.

For a given triangle $ABC$ and a point $V$ not on the sides of that triangle construct a second triangle $A'B'C'$, such that the side $A'B'$ is parallel to the line segment $CV$, the side $A'C'$ is parallel to the line segment $BV$ and the side $B'C'$ is parallel to the line segment $AV$. Then the parallel to $AB$ through $C'$, the parallel to $BC$ through $A'$ and the parallel to $AC$ through $B'$ intersect in a common point $V'$.

The theorem is named after the physicist James Clerk Maxwell (1831–1879), who proved it in his work on reciprocal figures, which are of importance in statics.
