= Elizabeth Liddell =

British artist (1770–1831)

- Self-Portrait, in blue striped dress with black lace shawl, pastel (James Clerk Maxwell Foundation)
- Born: 1770
- Died: 1831 (aged 60–61)
- Occupation: artist
- Spouse: Robert Hodshon Cay

Elizabeth Liddell, later Mrs. Robert Hodshon Cay, (22 February 1770 – 1831) was an amateur British artist specialising in pastel portraits. She was wife of Robert Hodshon Cay, mother of John Cay, mother-in-law of John Clerk-Maxwell of Middlebie and grandmother of James Clerk Maxwell.

== Life ==
Liddell was the daughter of John Liddell (1735–1802) of Dockwray Square in North Shields and Jane Hubback (1736–1805). Her father is thought to have been a ship-owner, probably establishing the naval link to her future husband. She married Robert Hodshon Cay, a noted Scottish judge, in 1789.

Liddell studied under the British artist Archibald Skirving and from him, she learned to paint pastels and portraits. She also had contact with Sir Henry Raeburn who is known to have painted both her husband Robert and her mother. William Bewick is also known to have painted her sister, Barbara. In 1797 she is recorded as having an adult baptism at the Charlotte Chapel in Rose Street, Edinburgh (near Charlotte Square) indicating conversion to the Baptist Church.

Following the death of her husband Robert in 1810, she continued to live in the family home (11 Heriot Row) until death. Her son John Cay shared the house until 1822, before moving to 5 South East Circus Place, slightly to the north. She died in Edinburgh on 27 October 1831. She is buried in Restalrig Churchyard, just north of the church.

== Works ==
While other works undoubtedly exist the only portraits of known named persons exist as a group at the James Clerk Maxwell Museum at 14 India Street in Edinburgh.

- Self-portrait
- John Cay (her son)
- Jane Cay (her daughter)
- Frances Cay (mother of James Clerk Maxwell)
- Robert Dundas Cay (her son)

Other more vague works include:

- Portrait of the blacksmith (bequeathed to her daughter Jane in her will)

Her box of art materials is held by the Victoria and Albert Museum in London. The box proves her pastel work was applied by cloth or brush rather than in stick form.

== Family ==
Liddell married Robert Hodshon Cay of North Charlton in Edinburgh in 1789. They had nine children, including:

- John Cay
- Frances Hodshon Cay (wife of John Clerk-Maxwell of Middlebie and mother of James Clerk Maxwell)
- Robert Dundas Cay (lawyer to James Clerk Maxwell)
