= North Charlton =

Hamlet in Northumberland, England

Coordinates: 55.496°N 1.74°W

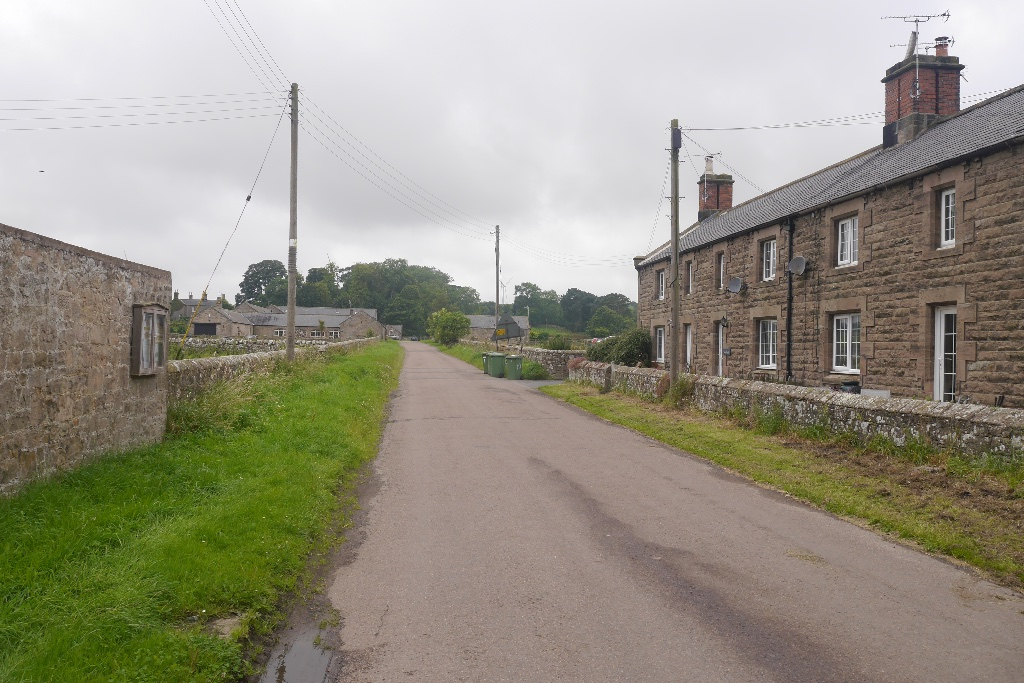

- Location within Northumberland
- OS grid reference: NU165225
- Civil parish: Eglingham
- Unitary authority: Northumberland
- Ceremonial county: Northumberland
- Region: North East
- Country: England
- Sovereign state: United Kingdom
- Post town: CHATHILL
- Postcode district: NE67
- Dialling code: 01665
- Police: Northumbria
- Fire: Northumberland
- Ambulance: North East
- UK Parliament: North Northumberland

North Charlton is a hamlet in the civil parish of Eglingham, in Northumberland, England. It is situated between Alnwick and Berwick-upon-Tweed, on the A1. A notable country house is Charlton Hall which is now a wedding venue. There are 25 properties within the hamlet itself. A medieval market cross still stands in the hamlet immediately after the first row of farm cottages to the right. This is a Grade II listed monument.

The farm cottages, to the right of the main road into North Charlton, were erected in 1868 and were built by the Baker-Cresswell family to house local farm workers. The east facing cottages were adjacent to the former A1 before the trunk road was moved slightly east in 1993. The old A1 is now a short road link between North Charlton and nearby Brownieside, which itself has an exit onto the A1. The hamlet was also home to a coaching inn on the A1 called The Spread Eagle which is now three separate cottages.

The westbound road through North Charlton is one of the most remote public roads in Northumberland, which finally ends at a T junction almost adjacent to Chillingham Castle.

== Governance ==
North Charlton is in the parliamentary constituency of North Northumberland. North Charlton was formerly a township in the parish of Ellingham, in 1866 North Charlton became a civil parish, on 1 April 1955 the parish was abolished and merged with Eglingham. In 1951 the civil parish had a population of 90.
