= Robert Hodshon Cay =

Scottish judge (1758–1810)

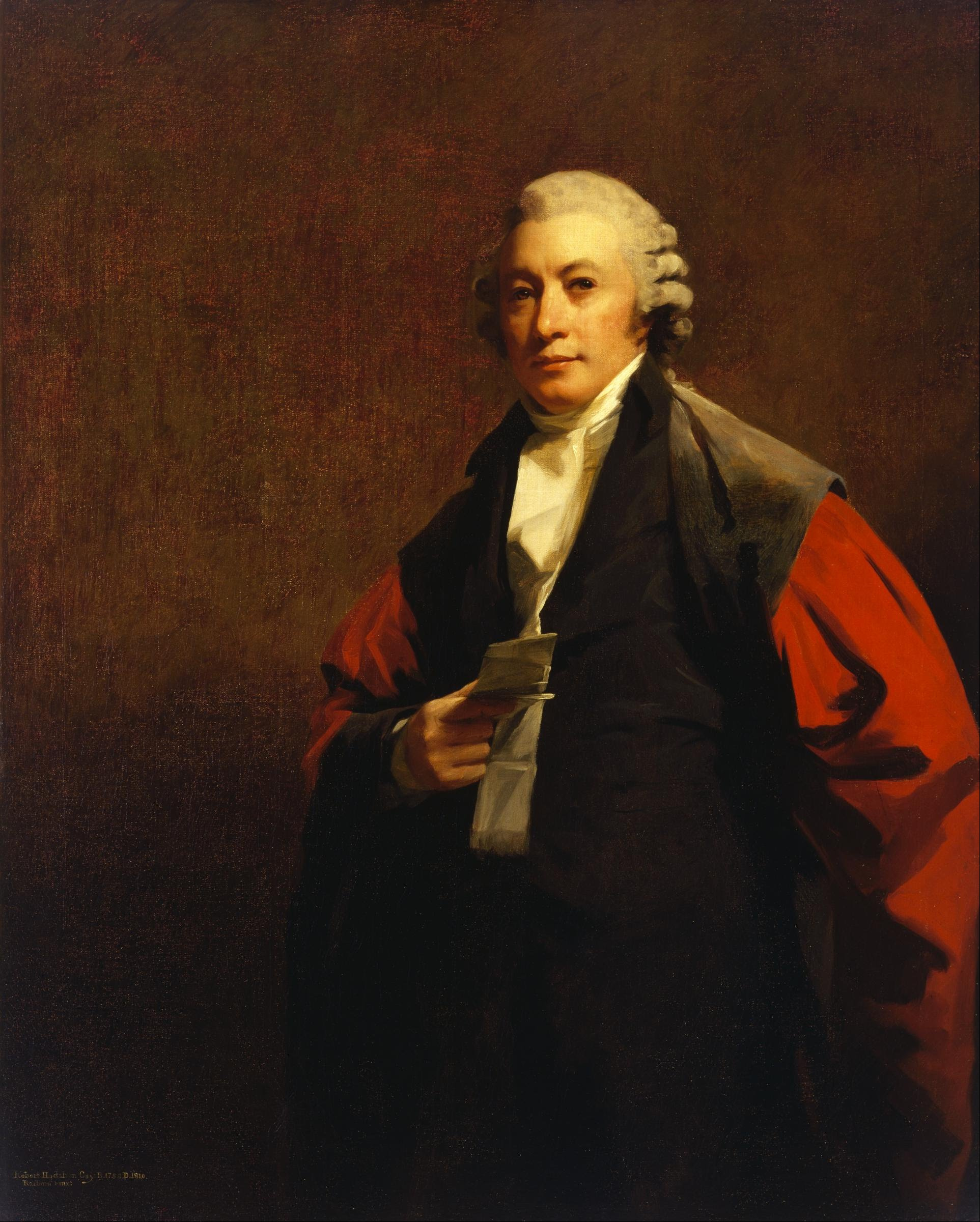
Robert Hodshon Cay by Sir Henry Raeburn

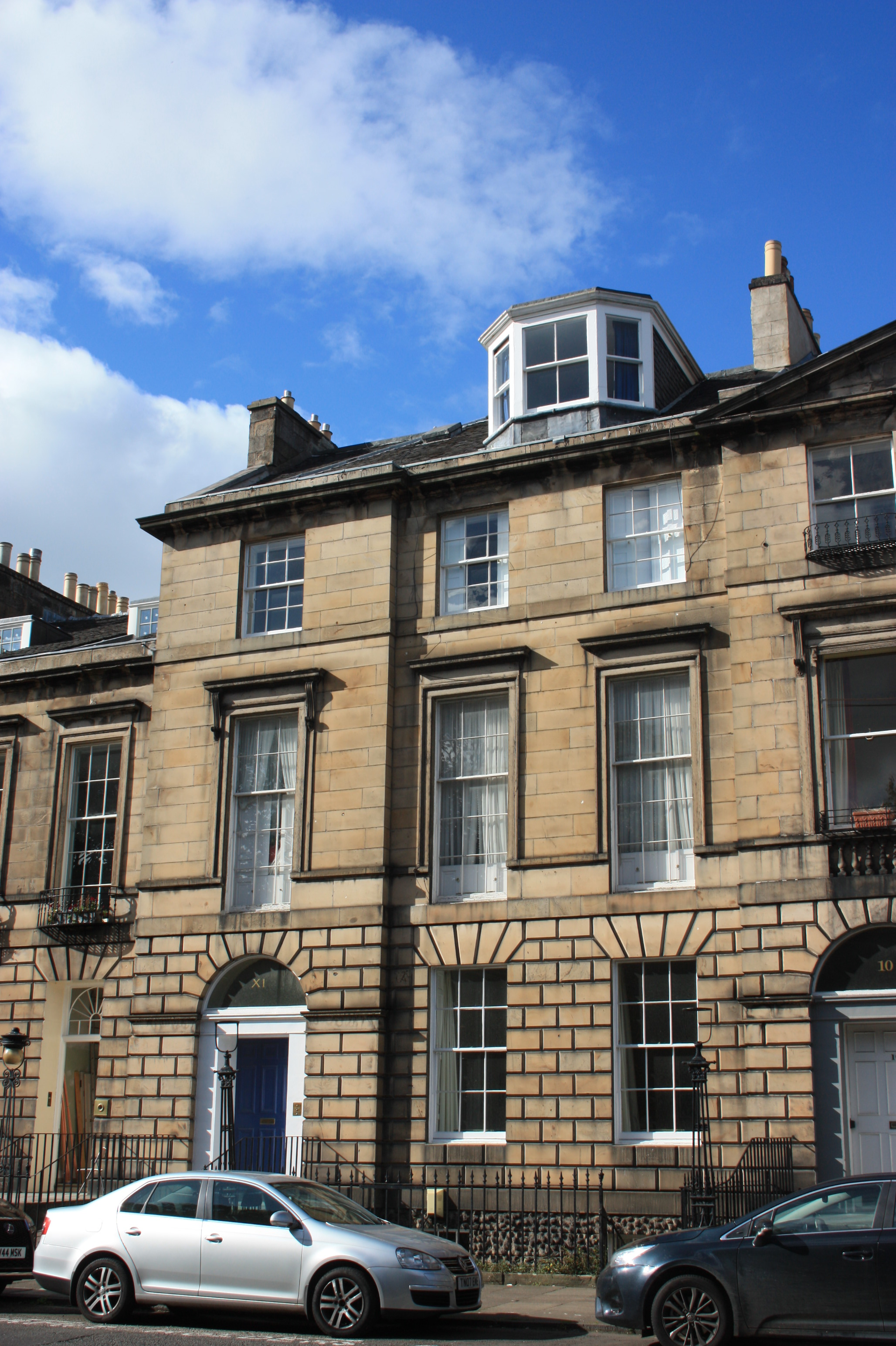
11 Heriot Row

Robert Hodshon Cay FSSA LLD (7 July 1758 – 31 March 1810) was Judge Admiral of Scotland overseeing naval trials. He was husband of the artist Elizabeth Liddell, father of John Cay FRSE and maternal grandfather of James Clerk Maxwell.

== Life ==
Cay was born on 7 July 1758 at Charlton Hall in North Charlton in Northumberland, the son of Frances Hodshon of Lintz (1730-1804) and John Cay DL JP.

In 1776 he is recorded as winning a gold medal for horsemanship at the Edinburgh Riding School.

He studied law at the University of Glasgow graduating in 1778, and was admitted to the Scottish Bar in 1780. By 1800 he had risen to be the principal judge in the High Court of the Admiralty in Scotland (usually termed Judge Admiral). In 1788 he was also created a Commissary of Edinburgh.

In 1793 he moved to 1 George Street, occupying the upper two levels of a large Georgian tenement on the corner of St Andrew Square in Edinburgh's New Town. The house is now demolished. He was a Trustee of Charlotte Chapel on Rose Street and can be presumed to have worshipped there. He is known to have been a friend of Rev Daniel Sandford who oversaw worship at the chapel. He was a member of the Scottish Society of Antiquaries.

The University of Edinburgh awarded him an honorary doctorate (LLD) in 1803. In this year he moved to 11 Heriot Row, which was then a new house).

He died at home, 11 Heriot Row in Edinburgh on 31 March 1810. He is buried in Restalrig Churchyard in eastern Edinburgh. The grave lies just north of the church, with his father.

His principal estate remainder Charlton Hall in Northumberland which he had inherited from his father.

== Artistic recognition ==
Cay was painted by Sir Henry Raeburn. This portrait is now with the Museum of Fine Arts in Houston, Texas. A copy of this by Isabella Cay (1850-1934) (his granddaughter) hangs in the James Clerk Maxwell Foundation museum.

== Family ==
On 26 September 1789 he married amateur pastellist Elizabeth Liddell, daughter of John Liddell of Tynemouth. Their children were:

- John Cay
- Frances Hodshon Cay (mother of James Clerk Maxwell)
- Jane Cay
- Robert Dundas Cay (James Clerk Maxwell's lawyer)
- Albert Cay
- Robert (died young)
- Elizabeth (died young)
- George (died at 6 weeks) buried in Restalrig
