= Ellingham, Northumberland =

Civil parish in Northumberland, England

Coordinates: 55.5229°N 1.7243°W

Ellingham
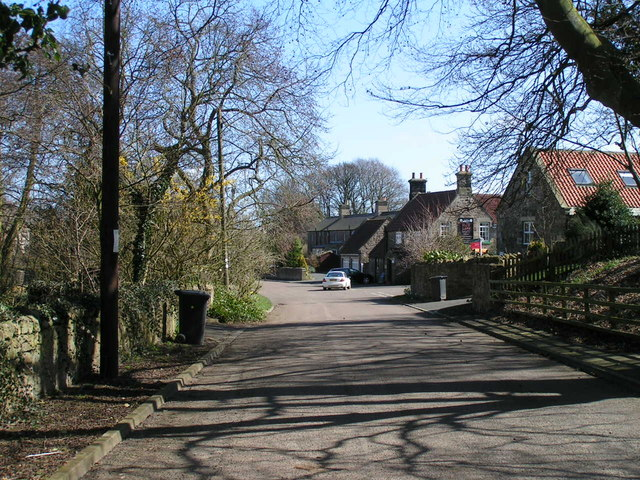

- Location within Northumberland
- Population: 282 (2001 census)
- OS grid reference: NU175255
- Unitary authority: Northumberland
- Ceremonial county: Northumberland
- Region: North East
- Country: England
- Sovereign state: United Kingdom
- Post town: CHATHILL
- Postcode district: NE67
- Dialling code: 01665
- Police: Northumbria
- Fire: Northumberland
- Ambulance: North East
- UK Parliament: North Northumberland

Ellingham is a civil parish in Northumberland, England. The population taken at the 2001 Census was 282, increasing slightly to 288 at the 2011 Census.
