= John Cay =

Scottish advocate, pioneer photographer and antiquarian

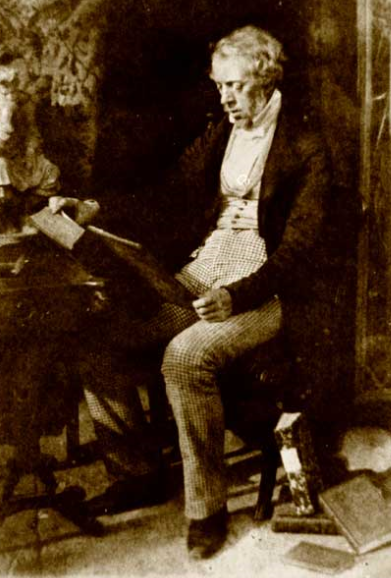
Early calotype of John Cay by Hill & Adamson c. 1850

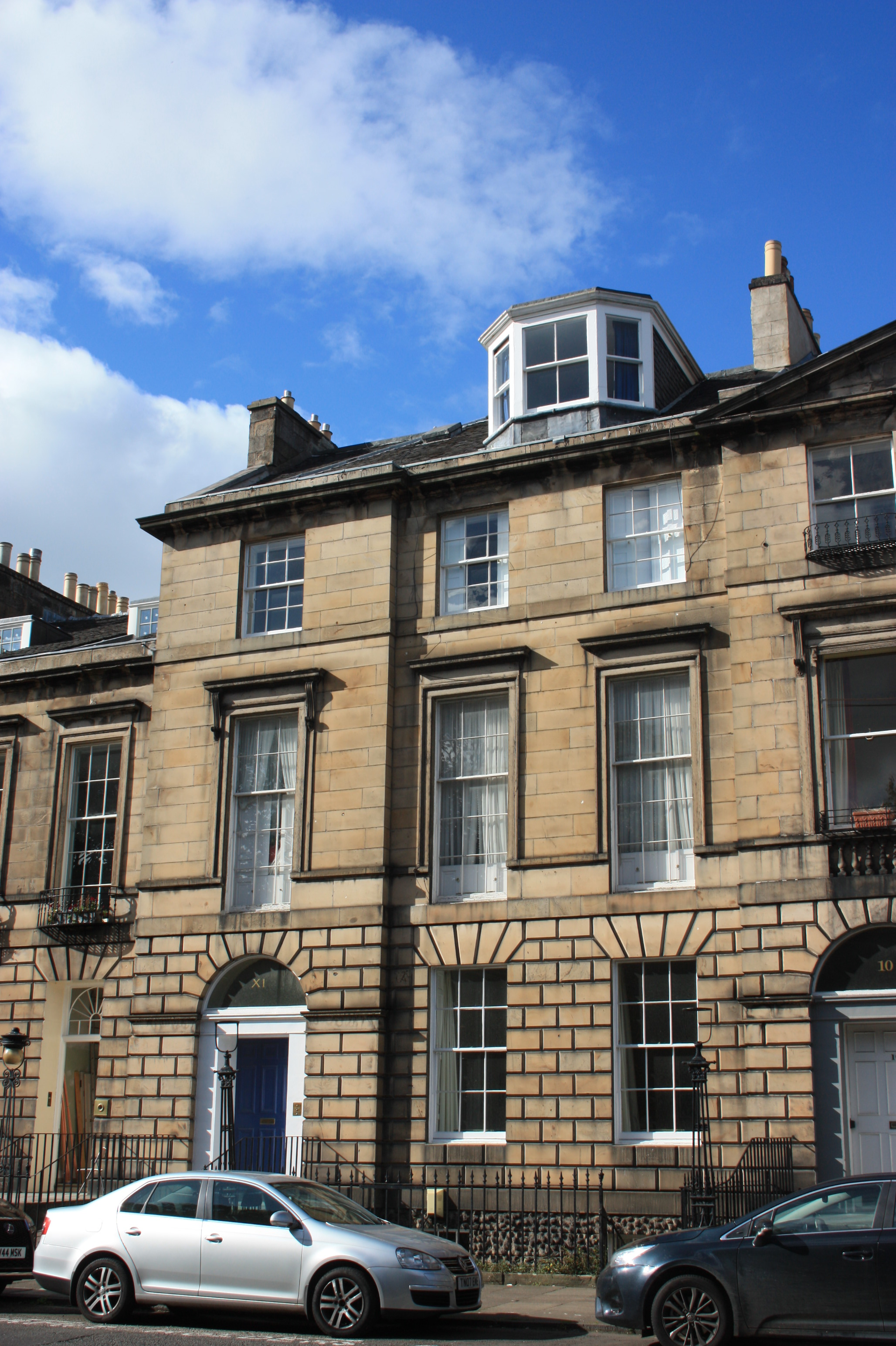
11 Heriot Row, Edinburgh

John Lidell Cay FRSE PRSSA (31 August 1790 – 13 December 1865) was a Scottish advocate, pioneer photographer and antiquarian. He served as the Sheriff of Linlithgowshire 1822–65. He was the maternal uncle of James Clerk Maxwell.

He was an original member of the Edinburgh Calotype Club, one of the world's first photographic clubs (1843), and a keen early photographer alongside his friend Sir David Brewster and the Edinburgh pioneers David Octavius Hill and Robert Adamson. He made very early photographic presentations to the Royal Scottish Society of Arts.

== Life ==
He was born in the family home on George Street in Edinburgh on 31 August 1790, the son of Robert Hodshon Cay LLD (1758–1810) of North Charlton who was Judge Admiral of Scotland, and his wife Elizabeth Liddell (1770–1831) a relatively famous pastellist, and pupil of Archibald Skirving. He was educated at the High School in Edinburgh then studied law at the University of Edinburgh. He was admitted to the Scottish Bar as an advocate in 1812.

Cay was elected a Fellow of the Royal Society of Edinburgh in 1821, his proposer being Sir William Arbuthnot. At this time he lived (with his mother) in a large and opulent Georgian townhouse, 11 Heriot Row in the Second New Town of Edinburgh. He was a close neighbour to George Ballingall.

Cay served as president of the Royal Scottish Society of Arts 1848–49.

He died at 5 South East Circus Place (where he had moved around 1825) in Edinburgh on 13 December 1865.

== Family ==
Cay had six sons, two of whom, Robert Cay (1822–1888) and Edward Cay (1825–1874), emigrated to Australia in the 1840s, becoming sheep-farmers. He had four daughters, one whom, Frances, died whilst an infant and is buried in Restalrig.

He was uncle to James Clerk Maxwell.

== Artistic recognition ==
A pastel portrait of Cay by his mother is held by the James Clerk Maxwell Museum.
