= Herapath =

Herapath is a surname. Notable people with the surname include:

- John Herapath (1790–1868), English physicist
- William Herapath (1796—1868) English chemist
- William Bird Herapath (1820–1868), British surgeon/chemist who patented Herapathite
- Herapath's Journal, a 19th-century British railway journal edited by John Herapath
