= William Herapath =

William Herapath may refer to:

- William Bird Herapath (1820–1868), English surgeon and chemist
- William Herapath (chemist) (1796–1868), English analytical chemist and political reformer
