= Calotype Club =

Calotype Club may refer to:

- Edinburgh Calotype Club, the first photographic club in the world.
- Calotype Society of London
