= Hugh Lyon Tennent =

Scottish advocate and photographer (1817–1874)

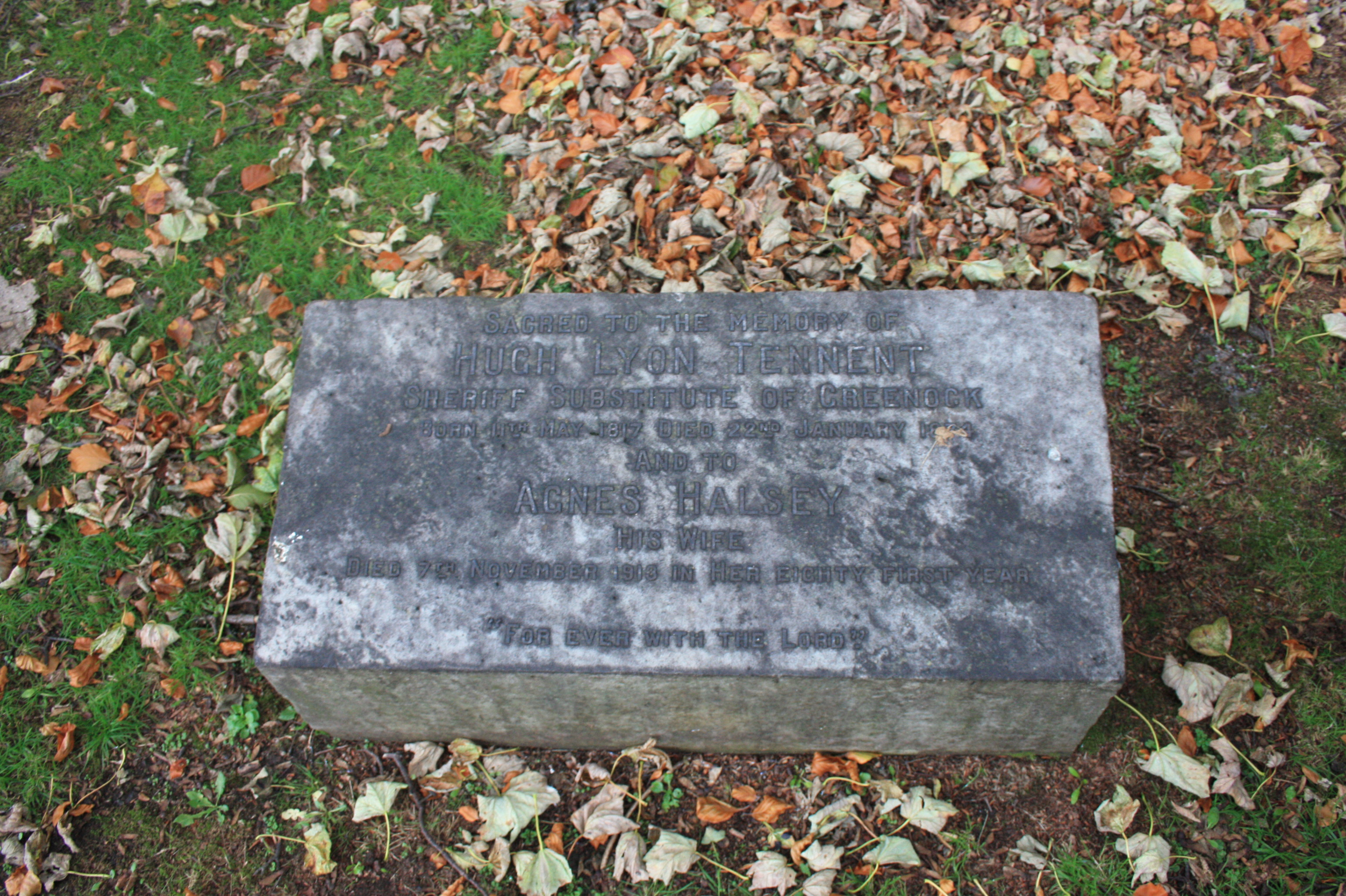
Tennent's grave, Dean Cemetery, Edinburgh

Hugh Lyon Tennent (11 May 1817 – 22 January 1874) was a Scottish advocate and pioneer photographer. He is sometimes recorded as Hugh Lyon Tennant.

== Life ==
Tennent was born in Edinburgh on 11 May 1817, the son of Margaret Rodger Lyon and Patrick Tennant (1782–1872). His older brother was the photographer Robert Tennent.

He studied law, qualifying as an advocate in 1840. He became Sheriff Substitute of Lanarkshire in 1853 and Sheriff Substitute of Greenock in 1856, remaining there for the rest of his life.

From 1843 he was a member of the Edinburgh Calotype Club along with his brother and other noted members such as David Brewster and John Cay. Tennent was one of the youngest members. He also joined the Photographic Society of Scotland in 1856. He took many early photographs of the Tennents Wellpark Brewery.

Tennent was a member of the Royal Clyde Yacht Club, and in later life he had a 15-ton yacht named "Seaward".

He promoted the Discharged Prisoners Aid Society.

He died in Edinburgh on 22 January 1874. He is buried in Dean Cemetery in western Edinburgh.

== Family ==
In 1855 he was married to Agnes Halsey (1833–1913). They had nine children including Henry Edward Tennent (1861-1873) who is buried with them.
