= John Herapath =

English physicist (1790–1868)

John Herapath (30 May 1790 – 24 February 1868) was an English physicist who gave a partial account of the kinetic theory of gases in 1820 though it was neglected by the scientific community at the time. He was the cousin of William Herapath, the chemist and William Bird Herapath, the physician who discovered herapathite. In 1847 he published an early textbook on mathematical physics.

== Background ==
Herapath's scientific interests started with an attempt to provide a mechanistic explanation for gravity. Motivated by his search for a mechanical explanation of gravitation, he started to consider how a system of colliding particles could give rise to action at a distance. In considering the effect of the high temperatures near the Sun on his gravific particles he was led to a relationship between temperature and particle velocity.

== Kinetic theory ==
Herapath postulated that the momentum of a particle in a gas is a measure of the absolute temperature of the gas. He used momentum, rather than the kinetic energy on which the later established theory is based, as it seemed to him to avoid some difficulties around whether elastic collisions were possible between indivisible atoms.

Apparently ignorant of Daniel Bernoulli's work, he was led to the incorrect, but suggestive, relationship that expresses the product of pressure P and volume V as proportional to the square of his true temperature. The correct relationship is proportional to the absolute temperature, not its square, the error arising from his identification of momentum, rather than energy, with temperature.

- Herapath, J. (1816), "On the physical properties of gases", Annals of Philosophy, Robert Baldwin: 56–60
- Brush, S. G. (1957), "The Development of the Kinetic Theory of Gases 1. Herapath.", Annals of Science, Taylor & Francis: 188–198

He submitted his ideas in a paper to the Royal Society in 1820 where it was peer reviewed by Sir Humphry Davy. Davy had already sympathised with the view that heat was associated with molecular motion rather than with Joseph Black's caloric theory of heat but he rejected Herapath's paper with some coolness, uncomfortable with the implication that there was an absolute zero of temperature at which all motion ceased. Davy may also have had some distaste for the mechanistic Newtonian picture, influenced as he was by the more holistic philosophy of the Romantic movement.

In 1821, Herapath used the assumption that the aether is heated by the bodies and loses density so that other bodies are pushed to these regions of lower density. However, it was shown by Taylor that the decreased density due to thermal expansion is compensated for by the increased speed of the heated particles; therefore, no attraction arises.

James Prescott Joule presented a short account of the work in 1848. Meanwhile, Herapath maintained a campaign against Davy and the Royal Society in the correspondence pages of The Times newspaper.

== Great Comet of 1831 ==
On 7 January 1831, Herapath was on Hounslow Heath when he sighted a comet. Due to its brilliance, it is one of the great comets. The comet was also observed by Thomas Glanville Taylor at the Madras Observatory.

== Railway Journal ==
In 1835 Herapath became editor of The Railway Magazine, which underwent four changes of name during the boom years of railways to become Herapath's Railway Journal in January 1894. It is now published as Railway Gazette International, and is not to be confused with The Railway Magazine which commenced publication in 1897. This gave him some limited opportunity to publish his scientific ideas. In 1836, he published a calculation of the mean molecular speed in a gas based on his kinetic theory and hence the speed of sound. Joule reproduced his results but is usually incorrectly credited as the originator.

The name changes were –

- Railway magazine May 1835-Feb. 1836
- Railway magazine and annals of science Mar. 1836 – Aug. 1839
- Railway magazine and steam navigation journal Mar. – Aug. 1839
- Railway magazine and commercial journal 17 Aug. 1839 – Dec. 1840
- Herapath's railway magazine, commercial journal, and scientific review Jan. 1841 – Dec. 1842
- Herapath's railway and commercial journal Jan. 1843 – Dec. 1845

The editions from 1839 to 1895 can be viewed in the National Archives and several issues are also available as e-books, e.g. 1837, 1836–1839 and several in Google books.

== Later work ==
He revised his theories in the 1840s, largely based on the experimental work of Thomas Graham and Henri Victor Regnault.

- 1847: Mathematical Physics; or, the Mathematical Principles of Natural Philosophy, the causes of heat, gaseous elasticity, gravitation, and other great phenomena of nature, Whittaker and company via HathiTrust

Herapath died at Catford Bridge, Lewisham on 24 February 1868 and was buried at West Norwood Cemetery.

== See also ==
- History of thermodynamics
- List of railroad-related periodicals
- John James Waterston
