= Robert Tennent =

Robert Tennent may refer to:

- Robert Tennent (photographer) (1815–1890), Scottish photographer and landowner in Australia
- Robert Tennent (physician) (1765–1837), Irish physician, merchant and philanthropist in Belfast
- Robert James Tennent (1803–1880), his son, Irish politician
