= James Macphail =

Scottish minister and photographer

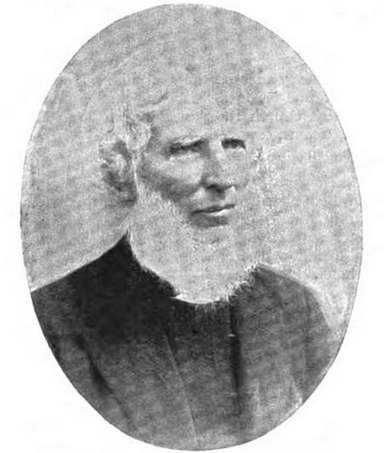
James Calder Macphail

James Calder Macphail (21 February 1821 – 12 February 1908) was a Scottish Free Church minister and Gaelic tutor. He is best remembered as a pioneer photographer and one of the first to photograph the Holy Land.

== Life ==
He was born on 21 February 1821 near Loch Broom in Wester Ross in northern Scotland.

In 1847/8 he travelled to Italy and Malta. Four photographs from this trip still exist. He was a friend to James Dunlop (1830-1858) and his uncle Alexander Earle Monteith. His friend Cosmo Innes encouraged him to take an interest in photography and he joined the Edinburgh Calotype Club in 1843 aged only 22.

He studied divinity at the University of Aberdeen, Divinity College and New College, Edinburgh. After being licensed by the Church of Scotland he served as assistant minister at Enzie.

He was ordained in the Free Church of Scotland in 1849, and his first charge was the East Free Church in Aberdeen. In 1868 he moved to the newly completed Pilrig Church on Leith Walk designed by Peddie & Kinnear. He replaced Rev William Garden Blaikie who oversaw the building of the new church, replacing an earlier structure by David Cousin on the opposite side of Pilrig Street. He would have then lived in the associated manse, at the north end of Pilrig Street facing the grounds of Pilrig House (later becoming Pilrig Park).

In 1869 he founded a bursary to Gaelic-speaking boys to fund their university education for the Free Church of Scotland.

In the 1870s he made a photographic tour of the Holy Land. He was a member of the Edinburgh Calotype Club.

Macphail remained minister of Pilrig Church until at least 1895, continuing to live at Pilrig manse. By this stage the University of Edinburgh granted him an honorary doctorate (DD). He left Edinburgh on retiral around 1896.

He died on 12 February 1908 and is buried in the first northern extension of Dean Cemetery in western Edinburgh. The grave lies in the first northern extension facing south onto the south path.

== Family ==
He was married to Ann Badenach Nicolson (1834-1918) daughter of Robert Badenoch and Ann Wilson (a wealthy landowner).

They had two daughters, Annie Catherine Phebe Macphail and Sybella Mary Macphail.

His elder son James Robert Nicolson Macphail (1858-1933) was an antiquary, while his younger son Earle Monteith Macphail (1861-1937) was a missionary to India who became principal (1921) and vice-chancellor (1923-5) of Madras University and rose to a senior position in colonial politics, rising to become deputy chairman of the Legislative Assembly of India in 1927.

== Publications ==
- Old Stones for a New Church (1877)

== Gallery ==
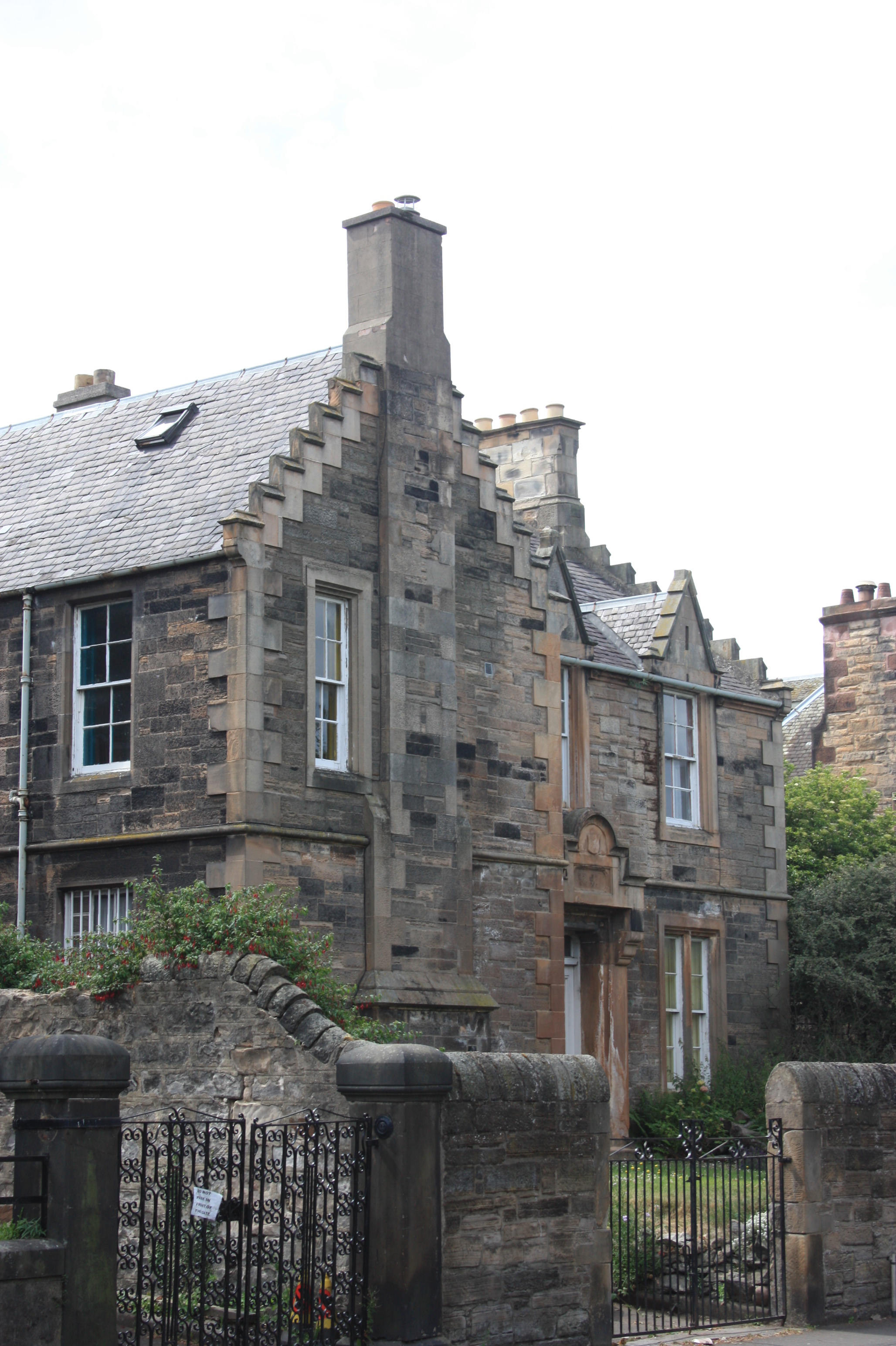
Pilrig manse, Edinburgh

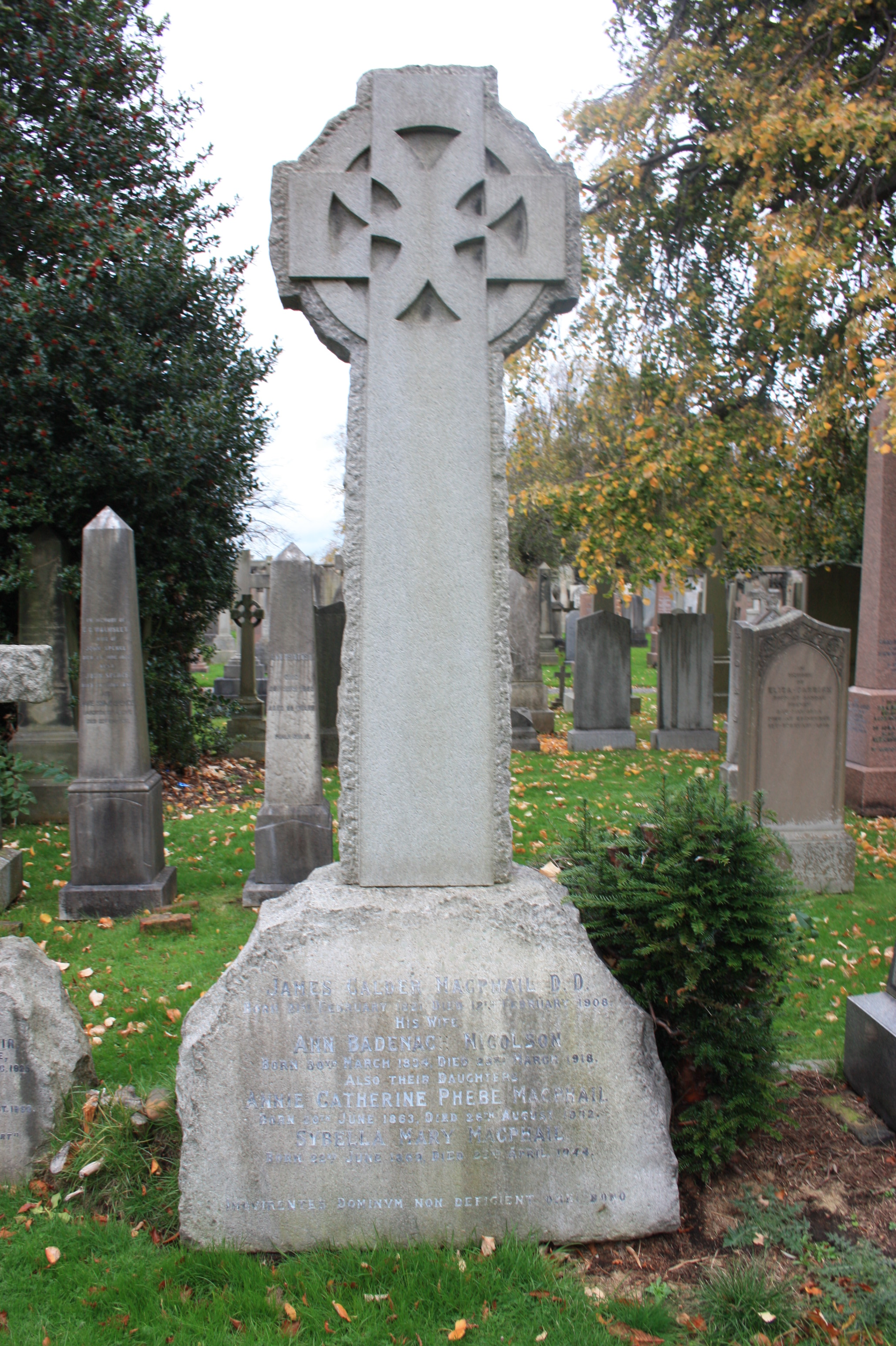
The grave of Rev Dr James Calder Macphail, Dean Cemetery, Edinburgh

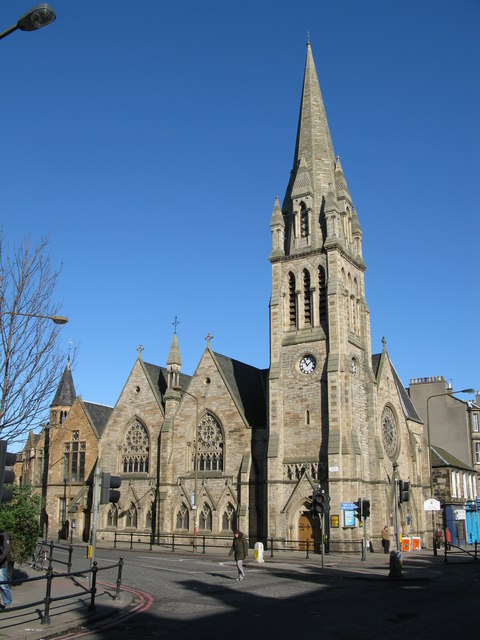
Pilrig St. Paul's Church
