= Pilrig =

Suburb of Edinburgh, Scotland

Coordinates: 55°57′53.14″N 3°10′45.91″W

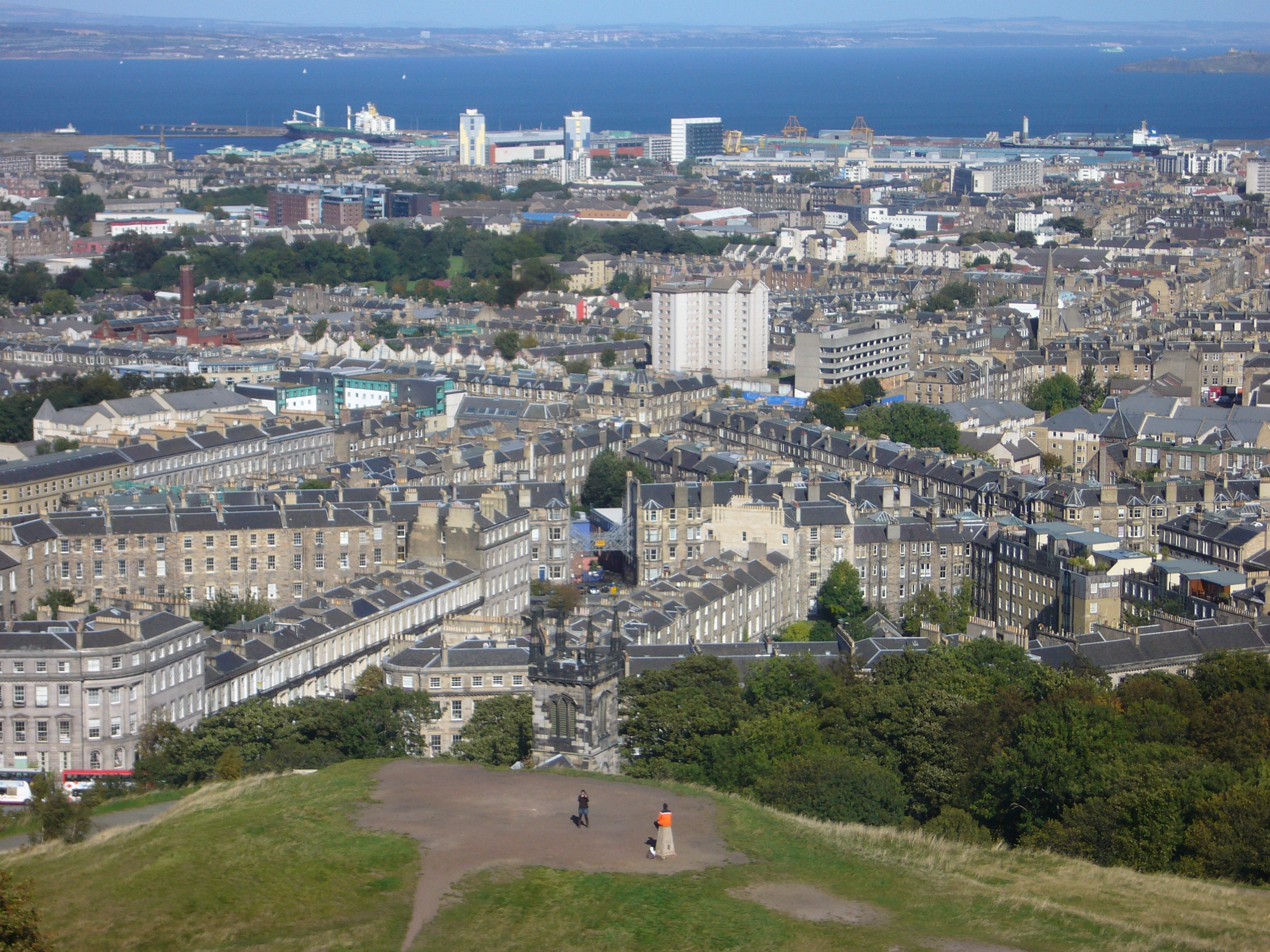
The Pilrig area from the Calton Hill

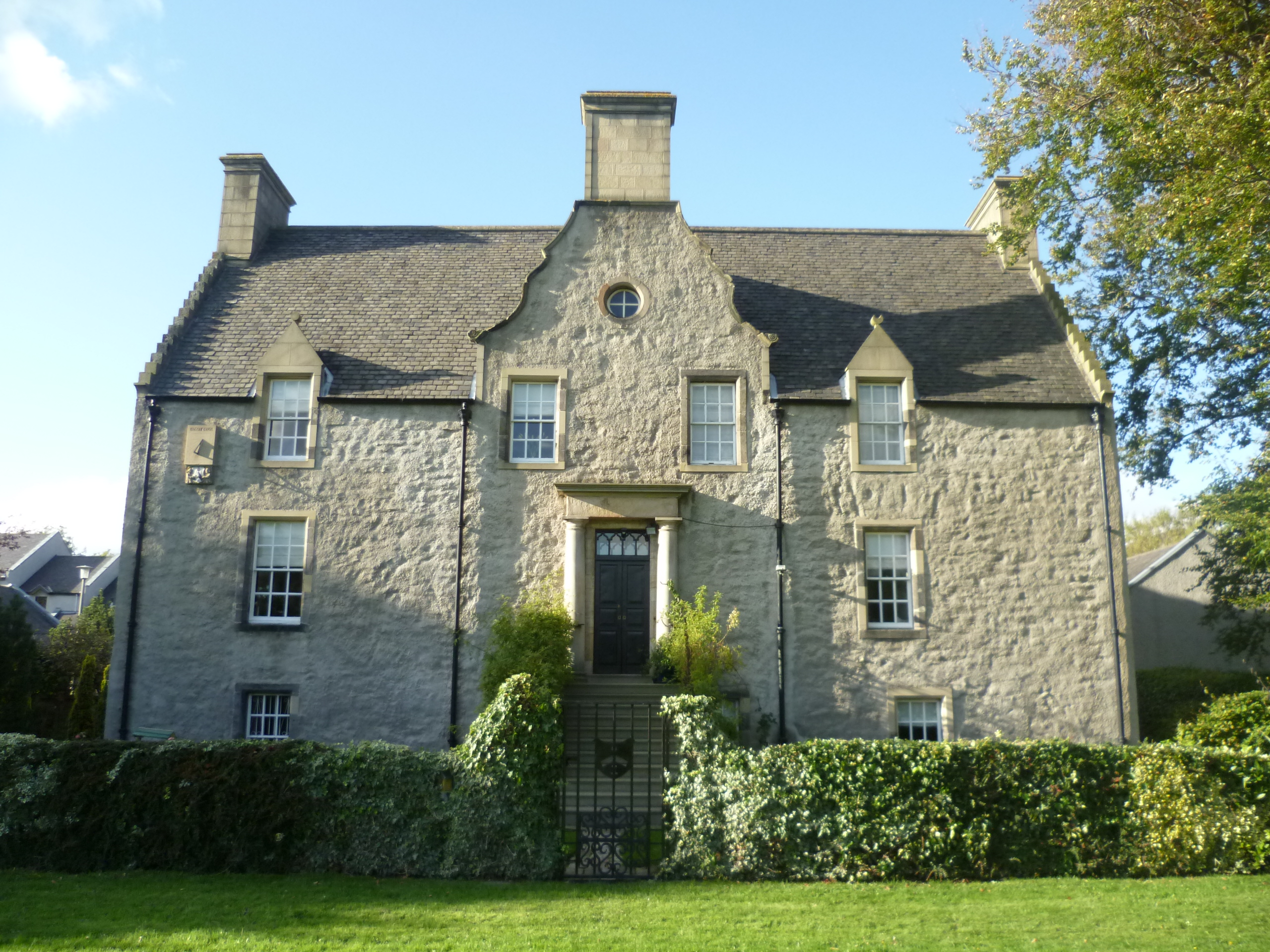
Pilrig House

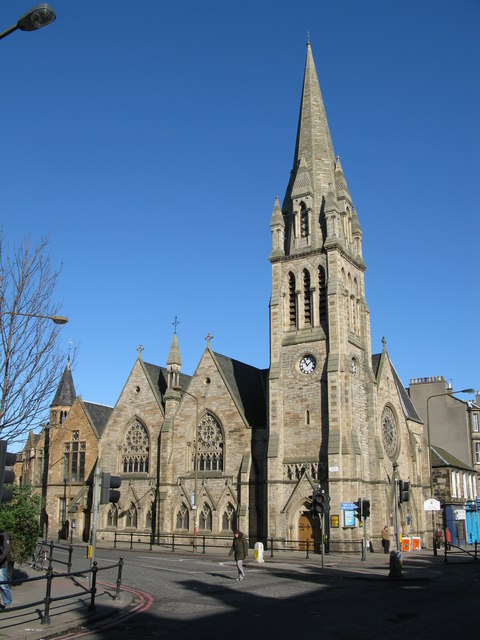
Pilrig Church

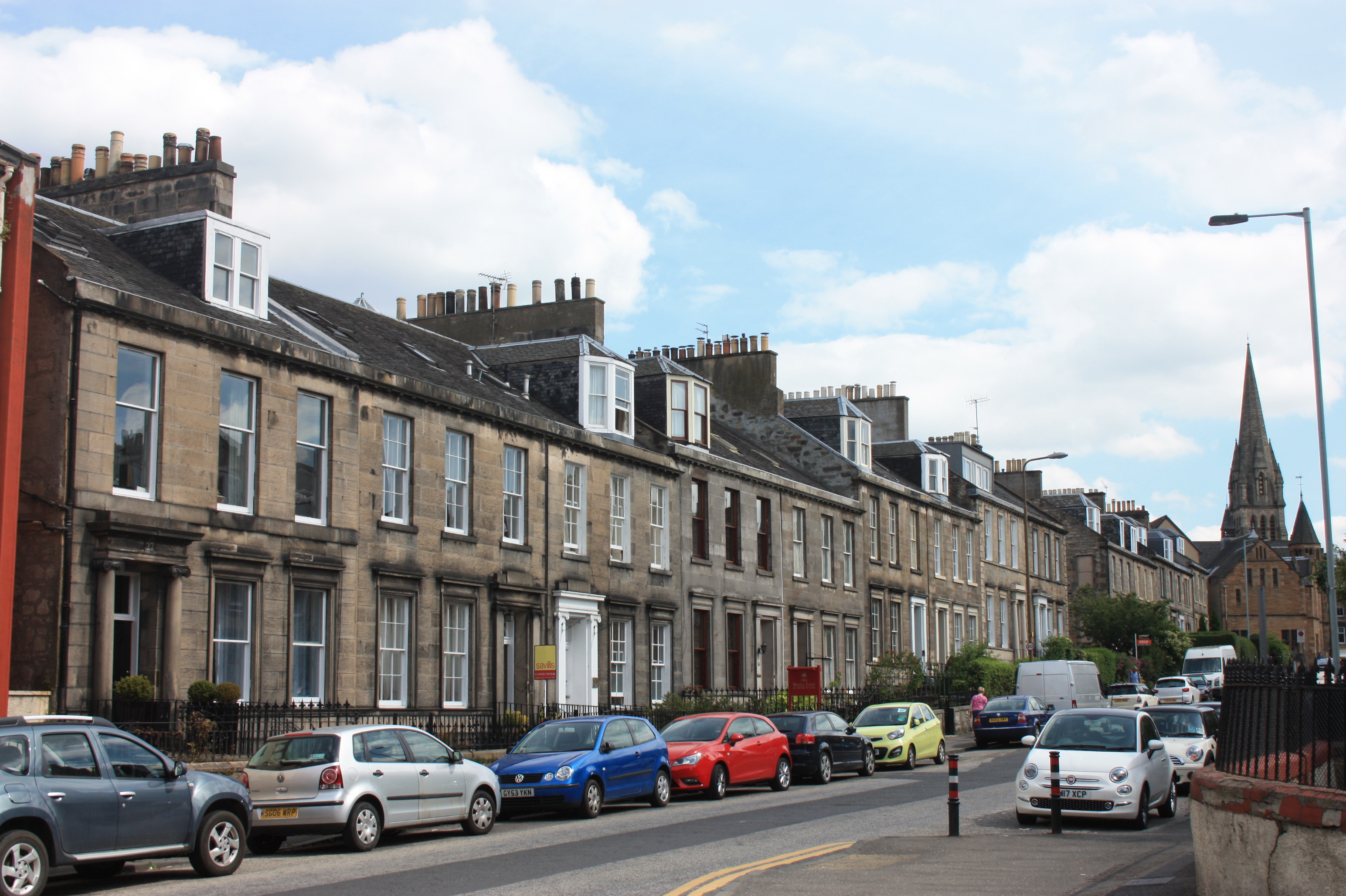
Georgian houses on Pilrig Street

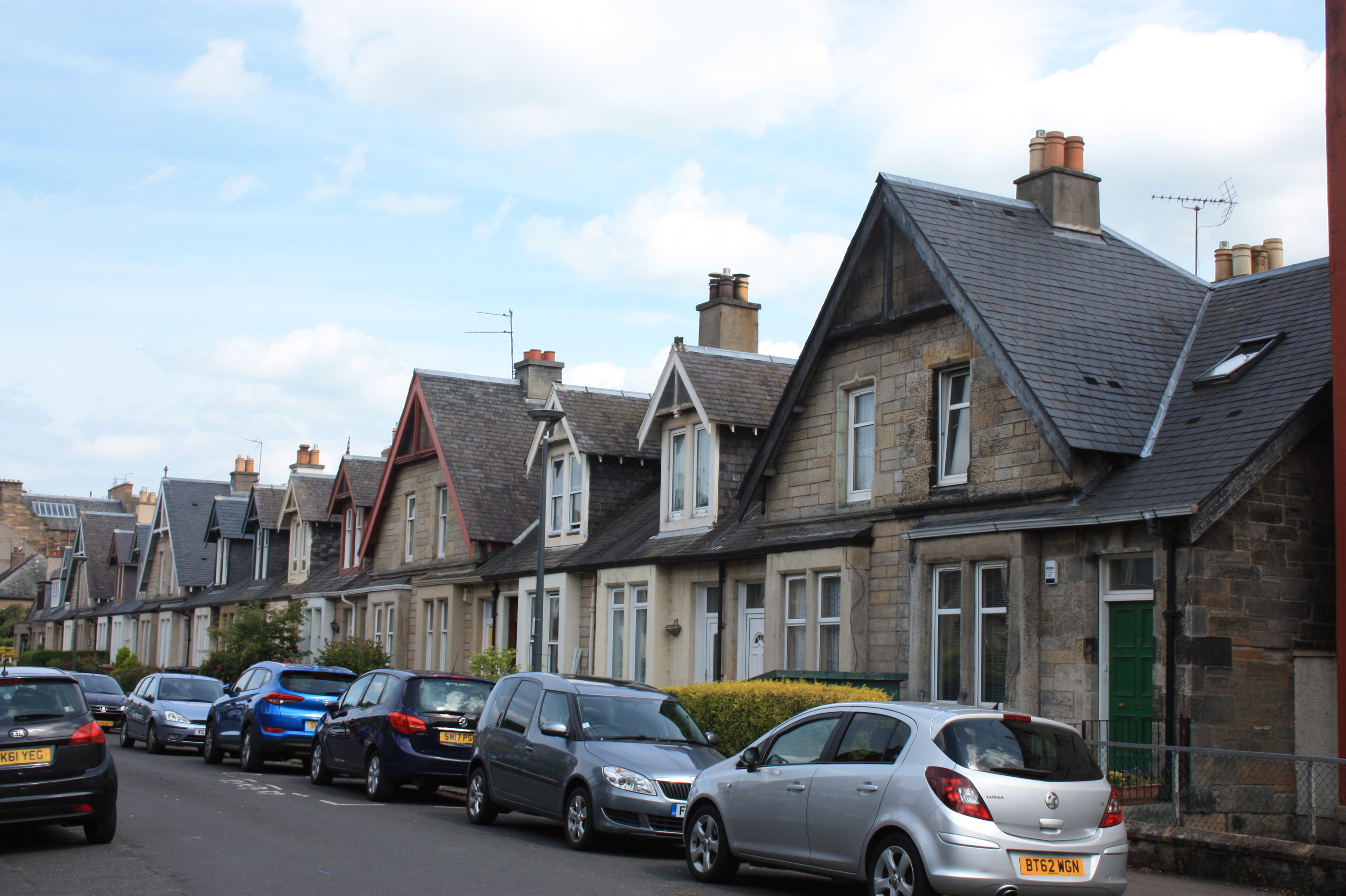
Cambridge Avenue, Edinburgh

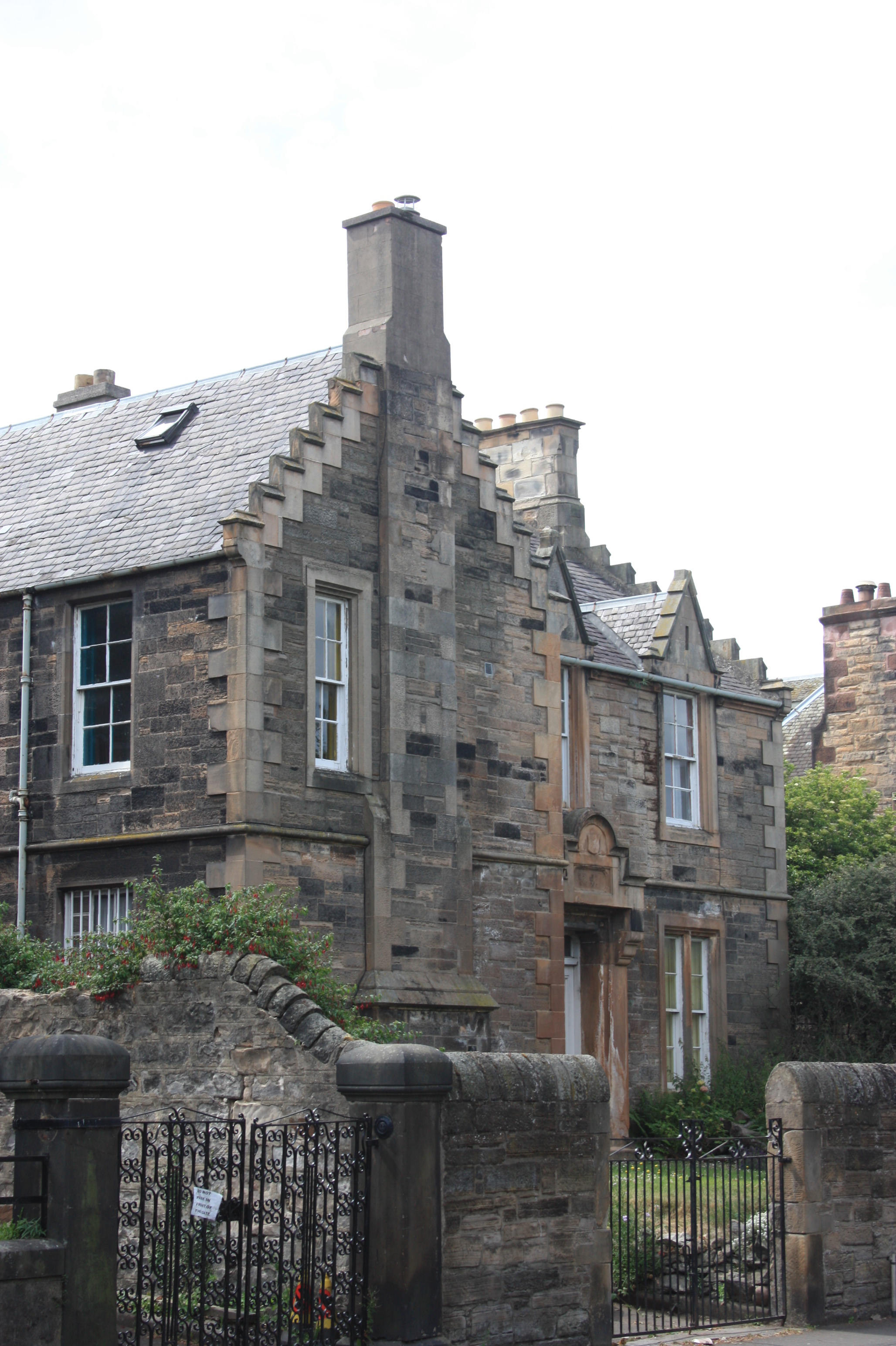
Pilrig manse, Edinburgh

Pilrig is an area of Edinburgh, the capital of Scotland. The name probably derives from the long field (rig) on which a peel tower (pil/peel) stood. There is evidence of a peel tower situated on an area of higher ground above the Water of Leith.

Pilrig lies midway between Leith and Edinburgh, west of Leith Walk.

It is split by Pilrig Street, which marks the division between the EH6 and EH7 postcode districts (also the old division between Edinburgh and Leith hence the name of the bar on Leith Walk opposite - the Boundary Bar).

Along the north-east side of Pilrig Street lies Pilrig Park, within which is Pilrig House, the heart of the former estate of the Balfour family.

The 19th-century Rosebank Cemetery is located at the west end of Pilrig Street, at the junction of Broughton Road.

== History ==
Archaeological excavations in 2006 revealed evidence of an ancient fort thought to be Somerset's Battery which is indicated at this location in the Petworth Map, the contemporary map of the area at the time of the Siege of Leith in 1560 and on which the name Pelrygge appears immediately east of the fort. The archaeological finds are said to be a unique example of 16th century artillery siege works in the UK.

Pilrig House, built in 1638 for Gilbert Kirkwood, appears to have been built at the fort's SW corner. Stonework in the basement walls suggest that the remains of a peel tower, from which the name Pilrig may derive, are incorporated in the house. The Balfour family were involved financially in the failed Darién expedition to colonise Panama in the late 17th century. As part of the Treaty of Union, landed investors were reimbursed in full in 1707. The Balfour family profited from this and became local entrepreneurs, running, amongst other things, a local stagecoach service. Robert Balfour bought Pilrig House in 1709 with the proceeds, and remodelled the house at that time. The house and estate remained in their possession until the 20th century, their name being recalled by Balfour Street, which links the park to Leith Walk.

One inhabitant of the house was Margaret Balfour, mother of Robert Louis Stevenson (fully, Robert Lewis Balfour Stevenson, with Lewis later changed to Louis). Stevenson would undoubtedly be very familiar with this house. The house is directly referred to in Stevenson's "Catriona" ( a plaque on the building refers to this) and may also be the inspiration for the "House of Shaws" in "Kidnapped", an association it shares with Cammo House and Cramond House.

Peripheral estate land was gradually feued to buyers. In 1920, when Edinburgh absorbed the formerly independent Leith, the remaining ground was part of the agreed "settlement" to be given to Leith as a public park. However, this did not fully materialise until the death of the remaining spinster sisters who lived in the house. It was eventually taken over by the local authority just before World War II, after which the house served variously as a fireman's hostel and hostel for homeless women until it became disused in 1970. Following two devastating fires it was virtually razed to the ground, but, with the help of grant aid, was meticulously rebuilt in 1984. Various 19th-century additions were removed to return its exterior to its original form of 1710. At this stage (no original interior remaining) it was divided into 6 flats, and new houses were built between it and Bonnington Road. At roughly the same time a huge railway embankment, which used to enclose the park on its west and north sides, was flattened.

== Pilrig Gibbet ==
A gibbet existed in the locality for many centuries. It was sited somewhere between the current junction of Pilrig Street and Leith Walk and Shrubhill House to the south. Infamous victims included Major Weir in 1670, Robert Garnock in 1680, and Philip Stanfield in 1688 for the murder of his uncle Sir James Stanfield at Newmills House near North Berwick. Philip had been hung at the Mercat Cross on the Royal Mile, but his body was then placed in the gibbet cage at Pilrig, while his head was placed on a pike at the entrance to Haddington.

== Geography ==
Although there are no defined boundaries, the area is generally accepted to include Pilrig Street, Pilrig Park, Balfour Street, Springfield, Dryden Street and Stead's Place. The Pilrig Conservation Area, created in 2013 by the City of Edinburgh Council roughly uses this classification.

The area is bordered by Bonnington to the west, Hopetoun and Shrubhill to the south, Leith Walk to the east and other areas of Leith to the north.

The houses in the area are widely varied, with terraced cottages and larger villas alongside tenements, variously from the Georgian and Victorian periods, and a substantial number of 20th century flats and industrial-unit conversions. Inchkeith Court is a tower block situated alongside Spey Terrace. Shaw's Lane contains Edinburgh's first colony houses.

The area features a variety of tree species thanks to the number of private gardens and public green spaces.

The Pilrig Park Primary School caters for children with Additional Support Needs.

The area is wholly encapsulated within the Leith Walk council ward, the Edinburgh Northern and Leith Scottish Parliament constituency and the Edinburgh North and Leith UK Parliament constituency.

== Transport ==
Historically, Pilrig was the point where passengers were forced to disembark to change from Leith's electrified tram system to Edinburgh's cable tram system. This inconvenience was known as the "Pilrig Muddle" and existed until the late 1920s when Edinburgh electrified its system. The tram was replaced by buses in 1956.

Pilrig is still well served by buses on Leith Walk plus the service 11 on Pilrig Street. The area is also served at its eastern edge by the new Balfour Street tram stop on Leith Walk, which opened to passengers in June 2023.

The course of the railway line, which closed in 1955, is still discernable around the edge of Pilrig Park (formerly running behind Pilrig House) in the form of a strip of "no-mans-land" but the large embankment was largely flattened in the early 1980s. At the same time the railway bridges, carrying the railway a storey above road level, were removed at the Bonnington Road/ Newhaven Road junction and Jane Street/Leith Walk junction. The embankment still survives on the north edge of the industrial estate next to Steads Place.

== Pilrig Church ==
Pilrig Church was one of the largest and most impressive churches built for the Free Church after the Disruption of 1843. It was originally housed in a temporary building south of its current site. The current church was designed by Peddie & Kinnear and completed in 1863. An earlier church existed on the opposite side of the street designed by architect David Cousin who was a member in the congregation. The land was gifted (and much of the cost paid) by the Balfours of Pilrig House. The 46m spire is a local landmark.

Notable ministers are:

- William Garden Blaikie FRSE (1844 – 1868)
- Rev Dr James Calder Macphail DD from 1868 to 1895
- Rev Dr George Macaulay DD (b.1861) from 1898 to 1938

== Notable residents ==
- Rev Lewis Balfour (1777-1860) born in Pilrig House
- Rev Dr James Calder Macphail DD (1821-1908) was minister of Pilrig Church 1868 to 1895 (when it was a Free Church) and a pioneer photographer from 1843. He lived at the manse on Pilrig Street.
- Lady Nairn songwriter, lived on Pilrig Street
- Jane Gordon, Duchess of Gordon lived at Shrubhill House
