= George Moir =

Scottish advocate and author (1800–1870)

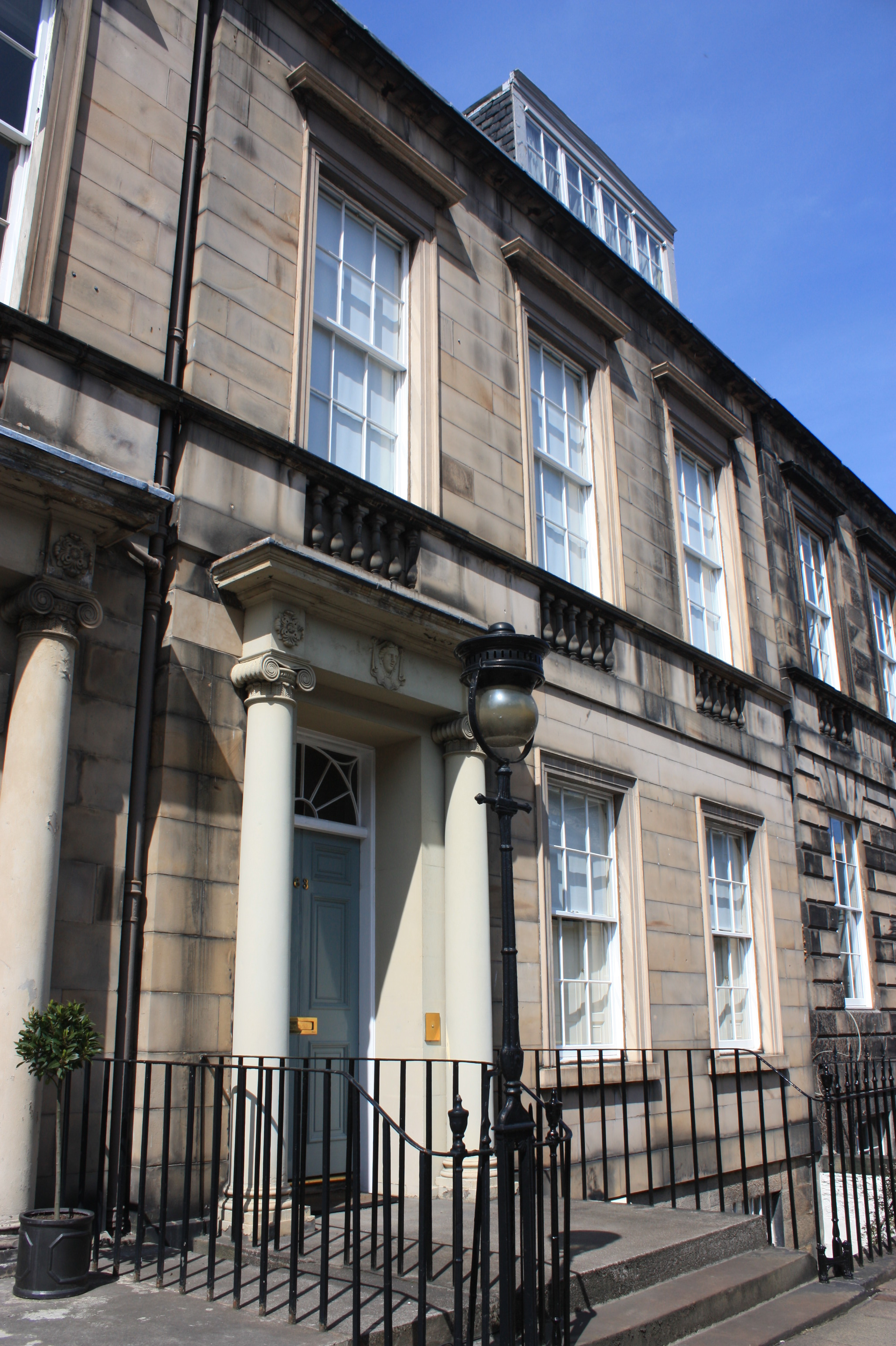
Moir's charming townhouse at 63 Northumberland Street, Edinburgh

George Moir FRSE (1800–1870) was a Scottish advocate and author, amateur artist and early photographer.

== Life ==
The son of George Moir, a vintner running "The Old Ship Inn", he was born in Aberdeen, and educated in the city. Moving to Edinburgh, he entered a lawyer's office and qualified as an advocate in 1825.

In 1824, when Moir was working on an article for the Edinburgh Review, a friend suggested that he might seek information from Sir William Hamilton. They met in the Advocates' Library, and formed a lifelong friendship. On 2 July 1825 Moir was admitted advocate. In 1826 Hamilton proposed Moir as a Fellow of the Royal Society of Edinburgh - he resigned from the Society in 1837.

In the 1830s, he made the acquaintance of Thomas Carlyle who found him "become a conservative, settled everywhere into dilettante, not very happy, I think; dry, civil, and seems to feel unheimlich in my company".

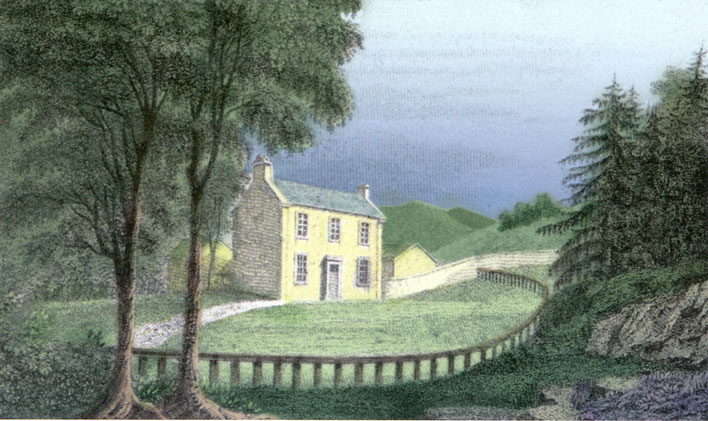
Craigenputtock, a property in the family of Jane Carlyle, 1829 watercolour by George Moir

Carlyle's Life of Schiller, frontispiece to the German translation based on watercolour by George Moir

In the 1830s he is listed as living at 63 Northumberland Street in Edinburgh's Second New Town. In 1830 he married his wife, Flora Towers (d.1858), and this was presumably their family home.

From 1835 to 1840 Moir was Professor of Rhetoric and Belles Lettres in the University of Edinburgh, appointed on the occasion when Carlyle was unsuccessful. He was an early photographer and member of the Edinburgh Calotype Club.

He continued in practice at the Scottish bar, and in 1855 was appointed sheriff of Ross and Cromarty, a post which in 1859 he exchanged for the shrievalty of Stirlingshire. In 1864 the Faculty of Advocates chose Moir as Professor of Scots law at the University of Edinburgh, however due to bad health he resigned in less than a year.

Moir gave up his shrievalty in 1868, and died at his house at 14 Charlotte Square, Edinburgh, on 19 October 1870.

He is buried in the churchyard of St John's Episcopal Church, at the west end of Princes Street.

== Works ==
Originally a Whig in his politics, Moir later sided with the Tories, and became a regular contributor to Blackwood's Magazine. His works are:

- Schiller's Piccolomini and Wallenstein, translated, with a critical preface, Edinburgh, 1827; dedicated to Hamilton.
- Schiller's Thirty Years' War, translated, with biographical notice, 2 vols. Edinburgh, 1828.
- The Appellate Jurisdiction of Scotch Appeals, Edinburgh, 1851.
- Magic and Witchcraft, London, 1852.

Extracts from Moir's lectures were incorporated by William Guthrie in the 14th edition of John Erskine's Principles of the Law of Scotland, 1870. Moir also contributed articles on poetry and modern romance to the Encyclopædia Britannica which, with William Spalding's article on rhetoric, were published as Treatises on Poetry, Modern Romance and Rhetoric (1839).

- Magia e Stregoneria, Lulu Press, Raleigh (NC), 2018, Italian version of Magic and Witchcraft (1852), translated by Rev. Marco Lupi Speranza, ISBN 978-0-24-499659-8.
