= August Krönig =

German chemist and physicist (1822–1879)

August Karl Krönig (German: [ˈkʁøːnɪç]; 20 September 1822 – 5 June 1879) was a German chemist and physicist who published an account of the kinetic theory of gases in 1856, probably after reading a paper by John James Waterston.

== Biography ==
Krönig was born in Schildesche, now part of Bielefeld. After completing his Abitur he attended the University of Bonn for three semesters beginning in 1839 studying primarily Oriental languages. In 1840 he changed focus to physics, chemistry and mathematics and transferred to the University of Berlin, where he completed his doctorate in 1845 with a thesis on chromate salts. He then taught at two schools in Berlin, the Realgymnasium in Cölln and the Königliche Realschule attached to the Friedrich-Wilhelms-Gymnasium in Berlin. In 1864 he was given a professorship, but he was forced to retire the same year for reasons of ill health.

In 1851 Krönig self-published the Journal für Physik und physikalische Chemie des Auslandes in vollständigen Übersichten, but only one year of issues appeared. In 1856 he published a paper on the kinetic theory of gases, thereby becoming a pioneer of statistical mechanics and thermodynamics alongside Rudolf Clausius, James Clerk Maxwell and Ludwig Boltzmann. In his 1856 paper "Grundzüge einer Theorie der Gase" (Outlines of a Theory of Gases), Krönig proposed that gas molecules move in straight lines and collide with one another and with the walls of their container, and that the pressure of a gas results from the impact of its molecules on the container walls. He assumed all molecules move with the same velocity, a simplification later refined by Maxwell and Boltzmann who introduced the concept of a distribution of molecular speeds. Krönig derived from his model a relationship between temperature and the kinetic energy of molecules, and showed that Boyle's law could be derived from these assumptions. Clausius, upon reading Krönig's paper, was spurred to publish his own more rigorous treatment the following year, in which he introduced the concept of mean free path and corrected Krönig's assumption that molecules move only in directions parallel to the coordinate axes. The paper echoes John James Waterston's 1851 paper on the topic, and may be based on it; Clausius' work was sparked by Krönig's paper but emphasised the implication of "equal volumes equal numbers", which Waterston and Krönig merely noted. Krönig also published various writings on science and on philosophy and theology.

He died in Berlin; his remains were reburied in the family grave at the Stahnsdorf South-Western Cemetery, near Berlin.

== Publications ==
- De acidi chromici salibus cristallinis (doctoral thesis), Berlin, 1845
- Neue Methode zur Vermeidung und Auffindung von Rechenfehlern vermittelst der Neuner-, Elfer-, Siebenunddreißiger- und Hundertundeinerprobe. Ein Hülfsmittel für Zahlenrechner, Berlin, 1855
- "Grundzüge einer Theorie der Gase", Annalen der Physik [2]33 (1856), 315
- Die Chemie, bearbeitet als Bildungsmittel für den Verstand zum Gebrauche bei dem chemischen Unterricht an höheren Lehranstalten, Berlin 1864
- Wie kritisirt man chemische Lehrbücher? Eine Antikritik, Berlin, 1865
- Die Werthlosigkeit einer grossen Anzahl von chemischen Formeln: Dargethan durch die Grösse der Fehler in Liebig's Analysen und neues Verfahren zur Ableitung der Formel einer Verbindung aus den Gewichtsmengen der Bestandtheile, Berlin: Julius Springer, 1866
- Das Dasein Gottes und das Glück der Menschen, materialistisch-erfahrungsphilosophische Studien, insbesondere über die Gottesfrage und den Darwinismus, über den Selbstbeglückungstrieb als Fundament der Lebensweisheit und praktischen Moral und über die Hauptlehren Kant's und Schopenhauer's, Berlin, 1874
- Sechs neue Rezepte betr. billige Ernährung, Berlin, 1874

== See also ==
- Ideal gas law

== Sources ==
- "August Krönig". In: J. C. Poggendorff. Biographisch-literarisches Handwörterbuch der exacten Wissenschaften, Leipzig, 1863, Volume 1, p. 752; 1898, Volume 3, p. 752
- Stefan Wolff. "August Krönig". In: Dieter Hoffmann, Hubert Leitko and Staffan Müller-Wille, eds. Lexikon bedeutender Naturwissenschaftler. Wiesbaden-Heidelberg, 2004, ISBN 3-8274-0401-0, Volume 2, p. 345
- Fritz Krafft. Die wichtigsten Naturwissenschaftler im Porträt. Wiesbaden, 2007, ISBN 978-3-86539-911-3, p. 210
- Michael Gamper. Masse lesen, Masse schreiben. Eine Diskurs- und Imaginationsgeschichte. Munich, 2007, ISBN 978-3-7705-4436-3, pp. 437–38
