= Robert Tennent (photographer) =

Scottish photographer

Robert Tennent FRSE (1815 - 15 December 1890) was an early Scottish photographer and major landowner in Australia.

== Life ==
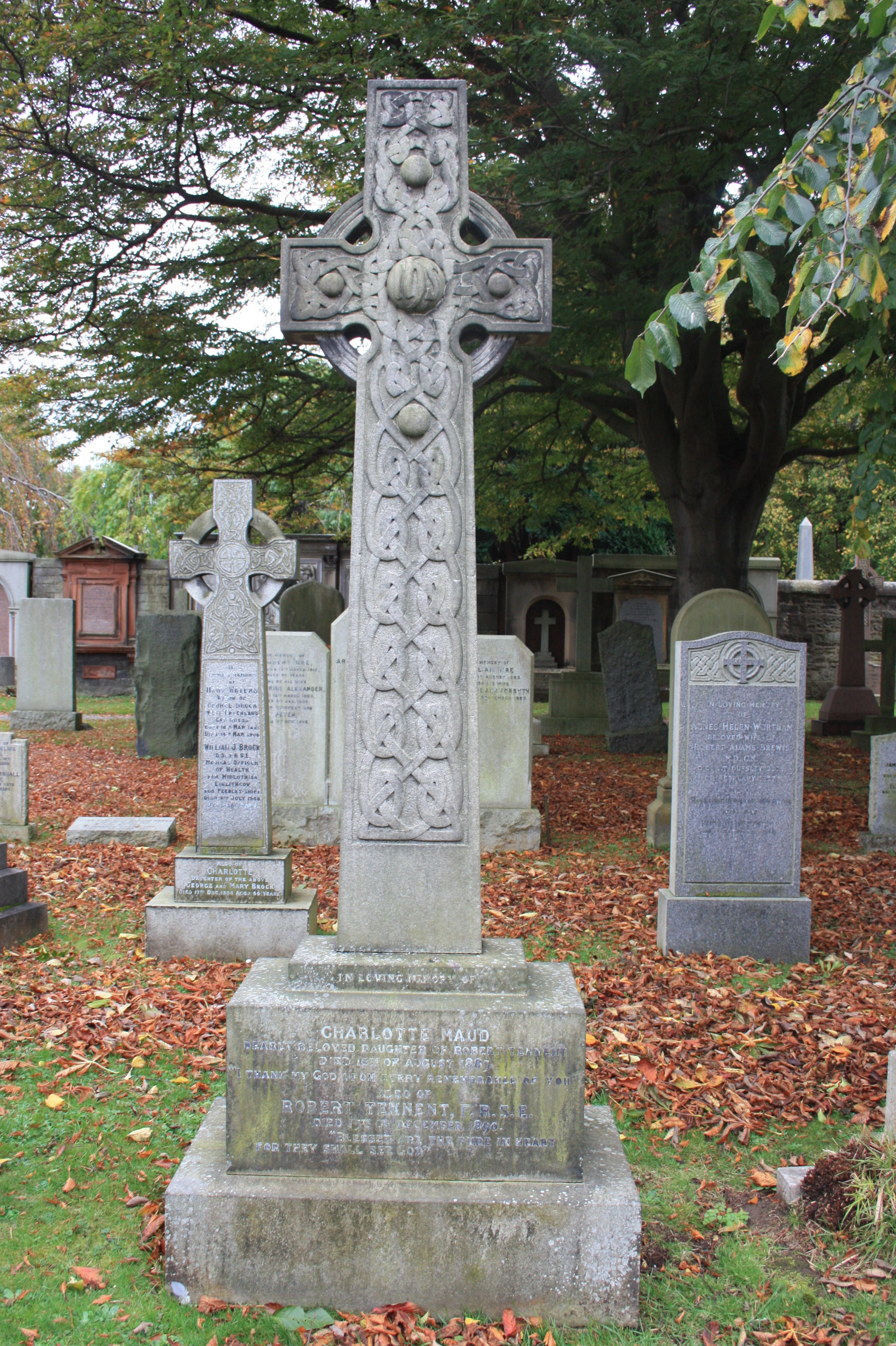
The grave of Robert Tennent, Dean Cemetery, Edinburgh

He was born in Edinburgh in 1813 the son of Margaret Rodger Lyon (1794-1867) and Patrick Tennant WS (1782-1872), living at 107 George Street. His younger brother was Hugh Lyon Tennent. The family were related to the Tennents Brewery in Glasgow.

He was educated at Edinburgh Academy.

Robert was a keen sailor and made a trip of the Western Isles in 1838.

In 1839 he sailed from Leith to Tasmania, arriving in June. In October he sailed to Port Phillip in Australia. Here together with Charles Hugh Lyon (probably his cousin) he acquired 30,000 acres of land near Gnarkeet under squatters rights from 1844 to 1853. He also held 75,000 acres near Portland Bay.

He returned to Edinburgh in 1853 and was a member of the Edinburgh Calotype Club alongside his brother and other notable members David Brewster and John Cay.

In 1873 he was elected a Fellow of the Royal Society of Edinburgh his proposer being John Hutton Balfour.

He died at 23 Buckingham Terrace in western Edinburgh on 15 December 1890 aged 77. He is buried with his daughter Charlotte Maud Tennent in Dean Cemetery in western Edinburgh. The granite cross lies in the first northern extension not far from his brother Hugh.

== Family ==
In 1858, aged 45, he was married to Wilhelmina Meldrum at Kincaple in Fife.
