= John James Waterston =

Scottish civil engineer and physicist

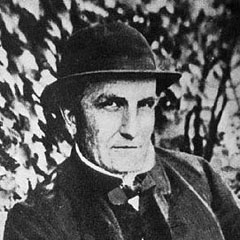
John James Waterston

John James Waterston (1811 – 18 June 1883) was a Scottish physicist and a neglected pioneer of the kinetic theory of gases.

== Early life ==
Waterston's father, George, was an Edinburgh sealing wax manufacturer and stationer, a relative of the Sandeman family Robert and his brother, George. John was born, the sixth of nine children, into a family alive with interests in literature, science and music. He was educated at Edinburgh High School before becoming apprenticed as a civil engineer to Messrs. Grainger and Miller. His employers encouraged him to attend lectures at the University of Edinburgh. He studied mathematics and physics under Sir John Leslie as well as attending lectures in chemistry, anatomy and surgery and becoming an active participant in the student literary society.

At age nineteen, Waterston published a paper proposing a mechanical explanation of gravitation, accounting for action at a distance in terms of colliding particles and discussing interactions between linear and rotational motion that would play a part in his later kinetic theory. He proposed that ether is made of small cylindrical particles, and collisions with large matter particles would transfer rotational motion into linear motion, locally increasing the speed of the ether particles, which he claimed would lower the density of the ether and create an attractive force.

Waterston moved to London at age twenty-one, where he worked as a railroad surveyor, becoming an associate of the Institution of Civil Engineers and publishing a paper on a graphical method for planning earthworks. The travel and disruption associated with his surveying work left Waterston little time to pursue his studies so he joined the hydrography department of the Admiralty under Francis Beaufort. It was Beaufort who, in 1839, supported Waterston for the post of naval instructor for cadets of the East India Company in Bombay. The posting worked well for Waterston who was able to pursue his reading and research at the library of Grant College.

== Kinetic theory ==
Building on his theory of the mechanical explanation of gravity, he was the first to develop the kinetic theory, independently of earlier and equally neglected partial accounts by Daniel Bernoulli and John Herapath. He published it, at his own expense, in his book Thoughts on the Mental Functions (1843). He correctly derived all the consequences of the premise that gas pressure is a function of the number of molecules per unit volume, N; molecular mass, M; and molecular mean-squared velocity, $\bar{v^2}$. He established the relationship:

$$P=NM\bar{v^2}$$.

He had been motivated to think of a wave theory of heat by analogy with the wave theory of light and some experiments by James Forbes and Macedonio Melloni on radiant heat. His statement that ... in mixed media the mean square molecular velocity is inversely proportional to the specific weight of the molecules has been seen as the first statement of the equipartition theorem for translational motion. Waterston grasped that, while the kinetic energy of an individual molecule with velocity $v$ is $\frac{1}{2}mv^2$, heat energy is proportional to temperature $T$. That insight led him to derive the ideal gas law:

$$\frac {PV} {T} = \mbox{a constant}$$.

The publication made little impact, perhaps because of the title. He submitted his theory, under Beaufort's sponsorship, to the Royal Society in 1845 but was rejected. Referee Sir John William Lubbock wrote The paper is nothing but nonsense.

Unable to retrieve a copy of his paper (he had failed to make a copy for himself before submitting the paper to the Royal Society), he rewrote the work and sought to advertise it elsewhere, attracting little attention other than from William John Macquorn Rankine and Hermann von Helmholtz through whom it may have influenced August Krönig. The theory gained acceptance only when it was proposed by Rudolf Clausius and James Clerk Maxwell in the 1850s by which time Waterston's contribution had been forgotten.

== Later life ==
He returned to Edinburgh in 1857 to pursue his own novel physical ideas but met with unyielding neglect and discouragement from the scientific establishment. Neglect was exacerbated by his own increasing reclusiveness and hostility to the learned societies. He worked on acoustics, astronomy, fluid mechanics and thermodynamics.

In 1858, 27 years after he published his theory of the mechanical explanation of gravity and 15 years after publishing the kinetic theory, he continued to push for others to explore his ideas on gravity without much avail.

He left his Edinburgh home on 18 June and drowned in a nearby canal, possibly falling into the canal due to heat stress from his astronomical observation activities.

== Recognition after death ==
As discussed above, Waterston's paper submitted to the Royal Society was rejected. Some years after Waterston's death, Lord Rayleigh (Secretary of Royal Society at that time) managed to dig it out from the archives of the Royal Society. Finally, Waterston's paper was published in the Philosophical Transactions of the Royal Society in 1892. (Please see below.)

Rayleigh felt that Waterston's case was not an aberration, but the norm:

"The history of [Waterston's] paper suggests that highly speculative investigations, especially by an unknown author, are best brought before the world through some other channel than a scientific society, which naturally hesitates to admit into its printed records matter of uncertain value. Perhaps one may go further, and say that a young author who believes himself capable of great things would usually do well to secure favourable recognition of the scientific world by work whose scope is limited, and whose value is easily judged, before embarking upon higher flights."

== See also ==
- John Herapath, another contemporaneous English physicist who also worked on the kinetic theory, and whose work was also neglected at the time

== Bibliography ==
- J.J. Waterston, "On the physics of media that are composed of free and perfectly elastic molecules in a state of motion", Philosophical Transactions of the Royal Society of London A, vol. 183 (1892), pp. 1–79. (Note: Waterston died in 1883 and his paper was published some years after his death.)
- Haldane, J. S. (ed.) (1928) The Collected Scientific Papers of John James Waterston, including a biography by Haldane.
- Brush, S. G. (1957) "The development of the kinetic theory of gases: II. Waterston", Annals of Science, vol. 13, pp275–282
- - (1961) "John James Waterston and the kinetic theory of gases", American Scientist, vol. 49, pp202–214
- Daub, E. E. (1970) "Waterston, Rankine and Clausius on the kinetic theory of gases", Isis vol. 61, pp105–106
