= Margaret Maria Gordon =

Scottish writer (1823–1907)

- photograph of Margaret Maria Gordon by David Octavius Hill and Robert Adamson, probably taken in 1843
- Born: October 1823
- Died: November 8, 1907; Melrose
- Spouse(s): John Gordon Cumming Skene of Pitlurg and Dyce
- Parents: David Brewster (father); Juliet Macpherson (mother)

Margaret Maria Brewster Gordon (October 1823 – November 8, 1907) was a Scottish novelist and author.

Margaret Maria Brewster was born in October 1823, the daughter of renowned scientist Sir David Brewster and Juliet MacPherson Brewster, daughter of James Macpherson, author of the notorious Ossian poems. Among her father's interests was early photography, and he worked with photo pioneers David Octavius Hill and Robert Adamson. Hill and Adamson's photograph of her, probably from 1843, makes her one of the earliest Scottish women to be photographed. In 1860, she married John Gordon-Cumming-Skene of Pitlurg and Parkhill.

Margaret Gordon's works were largely religious and instructional. She wrote biographies of her father, her husband, and Hay MacDowall Grant. The Dictionary of National Biography describes her memoir of her father as a "sympathetic but largely domestic biography which remains the major contemporary source for Brewster's life" She also wrote several novels, including Lady Elinor Mordaunt (1860), whose plot was described as "The heroine first reforms a lord, then carries on her good work among the negroes."

Margaret Maria Gordon died in Melrose on November 8, 1907.

== Bibliography ==
- The Fortunes of the Falconers. 3 vol. London: Saunders and Otley, 1844.
- Kingsconnell: A Tale. 3 vol. London: T. C. Newby, 1850.
- Musgrave: A Story of Gilsland Spa, and Other Tales. 2 vol. London: Hope, 1851.
- Work; or, Plenty to Do and How to Do It. Edinburgh, 1853.
- Sir Gervase Grey: A Novel. 3 vol. London: T. C. Newby, 1854.
- Sunbeams in the Cottage; or, What Women May Do. Edinburgh, 1854.
- Little Millie and her Four Places. 1 vol. Edinburgh: Thomas Constable, 1855.
- Little Ben. New York, 1856.
- The Word and the World (3rd edition) Edinburgh, 1856.
- Letters from Cannes and Nice. Edinburgh: T. Constable, 1857.
- Household Economy: A Manual Intended for Female Training Colleges, and the Senior Classes of Girls' Schools. Constable's Educational Series: Edinburgh, 1858.
- Lady Elinor Mordaunt: or, Sunbeams in the Castle. 1 vol. Edinburgh: Edmonston and Douglas, 1860.
- Leaves of Healing, for the Sick and Sorrowful. Edinburgh, 1860.
- The Motherless Boy: A Tale. Edinburgh, 1860.
- The Sabbath a Delight; or, Bible Pictures and Stories for the Family. London, 1862.
- Prevention; or, An Appeal to Economy and Common Sense. Edinburgh, 1862.
- Fashions of the Period; or, How Do You Dress? London, 1868.
- The Double Cure; or, What is a Medical Mission? London, 1869.
- The Home Life of Sir David Brewster. Edinburgh, 1869.
- Rights and Wrongs; or, Begin at Home. London, 1869.
- Workers. Edinburgh, 1871.
- Chief Women; or, Higher Life in High Places. London, 1874.
- Hay MacDowall Grant of Arndilly: His Life, Labours, and Teaching. London, 1876.
- Sanctification Through Faith. London, 1878.
- Our Daughters: An Account of the Young Women's Christian Association and Institute Union. Edinburgh, 1879.
- John Gordon of Pitlurg and Parkhill; or, Memories of a Standard-Bearer. London, 1885.
