= David Brewster =

British astronomer and mathematician (1781–1868)

Sir David Brewster KH FRS FRSSA MICE
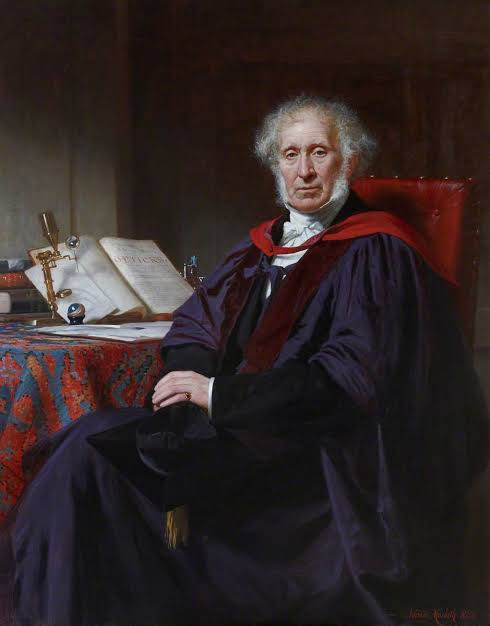
- Brewster, c. 1824.

Principal of the University of Edinburgh
- In office 1859–1868
- Preceded by: John Lee
- Succeeded by: Sir Alexander Grant

1st Principal of the University of St Andrews
- In office 1837–1859
- Succeeded by: Reverend John Tulloch

Personal details
- Born: 11 December 1781 Canongate, Jedburgh, Roxburghshire, Scotland
- Died: 10 February 1868 (aged 86) Allerly House, Gattonside, Roxburghshire, Scotland
- Scientific career
- Education: University of Edinburgh
- Known for: Brewster's angle Brewsterite; Edge tessellation Kaleidoscope; Optical mineralogy Photoelasticity; Physical optics Polarized light microscopy Purple fringing Spirit photography Stereoscope
- Spouses: Juliet Macpherson (m. 1810; died 1850) Jane Kirk Purnell (m. 1857)
- Children: 5 (including Margaret Maria Gordon)
- Awards: Copley Medal (1815); Keith Prize (1827–29, 1829–31); Royal Medal (1830); Pour le Mérite (1847)
- Fields: Physics, mathematics, astronomy

Notes
- Founding Director of the Scottish Society of Arts (1821)

Sir David Brewster (11 December 1781 – 10 February 1868) was a British scientist, inventor, author, and academic administrator. In science he is principally remembered for his experimental work in physical optics, mostly concerned with the study of the polarization of light and including the discovery of Brewster's angle. He studied the birefringence of crystals under compression and discovered photoelasticity, thereby creating the field of optical mineralogy. For this work, William Whewell dubbed him the "father of modern experimental optics" and "the Johannes Kepler of optics."

Brewster was a pioneer in photography. He invented an improved stereoscope, which he called "lenticular stereoscope" and which became the first portable 3D-viewing device. He also invented the stereoscopic camera, two types of polarimeters, the polyzonal lens, the lighthouse illuminator, and the kaleidoscope.

Brewster was a devout Presbyterian and marched arm-in-arm with his brother during the events of the Disruption of 1843, which led to the formation of the Free Church of Scotland. As a historian of science, Brewster focused on the life and work of his hero, Isaac Newton. Brewster published a detailed biography of Newton in 1831 and later became the first scholar to examine many of the papers in Newton's Nachlass (the unpublished documents left after his death). Brewster also wrote numerous works of popular science, and was one of the founders of the British Science Association, of which he was elected president in 1849. He became the public face of higher education in Scotland, serving as Principal of the University of St Andrews (1837–1859) and later of the University of Edinburgh (1859–1868). Brewster also edited the 18-volume Edinburgh Encyclopædia.

== Life ==
David Brewster was born in the Canongate in Jedburgh, Roxburghshire, to Margaret Key (1753–1790) and James Brewster (c. 1735–1815), the rector of Jedburgh Grammar School and a teacher of high reputation. David was the third of six children, two daughters and four sons: James (1777–1847), minister at Craig, Ferryden; David; George (1784–1855), minister at Scoonie, Fife; and Patrick (1788–1859), minister at the abbey church, Paisley.

At the age of 12, David Brewster matriculated at the University of Edinburgh with the intention of becoming a clergyman. He received his MA in 1800, was licensed as a minister of the Church of Scotland, and then preached around Edinburgh on several occasions. By then, Brewster had already shown a strong inclination for the natural sciences and had established a close association with James Veitch of Inchbonny. Veitch, who enjoyed a local reputation as a man of science and was particularly skilled in making telescopes, was characterized by Sir Walter Scott as a "self-taught philosopher, astronomer and mathematician".

Brewster is buried in the grounds of Melrose Abbey, in Roxburghshire.

== Career ==
=== Work on optics ===
Though Brewster duly finished his theological studies and was licensed to preach, his other interests distracted him from the duties of his profession. In 1799 fellow-student Henry Brougham persuaded him to study the diffraction of light. The results of his investigations were communicated from time to time in papers to the Philosophical Transactions of London and other scientific journals. The fact that other scientists – notably Étienne-Louis Malus and Augustin Fresnel – were pursuing the same investigations contemporaneously in France does not invalidate Brewster's claim to independent discovery, even though in one or two cases the priority must be assigned to others. A lesser-known classmate of his, Thomas Dick, also went on to become a popular astronomical writer.

The most important subjects of his inquiries can be enumerated under the following five headings:

1. The laws of light polarization by reflection and refraction, and other quantitative laws of phenomena;
2. The discovery of the polarising structure induced by heat and pressure;
3. The discovery of crystals with two axes of double refraction, and many of the laws of their phenomena, including the connection between optical structure and crystalline forms;
4. The laws of metallic reflection;
5. Experiments on the absorption of light.

In this line of investigation, the prime importance belongs to the discovery of

1. the connection between the refractive index and the polarizing angle;
2. biaxial crystals, and
3. the production of double refraction by irregular heating.

These discoveries were promptly recognised. As early as 1807 the degree of LL.D. was conferred upon Brewster by Marischal College, Aberdeen; in 1815 he was elected a Fellow of the Royal Society of London, and received the Copley Medal; and in 1816 the French Institute awarded him one-half of the prize of three thousand francs for the two most important discoveries in physical science made in Europe during the two preceding years. In 1821, he was made a foreign member of the Royal Swedish Academy of Sciences, and in 1822 a Foreign Honorary Member of the American Academy of Arts and Sciences.

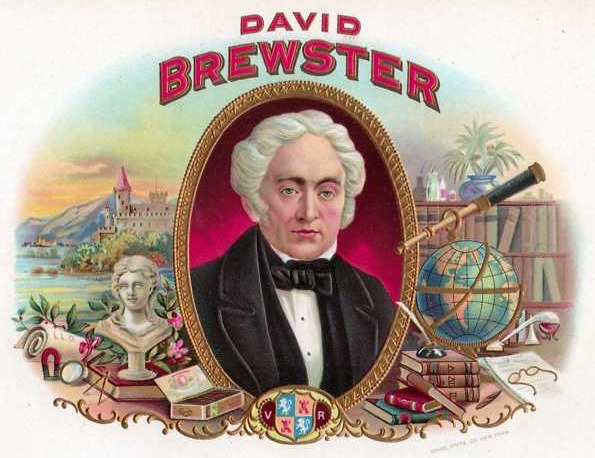
Inner picture of a cigar box from the early 1900s with a portrait of Brewster.

Among the non-scientific public, his fame spread more effectually by his invention in about 1815 of the kaleidoscope, for which there was a great demand in both the United Kingdom, France, and the United States. As a reflection of this fame, Brewster's portrait was later printed in some cigar boxes. Brewster chose renowned achromatic lens developer Philip Carpenter as the sole manufacturer of the kaleidoscope in 1817. Although Brewster patented the kaleidoscope in 1817 (GB 4136), a copy of the prototype was shown to London opticians and copied before the patent was granted. As a consequence, the kaleidoscope became produced in large numbers, but yielded no direct financial benefits to Brewster. It proved to be a massive success with two hundred thousand kaleidoscopes sold in London and Paris in just three months.

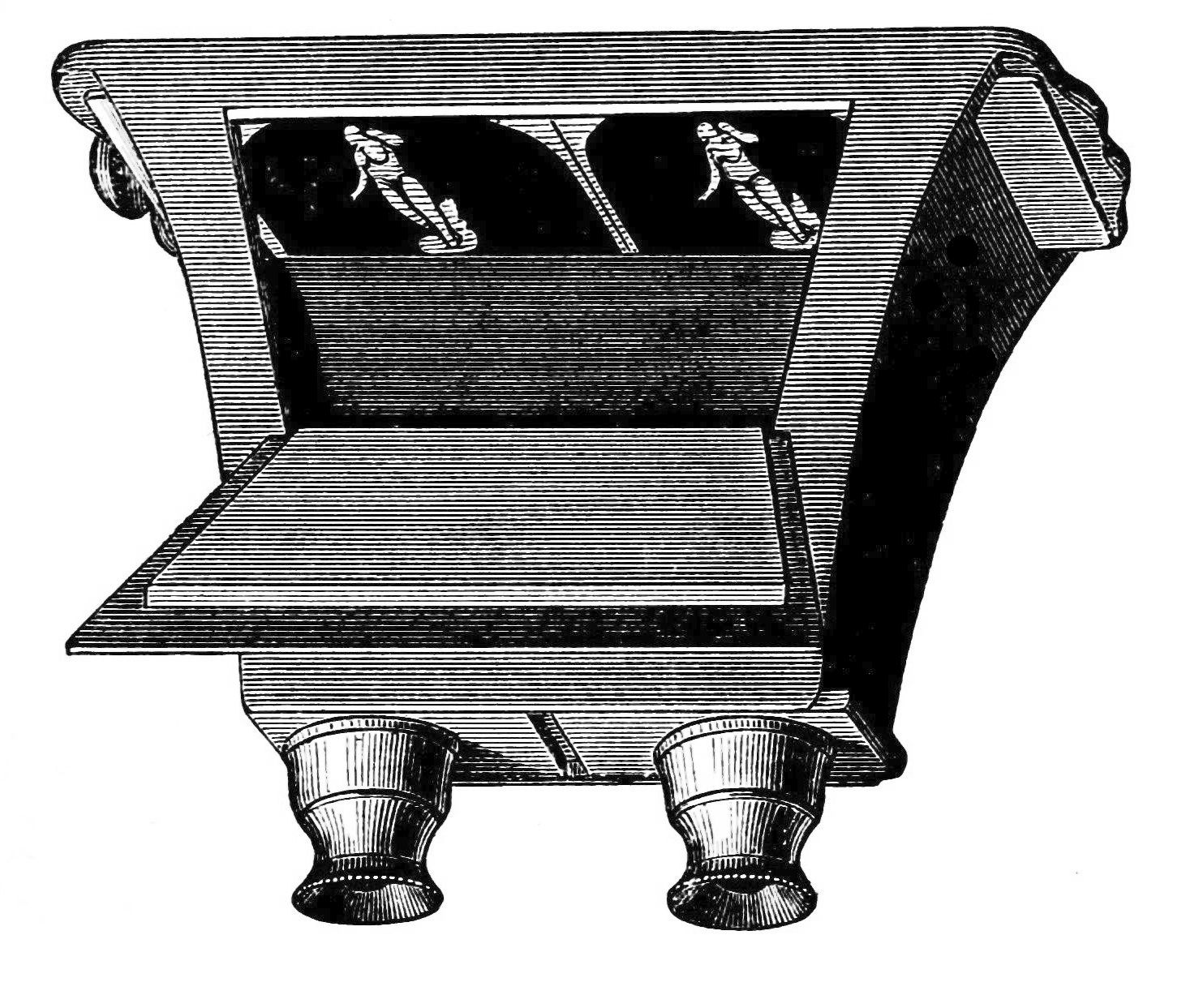
The Brewster stereoscope, 1849.

An instrument of more significance, the stereoscope, which – though of much later date (1849) – along with the kaleidoscope did more than anything else to popularise his name, was not as has often been asserted the invention of Brewster. Sir Charles Wheatstone discovered its principle and applied it as early as 1838 to the construction of a cumbersome but effective instrument, in which the binocular pictures were made to combine by means of mirrors. A dogged rival of Wheatstone's, Brewster was unwilling to credit him with the invention, however, and proposed that the true author of the stereoscope was a Mr. Elliot, a "Teacher of Mathematics" from Edinburgh, who, according to Brewster, had conceived of the principles as early as 1823 and had constructed a lensless and mirrorless prototype in 1839, through which one could view drawn landscape transparencies, since photography had yet to be invented. Brewster's personal contribution was the suggestion to use prisms for uniting the dissimilar pictures; and accordingly the lenticular stereoscope may fairly be said to be his invention.

A much more valuable and practical result of Brewster's optical researches was the improvement of the British lighthouse system. Although Fresnel, who had also the satisfaction of being the first to put it into operation, perfected the dioptric apparatus independently, Brewster was active earlier in the field than Fresnel, describing the dioptric apparatus in 1812. Brewster pressed its adoption on those in authority at least as early as 1820, two years before Fresnel suggested it, and it was finally introduced into lighthouses mainly through Brewster's persistent efforts.

=== Other work ===
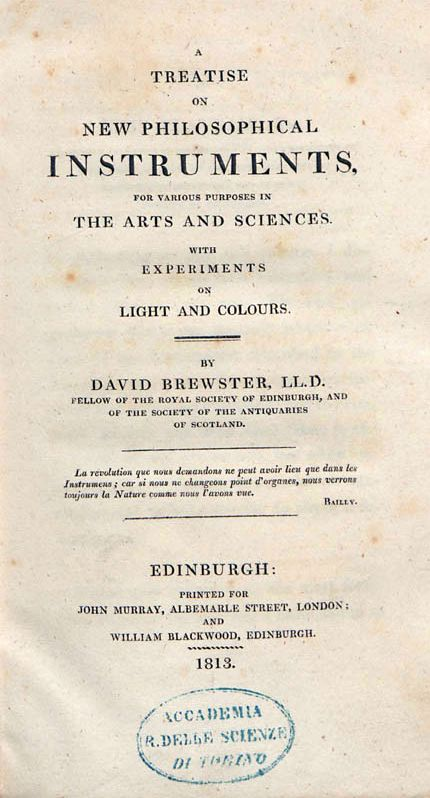
Treatise on new philosophical instruments for various purposes in the arts and sciences, 1813

Although Brewster's own discoveries were important, they were not his only service to science. He began writing in 1799 as a regular contributor to the Edinburgh Magazine, of which he acted as editor 1802–1803 at the age of twenty. In 1807, he undertook the editorship of the newly projected Edinburgh Encyclopædia, of which the first part appeared in 1808, and the last not until 1830. The work was strongest in the scientific department, and many of its most valuable articles were from the pen of the editor. At a later period he was one of the leading contributors to the Encyclopædia Britannica (seventh and eighth editions) writing, among others, the articles on electricity, hydrodynamics, magnetism, microscope, optics, stereoscope, and voltaic electricity. He was elected a member of the American Antiquarian Society in 1816.

In 1819 Brewster undertook further editorial work by establishing, in conjunction with Robert Jameson (1774–1854), the Edinburgh Philosophical Journal, which took the place of the Edinburgh Magazine. The first ten volumes (1819–1824) were published under the joint editorship of Brewster and Jameson, the remaining four volumes (1825–1826) being edited by Jameson alone. After parting company with Jameson, Brewster started the Edinburgh Journal of Science in 1824, 16 volumes of which appeared under his editorship during the years 1824–1832, with very many articles from his own pen.

He contributed around three hundred papers to the transactions of various learned societies, and few of his contemporaries wrote as much for the various reviews. In the North British Review alone, seventy-five articles of his appeared. A list of his larger separate works will be found below. Special mention, however, must be made of the most important of them all: his biography of Sir Isaac Newton. In 1831 he published the Life of Sir Isaac Newton, a short popular account of the philosopher's life, in Murray's Family Library, followed by an 1832 American edition in Harper's Family Library; but it was not until 1855 that he was able to issue the much fuller Memoirs of the Life, Writings and Discoveries of Sir Isaac Newton, a work which embodied the results of more than 20 years' investigation of original manuscripts and other available sources.

Brewster's position as editor brought him into frequent contact with the most eminent scientific men, and he was naturally among the first to recognise the benefit that would accrue from regular communication among those in the field of science. In a review of Charles Babbage's book Decline of Science in England in John Murray's Quarterly Review, he suggested the creation of "an association of our nobility, clergy, gentry and philosophers". This was taken up by various Declinarians and found speedy realisation in the British Association for the Advancement of Science. Its first meeting was held at York in 1831; and Brewster, along with Babbage and Sir John Herschel, had the chief part in shaping its constitution.

In the same year in which the British Association held its first meeting, Brewster received the honour of knighthood and the decoration of the Royal Guelphic Order. In 1838, he was appointed Principal of the united colleges of St Salvator and St Leonard, University of St Andrews. In 1849, he acted as president of the British Association and was elected one of the eight foreign associates of the Institute of France in succession to J. J. Berzelius; and ten years later, he accepted the office of principal of the University of Edinburgh, the duties of which he discharged until within a few months of his death. In 1855, the government of France made him an Officier de la Légion d'honneur.

He was a close friend of William Henry Fox Talbot, inventor of the calotype process, who sent Brewster early examples of his work. It was Brewster who suggested Talbot only patent his process in England, initiating the development of early photography in Scotland and eventually allowing for the formation of the first photographic society in the world, the Edinburgh Calotype Club, in 1843. Brewster was a prominent member of the club until its dissolution sometime in the mid-1850s; however, his interest in photography continued, and he was elected the first President of the Photographic Society of Scotland when it was founded in 1856.

Of a high-strung and nervous temperament, Brewster was somewhat irritable in matters of controversy; but he was repeatedly subjected to serious provocation. He was a man of highly honourable and fervently religious character. In estimating his place among scientific discoverers, the chief thing to be borne in mind is that his genius was not characteristically mathematical. His method was empirical, and the laws that he established were generally the result of repeated experiment. To the ultimate explanation of the phenomena with which he dealt he contributed nothing, and it is noteworthy although he did not maintain to the end of his life the corpuscular theory he never explicitly adopted the wave theory of light. Few would dispute the verdict of James David Forbes, an editor of the eighth edition of the Encyclopædia Britannica: "His scientific glory is different in kind from that of Young and Fresnel; but the discoverer of the law of polarization of biaxial crystals, of optical mineralogy, and of double refraction by compression, will always occupy a foremost rank in the intellectual history of the age." In addition to the various works of Brewster already mentioned, the following may be added: Notes and Introduction to Carlyle's translation of Legendre's Elements of Geometry (1824); Treatise on Optics (1831); Letters on Natural Magic, addressed to Sir Walter Scott (1832) The Martyrs of Science, or the Lives of Galileo, Tycho Brahe, and Kepler (1841); More Worlds than One (1854).

In his Treatise he demonstrated that vegetal colors were related with the absorption spectra and he described for the first time the red fluorescence of chlorophyll.

=== History of Scottish Freemasonry ===
As well as his many scientific works and biographies of notable scientists, Brewster also wrote The History of Free Masonry, Drawn from Authentic Sources of Information; with an Account of the Grand Lodge of Scotland, from Its Institution in 1736, to the Present Time, published in 1804, when he was only 23. The work was commissioned by Alexander Lawrie, publisher to the Grand Lodge of Scotland, to whom the work has been, frequently, mis-attributed. Given that the book bears Lawrie's name and not Brewster's this is understandable. The book became one of the standard works on early Scottish freemasonry although it has been largely superseded by later works. There is no evidence that Brewster was a Freemason at the time he wrote the book, nor any that he became one later.

=== Opposition to evolution ===
Brewster's Christian beliefs stirred him to respond against the idea of the transmutation of species and the theory of evolution. His opinion was that "science and religion must be one since each dealt with Truth, which had only one and the same Author." In 1845 he wrote a highly critical review of the evolutionist work Vestiges of the Natural History of Creation, in the North British Review. which he considered to be an insult to Christian revelation and a dangerous example of materialism.

In 1862, he responded to Darwin's On the Origin of Species and published the article The Facts and Fancies of Mr Darwin in Good Words. He stated that Darwin's book combined both "interesting facts and idle fancies" which made up a "dangerous and degrading speculation". He accepted adaptive changes, but he strongly opposed Darwin's statement about the primordial form, which he considered an offensive idea to "both the naturalist and the Christian."

== Family ==
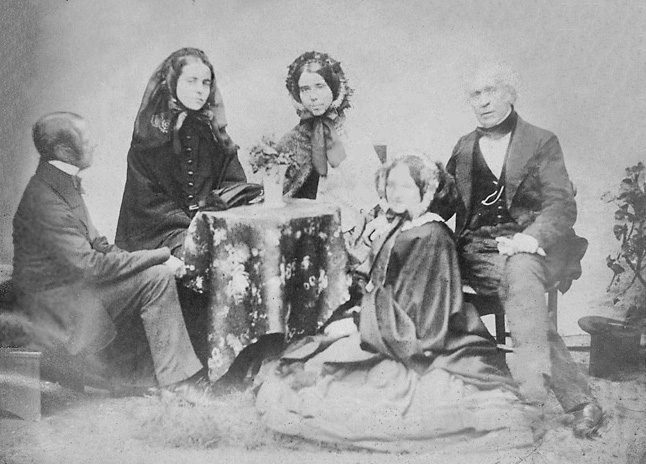
Calvert Jones, Lady Brewster (Jane Kirk Purnell), Mrs. Jones, David Brewster and Miss Parnell (seated)

Brewster married twice. His first wife, Juliet Macpherson (c. 1776–1850), was a daughter of James Macpherson (1736–1796), a probable translator of Ossian poems. They married on 31 July 1810 in Edinburgh and had four sons and a daughter:

- James (1812–)
- Charles Macpherson (1813–1828), drowned.
- David Edward Brewster (17 August 1815 - 1878) became a military officer (Lieutenant Colonel) serving in India and laird of the Belleville estate in Badenoch on the death of his aunt, Ann Macpherson, in 1862.
- Henry Craigie (1816–1905) became a military officer and photographer.
- Margaret Maria Gordon (1823–1907) wrote a book on Brewster, which is considered the most comprehensive description of his life.

In 1833, Brewster's sister-in-law, Ann Macpherson, became laird of Belleville on the death of her half-brother, James. Brewster interested himself in the affairs of the estate with a view to promoting agricultural improvement. He gave the tenants the security of seven-year leases but his overbearing behaviour towards both them and their laird made him unpopular locally.

Brewster married a second time in Nice, on 26 (or 27) March 1857, to Jane Kirk Purnell (b. 1827), the second daughter of Thomas Purnell of Scarborough. Lady Brewster famously fainted at the Oxford evolution debate of 30 June 1860. Brewster died in 1868, and was buried at Melrose Abbey, next to his first wife and second son.

== Recognition and modern references ==
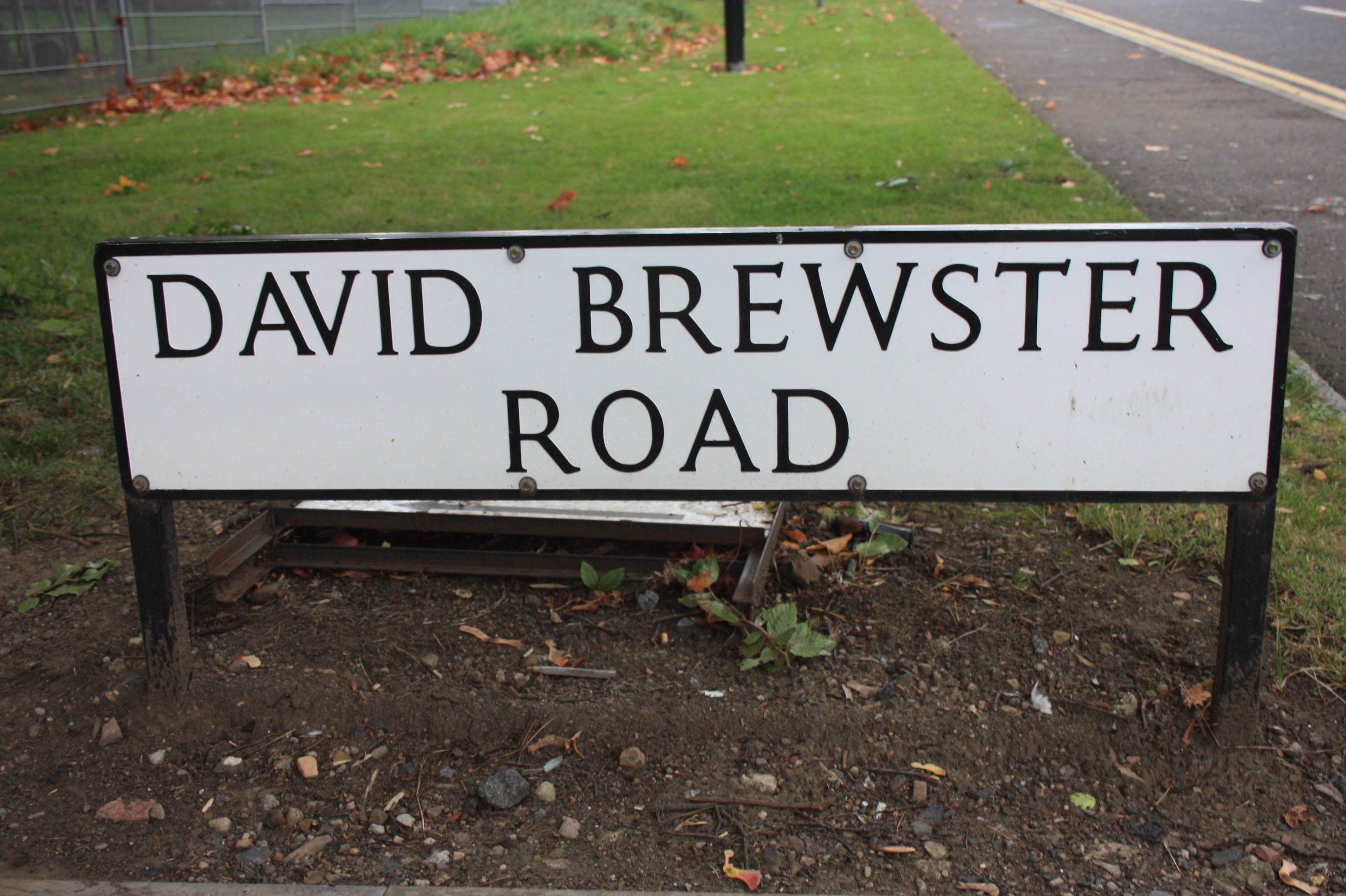
Street sign in Kings Buildings, Edinburgh to the memory of David Brewster

A bust of Brewster is placed in the Hall of Heroes of the National Wallace Monument in Stirling, Scotland. A street within the Kings Buildings complex, which houses most of the Edinburgh University's science buildings, was named in his memory in 2015. The physics building at Heriot-Watt University is also named in his honour.

Edwin H. Land's invention of the Polaroid film was inspired by the account of the optical properties of herapathite that he encountered in Brewster's book The Kaleidoscope, Its History, Theory, and Construction, which Land first read while an undergraduate at Harvard University in 1926.

Brewster's views on the possibility of evolution of intelligence on other planets, contrasted with the opinion of William Whewell, are cited in the novel Barchester Towers.

He appears as a minor antagonist in the 2015 video game Assassin's Creed Syndicate as a scientist working for the game's opposing faction. He is assassinated by one of the protagonists, Evie Frye. He features as a character in Ali Bacon's novel, In the Blink of an Eye (2018). Daibhidh Eyre's Scottish Gaelic science fiction novel, Cailèideascop (2017) features fictionalised notebooks written by Brewster during the development of the kaleidoscope.

== See also ==
- Brewster's angle
- Coddington magnifier
- Brewster crater
- Brewsterite
- Physical crystallography before X-rays

== Sources ==
- Gordon, Margaret Maria (1881). The home life of sir David Brewster. D. Douglas. pp. 221–236. Downloadable archive copy

Academic offices
Preceded by	Principal of the University of St Andrews; 1837–1859	Succeeded by Reverend John Tulloch
Preceded by John Lee	Edinburgh University Principals; 1859–1868	Succeeded by Sir Alexander Grant
