= Edinburgh Calotype Club =

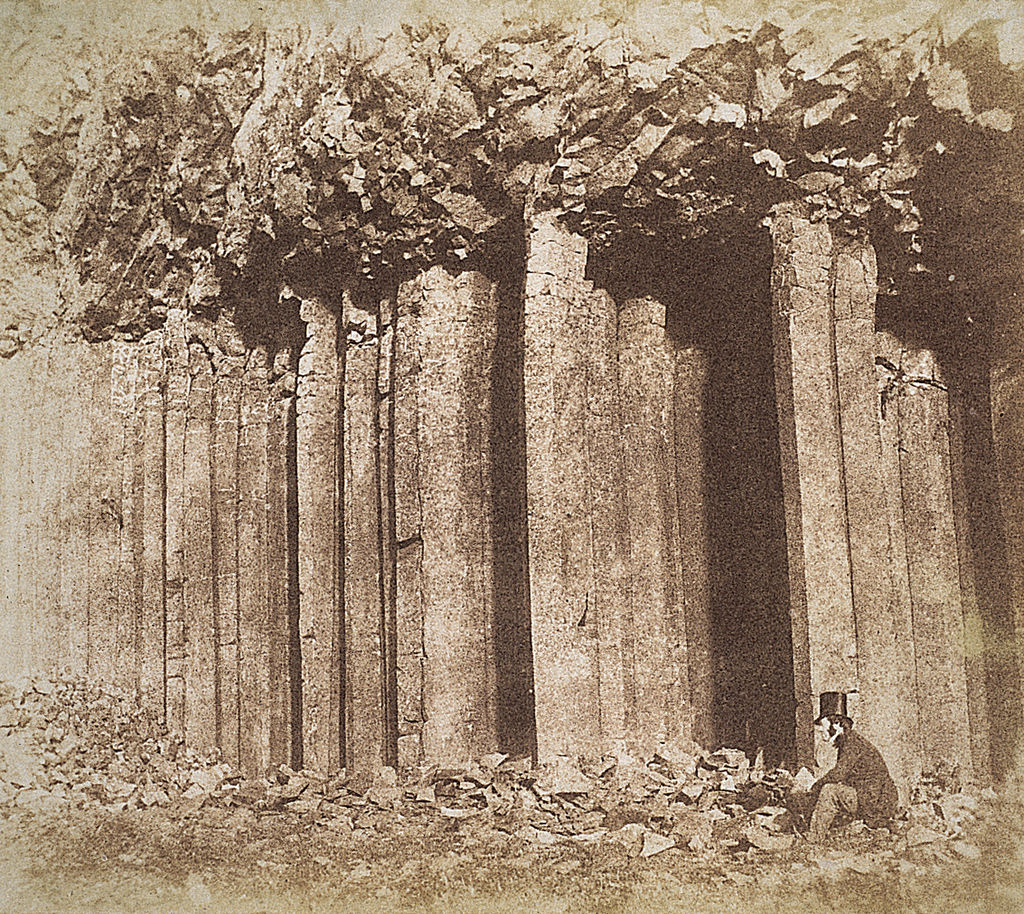
John Muir Wood, Staffa near Fingal's Cave (with seated figure who might be photographer), c. 1850

The Edinburgh Calotype Club (1843 – c.1850s) of Scotland was the first photographic club in the world. Its members consisted of pioneering photographers primarily from Edinburgh and St Andrews. The efforts of the Club's members resulted in the production of two of the world's earliest assembled photographic albums, consisting of more than 300 images.

== Foundation ==
The group was formed after the introduction of calotype photography to Edinburgh gentlemen by David Brewster, then Principal of St Andrews University, and also a close friend of the inventor of the calotype process, Henry Fox Talbot. Talbot sent Brewster examples of his work well before publishing on his findings, and it was Brewster who suggested that Talbot should only patent his invention in England, and not Scotland, which eventually allowed for the club's formation.

Talbot sent Brewster examples of his calotype photography, but Brewster had to turn to a colleague at St Andrews, the Professor of Chemistry Dr John Adamson, in order to discover how to reproduce his friend's process. Although John Adamson was the first person in Scotland to use calotype photography, it was his brother, Robert, who was to take up photography as a passion and a profession, eventually establishing the country's first photographic studio, Hill & Adamson, with painter and pioneering photographer David Octavius Hill.

A visit from James Montgomery, who was studying in Edinburgh to enter the Faculty of Advocates, and a group of friends who were interested in Brewster's and John Adamson's reproduction of the calotype process, allegedly led to the formation of the Edinburgh Calotype Club itself.

== Membership ==
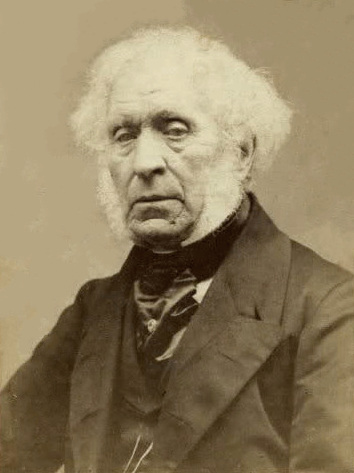
David Brewster (1781-1868), c. 1850s

The membership of the Club was composed of professional gentlemen from a variety of backgrounds - including clerics, academics and physicians - in both Edinburgh and St Andrews. Meetings of the club are described as being generally informal, and retrospective on the Club from an 1874 edition of The British Journal of Photography states that had "neither laws, office-bearers, or formalities of any kind":

"The meetings were held periodically at the houses of the members alternately, and generally each took the form of a breakfast, although when some greater step than ordinary had been made in advance it was generally honoured by being introduced to the members at a formal dinner."

Despite the lack of records, the names of eight members have been traced, and the albums themselves include the names of five members as well as a number of associates.

=== Notable members ===
The club's membership included many notable figures of the time, particularly from Edinburgh and St Andrews, including:

- John Adamson (1810-1870), doctor and chemist in St Andrews
- David Brewster (1781-1868), Scottish physicist, mathematician, astronomer, inventor, and writer
- John Cay (1790-1865), advocate
- Cosmo Innes (1798-1874), Scottish historian and antiquary
- James Calder Macphail (1821-1908), minister
- James Montgomery (1818-1897), advocate and Episcopalian clergyman
- Mark Napier (1798-1879), historian
- Hugh Lyon Playfair (1786-1861), Provost of St Andrews
- Henry Fox Talbot (1800-1877), inventor and pioneer of photography
- George Moir (1800-1870), advocate and author
- Robert Tennent (1813-1890) and his younger brother Hugh Lyon Tennent (1817-1874)

== Dissolution ==
The Edinburgh Calotype Club continued meeting until sometime in the 1850s; although the exact date when it ceased to exist is not known, curators at the National Library of Scotland suggest that it was likely around the mid 1850s, "when the albumen and collodion processes superseded the calotype... The Edinburgh Calotype Club had, in a sense, outlived its usefulness." The development of newer photographic technologies meant that photography was opened to a wider audience, and "spread like wildfire over the country."

Some members of the Club, in particular David Brewster, George Moir and Cosmo Innes, went on to become active in the later Photographic Society of Scotland that was founded in 1856. Brewster became the President of the Photographic Society of Scotland, Moir one of its two vice presidents, and Innes a council member.
