= William Herapath (chemist) =

English analytical chemist and political reformer

William Herapath (1796–1868) was an English analytical chemist and political reformer.

== Life ==
Herapath was born in Bristol, where father was a maltster in St. Philip's parish, and after his death succeeded to the business. He gave it up in order to study chemistry. He was one of the founders of the Chemical Society of London, of which he was a fellow, and also of the Bristol Medical School, of which he became professor of chemistry and toxicology on its opening in 1828.

On 13 April 1835, at the trial of a woman named Burdock for poisoning by arsenic her lodger, Mrs. Clara Ann Smith, at Bristol, Herapath was expert witness for the prosecution, and made a reputation by his analysis. He was then retained in other criminal and civil trials, and was frequently opposed to Alfred Swaine Taylor. In the case of William Palmer of Rugeley in 1856, when he was a witness for the defence, he was severely handled by Alexander Cockburn, who denounced him as a "thoroughgoing partisan".

His other famous cases include an alleged case of infanticide in Bath by a Bristol lawyer and his mistress, known by the pseudonyms Mr & Mrs Slater.

In politics Herapath was a radical at the time of the Great Reform Bill. He was president of the Bristol Political Union, and acted against the rioting of October 1831. On the passing of the Municipal Reform Act, he became a member of the town council, and then a justice of the peace. His radicalism faded, and he lost his seat on the council.

Herapath died on 13 February 1868.

== Works ==
Herapath wrote "instructions" for Clifton Cleve's Hints on Domestic Sanitation, London, 1848; and A Few Words on the Bristol and Clifton Hot-wells. Together with an Analysis of the Spa, Bristol (1854?), which was later part of the Handbook for Visitors to the Bristol and Clifton Hotwells, Bristol (1865?).

== Family ==
William Bird Herapath the toxicologist was his eldest son. The celebrated English physicist John Herapath (30 May 1790 – 24 February 1868) was his cousin.

== Notes ==
Attribution

This article incorporates text from a publication now in the public domain: Stephen, Leslie; Lee, Sidney, eds. (1891). "Herapath, William". Dictionary of National Biography. Vol. 26. London: Smith, Elder & Co.
