= William Bird Herapath =

English surgeon and chemist

Dr William Bird Herapath FRS FRSE FRCS (28 February 1820 – 12 October 1868) was an English surgeon and chemist known for his discovery of Herapathite.

== Life ==
Herapath was born in Bristol, the eldest son of William Herapath, Professor of Chemistry at Bristol Medical School, and educated at London University, where he was awarded M.B. in 1844. By 1845 he was working as a surgeon-accoucheur at the Bristol Dispensary.

He was awarded M.D. in 1851, and by 1852 was surgeon to St Peter's Hospital, The Red Maids' School and Queen Elizabeth's Hospital, Bristol. He published many articles in medical, chemical, and other scientific journals and was vice-president of the Bristol Microscopical Society.

In 1852, after one of his pupils (Mr. W. H. Phelps), was attracted by some peculiarly brilliant emerald-green crystals that he noticed in a bottle. Herapath found that he could create these crystals by dropping tincture of iodine into a solution of quinine disulphate in diluted sulphuric acid. By studying these crystals under a microscope he found that they polarized light very strongly. He described it as artificial tourmaline, a semi-precious gem and it later became known as Herapathite. He went on to develop new analytical techniques for the detection and analysis of alkaloid compounds based on the optical and chemical characteristics of their iodo-sulphates. He also designed a new combustion blowpipe for organic analyses and developed spectroscopic techniques for detecting traces of blood.

In 1854 he was elected a Fellow of the Royal Society of Edinburgh, his proposer being Philip Kelland.

In 1859 he was elected a Fellow of the Royal Society. His candidature citation read: "The discoverer of the Optical and Chemical Characters of the sulphate of Iodo-quinine. The author of four papers in the Philosophical Magazine 1st On the Optical Properties & Chemical Characters of the Sulphate of Iodo-quinine (artificial Tourmaline),2nd On the Chemical Analysis of the same remarkable salt - 3rd On the Discovery of Quinine and Quinidine in the Urine of Patients under Treatment, 4th On the Manufacture of large Optical plates of Sulphate of Iodo-quinine. The inventor of a new polarizing medium, as an efficient substitute for the Tourmaline. Distinguished for his acquaintance with the science of Chemistry. Eminent as a Chemist, Physiologist, and Microscopist".

In 1864 he became ill and died in 1868 and was buried in Bristol's Arnos Vale Cemetery.

== Family ==
He married Lucy Kynaston, daughter of Cabot Kynaston of Penally, Pembrokeshire with whom he had a son and five daughters.

== Legacy ==
The embedding of microscopic crystals of herapathite in a clear film was later patented by Edwin H. Land as a polarizing filter, under the name of Polaroid.
