= Polaroid (polarizer) =

Optically active material

Polaroid is a type of synthetic plastic sheet which is used as a polarizer or polarizing filter. A trademark of the Polaroid Corporation, the term has since entered common use.

== Patent ==
The original material, patented in 1929 and further developed in 1932 by Edwin H. Land, consists of many microscopic crystals of iodoquinine sulphate (herapathite) embedded in a transparent nitrocellulose polymer film. The needle-like crystals are aligned during the manufacture of the film by stretching or by applying electric or magnetic fields. With the crystals aligned, the sheet is dichroic: it tends to absorb light which is polarized parallel to the direction of crystal alignment but to transmit light which is polarized perpendicular to it.

The resultant electric field of an electromagnetic wave (such as light) determines its polarization. If the wave interacts with a line of crystals as in a sheet of polaroid, any varying electric field in the direction parallel to the line of the crystals will cause a current to flow along this line. The electrons moving in this current will collide with other particles and re-emit the light backwards and forwards. This will cancel the incident wave causing little or no transmission through the sheet.

The component of the electric field perpendicular to the line of crystals, however, can cause only small movements in the electrons as they cannot move very much from side to side. This means there will be little change in the perpendicular component of the field leading to transmission of the part of the light wave polarized perpendicular to the crystals only, hence allowing the material to be used as a light polarizer.

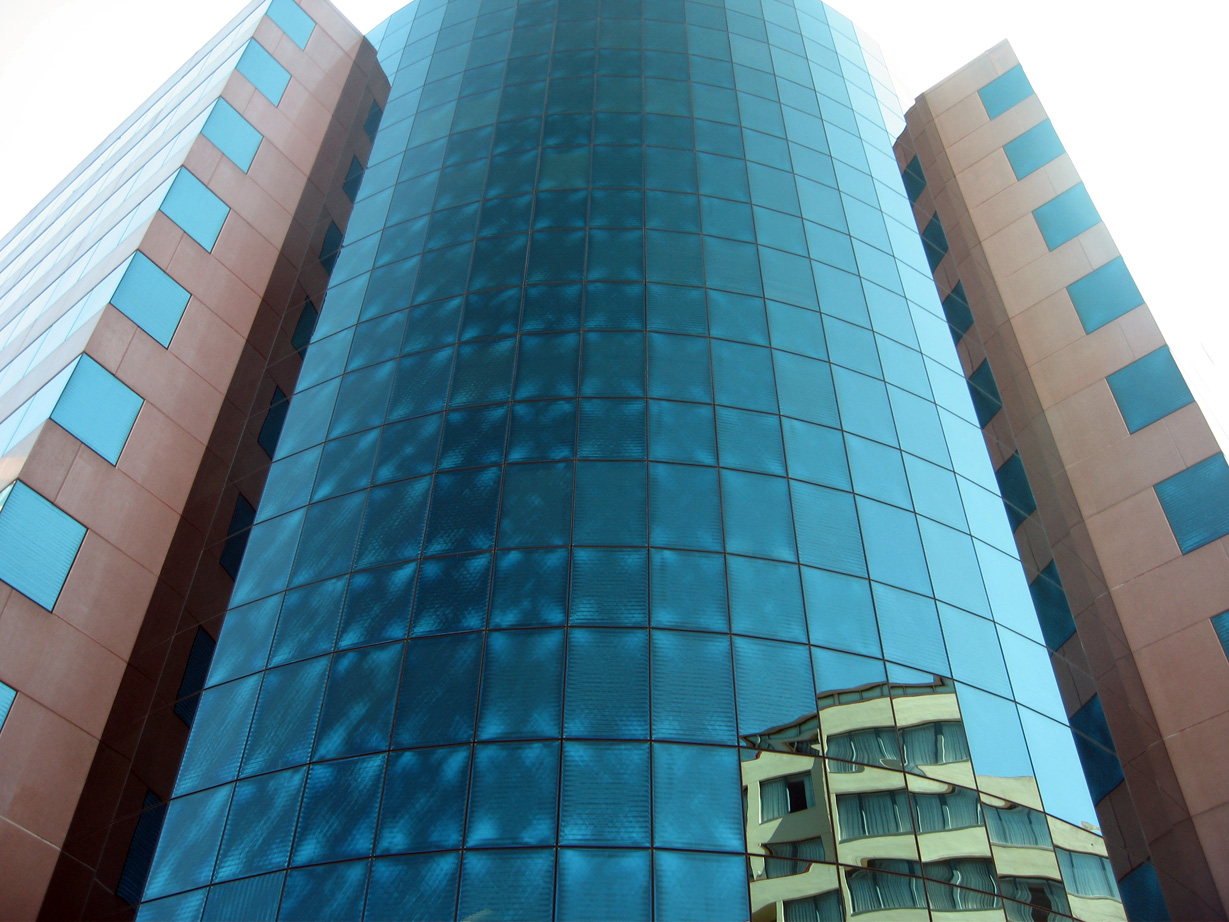
A building seen through polaroid sunglasses

This material, known as J-sheet, was later replaced by the improved H-sheet Polaroid, invented in 1938 by Land. H-sheet is a polyvinyl alcohol (PVA) polymer impregnated with iodine. During manufacture, the PVA polymer chains are stretched such that they form an array of aligned, linear molecules in the material. The iodine dopant attaches to the PVA molecules and makes them conducting along the length of the chains. Light polarized parallel to the chains is absorbed, and light polarized perpendicular to the chains is transmitted.

Another type of Polaroid is the K-sheet polarizer, which consists of aligned polyvinylene chains in a PVA polymer created by dehydrating PVA. This polarizer material is particularly resistant to humidity and heat.

== Applications ==
Polarizing sheets are used in liquid-crystal displays, optical microscopes and sunglasses. Since Polaroid sheet is dichroic, it will absorb impinging light of one plane of polarization, so sunglasses will reduce the partially polarized light reflected from level surfaces such as windows and sheets of water, for example. They are also used to examine for chain orientation in transparent plastic products made from polystyrene or polycarbonate.

The intensity of light passing through a Polaroid polarizer is described by Malus' law.
