= Herapathite =

Names
- IUPAC name (R)-[(2S,4S,5R)-5-ethenyl-1-azabicyclo[2.2.2]octan-2-yl]-(6-methoxyquinolin-4-yl)methanol;sulfuric acid;tetratriiodide

Identifiers
CAS Number	7631-46-1
3D model (JSmol)	Interactive image
ChemSpider	4912094
ECHA InfoCard	100.028.677
EC Number	231-544-9
PubChem CID	6400556
UNII	FG2Z310P5U
- InChI: InChI=1S/3C20H24N2O2.4I3.6H2O4S/c3*1-3-13-12-22-9-7-14(13)10-19(22)20(23)16-6-8-21-18-5-4-15(24-2)11-17(16)18;4*1-3-2;6*1-5(2,3)4/h3*3-6,8,11,13-14,19-20,23H,1,7,9-10,12H2,2H3;;;;;6*(H2,1,2,3,4)/q;;;4*-1;;;;;;/t3*13-,14-,19-,20+;;;;;;;;;;/m000........../s1 Key: RVSIFMMVUGYDOE-RSBHKSPGSA-N
- SMILES: COC1=CC2=C(C=CN=C2C=C1)[C@H]([C@@H]3C[C@@H]4CCN3C[C@@H]4C=C)O.COC1=CC2=C(C=CN=C2C=C1)[C@H]([C@@H]3C[C@@H]4CCN3C[C@@H]4C=C)O.COC1=CC2=C(C=CN=C2C=C1)[C@H]([C@@H]3C[C@@H]4CCN3C[C@@H]4C=C)O.OS(=O)(=O)O.OS(=O)(=O)O.OS(=O)(=O)O.OS(=O)(=O)O.OS(=O)(=O)O.OS(=O)(=O)O.I[I-]I.I[I-]I.I[I-]I.I[I-]I

Properties
Chemical formula	C_{60}H_{84}I_{12}N_{6}O_{30}S_{6}
Molar mass	3084.56 g·mol^{−1}
- Except where otherwise noted, data are given for materials in their standard state (at 25 °C [77 °F], 100 kPa). Infobox references

Herapathite, or iodoquinine sulfate, is a chemical compound whose crystals are dichroic and thus can be used for polarizing light.

Its formation was investigated by 1852 by William Bird Herapath, a Bristol surgeon and chemist, after his pupil (Mr. W. H. Phelps) was attracted by some peculiarly brilliant emerald-green crystals that he noticed in a bottle containing a large quantity of the mixed disulfates of quinine and cinchonine. Herapath found that he could create these crystals by dropping tincture of iodine into a solution of quinine disulfate in diluted sulfuric acid and that, by studying the crystals under a microscope, that they polarized light very strongly. The story that a dog was involved in the discovery can be found in the widely quoted publication^{[2]}. There appears to be no reliable evidence for it other than the article, nearly one hundred years later by E. H. Land.

In the 1930s, Ferdinand Bernauer invented a process to grow single herapathite crystals large enough to be sandwiched between two sheets of glass to create a polarizing filter; these were sold under brand name "Bernotar" by Carl Zeiss. Herapathite can be formed by precipitation by dissolving quinine sulfate in acetic acid and adding iodine tincture.

Herapathite's dichroic properties came to the attention of Sir David Brewster, and were later used by Edwin H. Land in 1929 to construct the first type of Polaroid sheet polarizer. He did this by embedding herapathite crystals in a polymer instead of growing a single large crystal.

Structurally, herapathite consists of quinine (in a cationic doubly-protonated ammonium form), sulfate counterions, and triiodide units, all as a hydrate. They combine as 4C_{20}H_{26}N_{2}O_{2}•3SO_{4}•2I_{3}•6H_{2}O, or sometimes other ratios and higher polyiodides.
