= List of United Kingdom locations: Me-Mic =

The United Kingdom

This is part of the list of United Kingdom locations: a gazetteer of place names in the United Kingdom showing each place's locality and geographical coordinates.

== Me ==
=== Mea–Mee ===
Location	Locality	Coordinates (links to map & photo sources)	OS grid reference
Mead	Cornwall	50.92°N 04.53°W	SS2217
Mead	Devon	50.51°N 03.73°W	SX7770
Mead End	Wiltshire	51.00°N 01.97°W	SU0223
Mead End (Denmead)	Hampshire	50.89°N 01.06°W	SU6611
Mead End (Sway)	Hampshire	50.78°N 01.63°W	SZ2698
Meadgate	Bath and North East Somerset	51.32°N 02.46°W	ST6858
Meadle	Buckinghamshire	51.73°N 00.84°W	SP8005
Meadowbank	Cheshire	53.20°N 02.52°W	SJ6568
Meadowbank	City of Edinburgh	55.95°N 03.15°W	NT2874
Meadowend	Essex	52.03°N 00.53°E	TL7440
Meadowfield	Durham	54.74°N 01.62°W	NZ2439
Meadowfoot	North Ayrshire	55.68°N 04.84°W	NS2147
Meadow Green	Herefordshire	52.20°N 02.42°W	SO7156
Meadowhall	Sheffield	53.42°N 01.41°W	SK3992
Meadow Head	Sheffield	53.33°N 01.49°W	SK3482
Meadowley	Shropshire	52.52°N 02.50°W	SO6692
Meadowmill	East Lothian	55.94°N 02.96°W	NT4073
Meadows	Nottinghamshire	52.93°N 01.15°W	SK5738
Meadowtown	Shropshire	52.60°N 03.02°W	SJ3101
Meads	East Sussex	50.75°N 00.26°E	TV6097
Meadside	Oxfordshire	51.63°N 01.16°W	SU5893
Mead Vale	Surrey	51.22°N 00.19°W	TQ2649
Meadwell	Devon	50.60°N 04.26°W	SX4081
Meaford	Staffordshire	52.91°N 02.17°W	SJ8835
Meagill	North Yorkshire	53.99°N 01.74°W	SE1755
Mealabost / Melbost (Point, Lewis)	Western Isles	58.20°N 06.32°W	NB4632
Mealabost Bhuirgh / Melbost Borve (north Lewis)	Western Isles	58.42°N 06.43°W	NB4157
Mealasta Island	Western Isles	58.07°N 07.12°W	NA979213
Meal Bank	Cumbria	54.34°N 02.70°W	SD5495
Meal Hill	Kirklees	53.55°N 01.74°W	SE1707
Mealista / Mealasta	Western Isles	58.10°N 07.11°W	NA9924
Meall Mòr	Highland	58.29°N 05.20°W	NC120380
Mealrigg	Cumbria	54.79°N 03.37°W	NY1245
Mealsgate	Cumbria	54.76°N 03.24°W	NY2042
Meanwood	Leeds	53.82°N 01.57°W	SE2837
Mearbeck	North Yorkshire	54.03°N 02.29°W	SD8160
Meare	Somerset	51.16°N 02.78°W	ST4541
Meare Green (West Hatch)	Somerset	50.99°N 03.01°W	ST2922
Meare Green (Stoke St Gregory)	Somerset	51.02°N 02.95°W	ST3326
Mearns	Bath and North East Somerset	51.32°N 02.50°W	ST6558
Mearns	East Renfrewshire	55.76°N 04.32°W	NS5455
Mears Ashby	Northamptonshire	52.28°N 00.78°W	SP8366
Measborough Dike	Barnsley	53.54°N 01.45°W	SE3605
Measham	Leicestershire	52.70°N 01.51°W	SK3312
Meath Green	Surrey	51.18°N 00.18°W	TQ2744
Meathop	Cumbria	54.21°N 02.87°W	SD4380
Meaux	East Riding of Yorkshire	53.84°N 00.33°W	TA0939
Meavaig	Western Isles	57.98°N 06.93°W	NB085104
Meaver	Cornwall	50.01°N 05.24°W	SW6818
Meavy	Devon	50.48°N 04.05°W	SX5467
Medbourne	Leicestershire	52.52°N 00.83°W	SP7993
Medburn	Northumberland	55.02°N 01.79°W	NZ1370
Meddon	Devon	50.92°N 04.46°W	SS2717
Meden Vale	Nottinghamshire	53.21°N 01.14°W	SK5769
Medhurst Row	Kent	51.20°N 00.08°E	TQ4647
Medlam	Lincolnshire	53.08°N 00.04°W	TF3156
Medlar	Lancashire	53.80°N 02.89°W	SD4135
Medlicott	Shropshire	52.54°N 02.88°W	SO4094
Medlyn	Cornwall	50.15°N 05.22°W	SW7033
Medmenham	Buckinghamshire	51.54°N 00.84°W	SU8084
Medomsley	Durham	54.88°N 01.83°W	NZ1154
Medstead	Hampshire	51.12°N 01.07°W	SU6537
Meerbrook	Staffordshire	53.13°N 02.01°W	SJ9960
Meer Common	Herefordshire	52.16°N 02.93°W	SO3652
Meer End	Solihull	52.36°N 01.64°W	SP2474
Meerhay	Dorset	50.81°N 02.73°W	ST4802
Meersbrook	Sheffield	53.35°N 01.47°W	SK3584
Meesden	Hertfordshire	51.96°N 00.08°E	TL4332
Meeson	Shropshire	52.77°N 02.52°W	SJ6520
Meeson Heath	Shropshire	52.77°N 02.52°W	SJ6520
Meeth	Devon	50.85°N 04.07°W	SS5408
Meethe	Devon	50.98°N 03.89°W	SS6722
Meethill	Aberdeenshire	57.49°N 01.81°W	NK1145
Meeting Green	Suffolk	52.16°N 00.54°E	TL7455
Meeting House Hill	Norfolk	52.80°N 01.41°E	TG3028

=== Meg–Mel ===
Location	Locality	Coordinates (links to map & photo sources)	OS grid reference
Meidrim	Carmarthenshire	51.85°N 04.49°W	SN2820
Meifod	Powys	52.70°N 03.25°W	SJ1513
Meigle	Perth and Kinross	56.58°N 03.17°W	NO2844
Meigle	North Ayrshire	55.84°N 04.89°W	NS1965
Meikle Earnock	South Lanarkshire	55.75°N 04.05°W	NS7153
Meikle Kilchattan Butts	Argyll and Bute	55.76°N 05.04°W	NS0957
Meikleour	Perth and Kinross	56.53°N 03.38°W	NO1539
Meikle Wartle	Aberdeenshire	57.36°N 02.46°W	NJ7230
Meikle Whitefield	Perth and Kinross	56.49°N 03.34°W	NO1734
Meinciau	Carmarthenshire	51.76°N 04.23°W	SN4610
Meir	City of Stoke-on-Trent	52.97°N 02.10°W	SJ9342
Meir Heath	Staffordshire	52.94°N 02.10°W	SJ9339
Melbourn	Cambridgeshire	52.07°N 00.01°E	TL3844
Melbourne	East Riding of Yorkshire	53.88°N 00.86°W	SE7544
Melbourne	Derbyshire	52.82°N 01.43°W	SK3825
Melbury Abbas	Dorset	50.97°N 02.17°W	ST8820
Melbury Bubb	Dorset	50.85°N 02.58°W	ST5906
Melbury Osmond	Dorset	50.86°N 02.61°W	ST5707
Melbury Sampford	Dorset	50.85°N 02.61°W	ST5706
Melby	Shetland Islands	60.29°N 01.67°W	HU1857
Melchbourne	Bedfordshire	52.27°N 00.50°W	TL0265
Melcombe	Somerset	51.09°N 03.02°W	ST2833
Melcombe Bingham	Dorset	50.81°N 02.34°W	ST7602
Melcombe Regis	Dorset	50.61°N 02.45°W	SY6880
Meldon	Devon	50.70°N 04.05°W	SX5592
Meldon	Northumberland	55.14°N 01.82°W	NZ1183
Meldreth	Cambridgeshire	52.09°N -00.00°E	TL3746
Melfort	Argyll and Bute	56.26°N 05.50°W	NM8314
Meliden	Denbighshire	53.30°N 03.41°W	SJ0680
Melinbyrhedyn	Powys	52.56°N 03.75°W	SN8198
Melin Caiach	Merthyr Tydfil	51.65°N 03.30°W	ST1096
Melincourt	Neath Port Talbot	51.69°N 03.72°W	SN8101
Melincryddan	Neath Port Talbot	51.64°N 03.82°W	SS7496
Melinsey	Cornwall	50.21°N 04.94°W	SW9039
Melin-y-coed	Conwy	53.12°N 03.77°W	SH8160
Melin-y-Wig	Denbighshire	53.02°N 03.44°W	SJ0348
Melkington	Northumberland	55.66°N 02.20°W	NT8741
Melkinthorpe	Cumbria	54.61°N 02.69°W	NY5525
Melkridge	Northumberland	54.97°N 02.42°W	NY7364
Melksham	Wiltshire	51.37°N 02.14°W	ST9064
Melksham Forest	Wiltshire	51.37°N 02.13°W	ST9164
Mellangoose	Cornwall	50.08°N 05.24°W	SW6826
Mell Green	Berkshire	51.49°N 01.35°W	SU4577
Mellguards	Cumbria	54.79°N 02.87°W	NY4445
Melling	Lancashire	54.13°N 02.62°W	SD5971
Melling	Sefton	53.49°N 02.93°W	SD3800
Mellingey	Cornwall	50.50°N 04.93°W	SW9271
Melling Mount	Sefton	53.50°N 02.90°W	SD4001
Mellis	Suffolk	52.32°N 01.06°E	TM0974
Mellis Green	Suffolk	52.32°N 01.06°E	TM0974
Mellon Charles	Highland	57.85°N 05.64°W	NG8491
Mellon Udrigle	Highland	57.89°N 05.57°W	NG8895
Mellor	Lancashire	53.76°N 02.53°W	SD6530
Mellor	Stockport	53.38°N 02.04°W	SJ9788
Mellor Brook	Lancashire	53.77°N 02.54°W	SD6431
Mells	Somerset	51.23°N 02.40°W	ST7249
Mells	Suffolk	52.32°N 01.52°E	TM4076
Mells Green	Somerset	51.23°N 02.40°W	ST7248
Melmerby	Cumbria	54.72°N 02.60°W	NY6137
Melmerby (Richmondshire)	North Yorkshire	54.26°N 01.89°W	SE0785
Melmerby (Harrogate)	North Yorkshire	54.17°N 01.49°W	SE3376
Melon Green	Suffolk	52.18°N 00.69°E	TL8457
Melplash	Dorset	50.77°N 02.73°W	SY4898
Melrose	Scottish Borders	55.59°N 02.73°W	NT5434
Melsonby	North Yorkshire	54.46°N 01.70°W	NZ1908
Meltham	Kirklees	53.58°N 01.86°W	SE0910
Meltham Mills	Kirklees	53.58°N 01.85°W	SE1010
Melton	Suffolk	52.10°N 01.32°E	TM2850
Melton	East Riding of Yorkshire	53.72°N 00.53°W	SE9726
Meltonby	East Riding of Yorkshire	53.95°N 00.79°W	SE7952
Melton Constable	Norfolk	52.85°N 01.02°E	TG0433
Melton Mowbray	Leicestershire	52.76°N 00.88°W	SK7519
Melton Ross	North Lincolnshire	53.57°N 00.38°W	TA0710
Melvaig	Highland	57.80°N 05.80°W	NG7486
Melverley	Shropshire	52.73°N 02.99°W	SJ3316
Melverley Green	Shropshire	52.74°N 03.00°W	SJ3217
Melvich	Highland	58.55°N 03.92°W	NC8864

=== Mem–Mep ===
Location	Locality	Coordinates (links to map & photo sources)	OS grid reference
Membland	Devon	50.31°N 04.02°W	SX5648
Membury	Devon	50.82°N 03.03°W	ST2703
Memsie	Aberdeenshire	57.64°N 02.05°W	NJ9762
Memus	Angus	56.71°N 02.94°W	NO4259
Mena	Cornwall	50.42°N 04.76°W	SX0462
Menadarva	Cornwall	50.22°N 05.35°W	SW6141
Menagissey	Cornwall	50.26°N 05.21°W	SW7146
Menai Bridge	Isle of Anglesey	53.22°N 04.17°W	SH5572
Mendham	Suffolk	52.38°N 01.33°E	TM2782
Mendlesham	Suffolk	52.24°N 01.07°E	TM1065
Mendlesham Green	Suffolk	52.22°N 01.05°E	TM0963
Menethorpe	North Yorkshire	54.09°N 00.83°W	SE7667
Mengham	Hampshire	50.78°N 00.97°W	SZ7299
Menheniot	Cornwall	50.43°N 04.42°W	SX2862
Menherion	Cornwall	50.17°N 05.22°W	SW7036
Menithwood	Worcestershire	52.31°N 02.44°W	SO7069
Menna	Cornwall	50.34°N 04.93°W	SW9154
Mennock	Dumfries and Galloway	55.35°N 03.89°W	NS8008
Menston	Bradford	53.88°N 01.74°W	SE1743
Menstrie	Stirling	56.14°N 03.86°W	NS8496
Menthorpe	North Yorkshire	53.80°N 00.93°W	SE7034
Mentmore	Buckinghamshire	51.86°N 00.69°W	SP9019
Menzion	Scottish Borders	55.49°N 03.44°W	NT0923
Meoble	Highland	56.92°N 05.63°W	NM7987
Meole Brace	Shropshire	52.68°N 02.77°W	SJ4810
Meols	Wirral	53.39°N 03.17°W	SJ2289
Meon	Hampshire	50.82°N 01.24°W	SU5303
Meon Park	Hampshire	50.89°N 01.19°W	SU5711
Meonstoke	Hampshire	50.96°N 01.13°W	SU6119
Meopham	Kent	51.36°N 00.35°E	TQ6465
Meopham Green	Kent	51.36°N 00.34°E	TQ6365
Meopham Station	Kent	51.37°N 00.34°E	TQ6367
Mepal	Cambridgeshire	52.39°N 00.11°E	TL4480
Meppershall	Bedfordshire	52.01°N 00.35°W	TL1336

=== Mer–Mez ===
Location	Locality	Coordinates (links to map & photo sources)	OS grid reference
Merbach	Herefordshire	52.09°N 03.02°W	SO3045
Mercaston	Derbyshire	52.98°N 01.61°W	SK2643
Merchant Fields	Kirklees	53.73°N 01.71°W	SE1926
Merchiston	City of Edinburgh	55.93°N 03.21°W	NT2472
Mere	Wiltshire	51.08°N 02.27°W	ST8132
Mere	Cheshire	53.32°N 02.42°W	SJ7281
Mere Brow	Lancashire	53.65°N 02.89°W	SD4118
Mereclough	Lancashire	53.76°N 02.19°W	SD8730
Mere Green	Birmingham	52.58°N 01.83°W	SP1199
Mere Green	Worcestershire	52.25°N 02.07°W	SO9562
Merehead	Wrexham	52.93°N 02.81°W	SJ4538
Mere Heath	Cheshire	53.22°N 02.51°W	SJ6670
Meresborough	Kent	51.34°N 00.61°E	TQ8264
Mereside	Lancashire	53.79°N 03.00°W	SD3434
Meretown	Staffordshire	52.78°N 02.363°W	SJ7520
Mereworth	Kent	51.25°N 00.37°E	TQ6653
Meriden	Solihull	52.43°N 01.64°W	SP2482
Meriden	Hertfordshire	51.67°N 00.39°W	TQ1199
Merkadale	Highland	57.29°N 06.35°W	NG3831
Merkinch	Highland	57.48°N 04.25°W	NH6546
Merkland	North Ayrshire	55.60°N 05.14°W	NS0239
Merle Common	Surrey	51.22°N -00.00°E	TQ4049
Merley	Poole	50.78°N 01.97°W	SZ0298
Merlin's Bridge	Pembrokeshire	51.78°N 04.98°W	SM9414
Merlin's Cross	Pembrokeshire	51.66°N 04.90°W	SM9900
Merridale	Wolverhampton	52.58°N 02.16°W	SO8998
Merridge	Somerset	51.09°N 03.14°W	ST2034
Merrie Gardens	Isle of Wight	50.64°N 01.18°W	SZ5883
Merrifield	Cornwall	50.78°N 04.46°W	SS2601
Merrifield	Devon	50.31°N 03.67°W	SX8147
Merrington	Shropshire	52.77°N 02.78°W	SJ4720
Merrion	Pembrokeshire	51.63°N 04.99°W	SR9397
Merriott	Somerset	50.90°N 02.79°W	ST4412
Merriott	Dorset	50.75°N 02.69°W	SY5195
Merriottsford	Somerset	50.90°N 02.79°W	ST4412
Merritown	Dorset	50.77°N 01.84°W	SZ1197
Merrivale	Devon	50.55°N 04.06°W	SX5475
Merrivale	Herefordshire	51.90°N 02.58°W	SO6023
Merrow	Surrey	51.24°N 00.55°W	TQ0150
Merrybent	Darlington	54.52°N 01.63°W	NZ2414
Merry Field Hill	Dorset	50.80°N 01.97°W	SU0201
Merry Hill	Wolverhampton	52.57°N 02.17°W	SO8897
Merry Hill	Hertfordshire	51.63°N 00.36°W	TQ1394
Merryhill Green	Berkshire	51.43°N 00.87°W	SU7871
Merrylee	East Renfrewshire	55.80°N 04.29°W	NS5659
Merry Lees	Leicestershire	52.64°N 01.30°W	SK4705
Merrymeet	Cornwall	50.45°N 04.43°W	SX2765
Merry Meeting	Cornwall	50.52°N 04.71°W	SX0873
Merry Oak	City of Southampton	50.90°N 01.37°W	SU4412
Mersea Island	Essex	51.79°N 00.94°E	TM034149
Mersham	Kent	51.11°N 00.92°E	TR0539
Merstham	Surrey	51.26°N 00.15°W	TQ2953
Merston	West Sussex	50.81°N 00.73°W	SU8902
Merstone	Isle of Wight	50.66°N 01.26°W	SZ5285
Merther	Cornwall	50.25°N 05.00°W	SW8644
Merther Lane	Cornwall	50.23°N 05.01°W	SW8542
Merthyr	Carmarthenshire	51.85°N 04.39°W	SN3520
Merthyr Cynog	Powys	52.02°N 03.48°W	SN9837
Merthyr Dyfan	The Vale Of Glamorgan	51.41°N 03.28°W	ST1169
Merthyr Mawr	Bridgend	51.48°N 03.61°W	SS8877
Merthyr Tydfil	Merthyr Tydfil	51.74°N 03.37°W	SO0506
Merthyr Vale	Merthyr Tydfil	51.68°N 03.34°W	ST0799
Merton	Devon	50.88°N 04.10°W	SS5212
Merton	Norfolk	52.54°N 00.80°E	TL9098
Merton	Oxfordshire	51.84°N 01.17°W	SP5717
Merton	London Borough of Merton	51.40°N 00.20°W	TQ2569
Merton Park	Merton	51.40°N 00.20°W	TQ2569
Meshaw	Devon	50.95°N 03.78°W	SS7519
Messing	Essex	51.82°N 00.74°E	TL8918
Messingham	North Lincolnshire	53.52°N 00.65°W	SE8904
Mesty Croft	Sandwell	52.54°N 02.01°W	SO9994
Mesur-y-dorth	Pembrokeshire	51.92°N 05.15°W	SM8330
Metal Bridge	Durham	54.70°N 01.55°W	NZ2934
Metcombe	Devon	50.72°N 03.31°W	SY0792
Metfield	Suffolk	52.37°N 01.36°E	TM2980
Metham	East Riding of Yorkshire	53.72°N 00.77°W	SE8025
Metherell	Cornwall	50.49°N 04.25°W	SX4069
Metheringham	Lincolnshire	53.13°N 00.41°W	TF0661
Methersgate	Suffolk	52.06°N 01.32°E	TM2846
Methil	Fife	56.17°N 03.03°W	NT3699
Methilhill	Fife	56.17°N 03.04°W	NT3599
Methley	Leeds	53.72°N 01.41°W	SE3926
Methley Junction	Leeds	53.72°N 01.41°W	SE3925
Methley Lanes	Wakefield	53.72°N 01.44°W	SE3725
Methlick	Aberdeenshire	57.42°N 02.25°W	NJ8537
Methven	Perth and Kinross	56.41°N 03.59°W	NO0226
Methwold	Norfolk	52.51°N 00.54°E	TL7394
Methwold Hythe	Norfolk	52.51°N 00.51°E	TL7194
Mettingham	Suffolk	52.44°N 01.47°E	TM3689
Metton	Norfolk	52.88°N 01.25°E	TG1937
Mevagissey	Cornwall	50.27°N 04.79°W	SX0145
Mewith Head	North Yorkshire	54.08°N 02.46°W	SD7066
Mexborough	Doncaster	53.49°N 01.29°W	SE4700
Meyrick Park	Bournemouth	50.72°N 01.88°W	SZ0892
Meysey Hampton	Gloucestershire	51.68°N 01.84°W	SU1199

== Mi ==
=== Mia-Mic ===
Location	Locality	Coordinates (links to map & photo sources)	OS grid reference
Miabhaig / Meavag (Loch Ceann Dibig, Harris)	Western Isles	57.86°N 06.80°W	NG1596
Miabhaig / Meavaig (North Harris)	Western Isles	57.94°N 06.92°W	NB0906
Mial	Highland	57.72°N 05.71°W	NG7977
Miavaig	Western Isles	58.19°N 06.97°W	NB0834
Michaelchurch (Tretire with Michaelchurch)	Herefordshire	51.92°N 02.69°W	SO5225
Michaelchurch Escley	Herefordshire	52.00°N 03.00°W	SO3134
Michaelchurch-on-Arrow	Powys	52.14°N 03.11°W	SO2450
Michaelston-le-Pit	The Vale Of Glamorgan	51.44°N 03.22°W	ST1572
Michaelston-super-Ely	Cardiff	51.47°N 03.28°W	ST1176
Michaelston-y-Fedw	City of Newport	51.54°N 03.09°W	ST2484
Michaelstow	Cornwall	50.57°N 04.71°W	SX0878
Michelcombe	Devon	50.49°N 03.84°W	SX6968
Micheldever	Hampshire	51.14°N 01.27°W	SU5139
Michelmersh	Hampshire	51.03°N 01.51°W	SU3426
Mickfield	Suffolk	52.20°N 01.11°E	TM1361
Micklebring	Doncaster	53.44°N 01.23°W	SK5194
Mickleby	North Yorkshire	54.49°N 00.76°W	NZ8012
Micklefield	Buckinghamshire	51.62°N 00.73°W	SU8892
Micklefield	Leeds	53.79°N 01.33°W	SE4433
Micklefield Green	Hertfordshire	51.67°N 00.49°W	TQ0498
Mickleham	Surrey	51.26°N 00.32°W	TQ1753
Micklehurst	Tameside	53.51°N 02.03°W	SD9802
Mickleover	Derbyshire	52.90°N 01.55°W	SK3034
Micklethwaite	Cumbria	54.84°N 03.12°W	NY2850
Micklethwaite	Bradford	53.86°N 01.84°W	SE1041
Mickleton	Gloucestershire	52.08°N 01.76°W	SP1643
Mickleton	Durham	54.60°N 02.06°W	NY9623
Mickletown	Leeds	53.73°N 01.41°W	SE3927
Mickle Trafford	Cheshire	53.21°N 02.84°W	SJ4469
Mickley	North Yorkshire	54.17°N 01.61°W	SE2576
Mickley	Derbyshire	53.30°N 01.52°W	SK3279
Mickley	Shropshire	52.88°N 02.58°W	SJ6132
Mickley Green	Suffolk	52.18°N 00.69°E	TL8457
Mickley Square	Northumberland	54.95°N 01.89°W	NZ0762
