= Barron (surname) =

Barron is a surname of Scottish origin. Notable people with the surname include:

- Alex Barron (disambiguation)
- Andrew Barron (disambiguation)
- Baynes Barron (1917–1982), American film and television actor
- Blue Barron (1913–2005), American orchestra leader
- Brian Barron (1940–2009), British BBC foreign and war correspondent
- Carl Barron (born 1964), Australian comedian
- Carlos Barron (politician) (born 1985), American politician from Colorado
- Charles Barron (born 1950), American politician
- Christopher R. Barron, member of the board of directors and co-founder of GOProud
- Clarence W. Barron (1855–1928), owner and president of Dow Jones & Company
- Clarke Charles Netterville Barron, Chief Reporter of Parliamentary Debates (Hansard) for the New Zealand Parliament for 29 years from 1867
- Colin Fraser Barron (1893–1958), Canadian recipient of the Victoria Cross
- Connor Barron (born 2002), Scottish footballer
- Dana Barron (born 1968), American actor
- Diane Barron, former British ballroom dancer
- Doug Barron (footballer), Scottish footballer
- Earl Barron (born 1981), American professional basketball player
- Edward Hugh Barron, Australian soldier and pioneer
- Elizabeth Cervantes Barron, American politician
- Eric J. Barron, president of Florida State University
- Fraser Barron, (1921–1944) RNZAF bomber pilot during World War II
- Fred Barron (fl. 1898–1911), English footballer
- George Charleton Barron, (c. 1846–1891), British actor
- George Ward Barron, (1883–1961) English footballer
- Gladys Barron (1884–1967), British artist
- Hal V. Barron (born 1962), American biotechnologist
- Harry Barron (1847–1921), Governor of Tasmania (1909–13)
- Herman Barron (1909–1978), American professional golfer
- Jackie Barron, New Zealand sports administrator and school principal
- Jack Barron (1919–1999), Hollywood Make-up artist
- Jahdae Barron (born 2001), American football player
- James Barron (disambiguation), multiple people
- Jeff Barron (1908–1966), New Zealand lawn bowler
- Jerome A. Barron, American professor of law
- Jim Barron (born 1943), English footballer
- John Barron (disambiguation)
- John Shepherd-Barron (1925–2010), Scottish inventor
- Julia Tarrant Barron (1805–1890), founder of Judson College and Howard College
- Justin Barron (born 2001), Canadian ice hockey player
- Justin Barron (American football) (born 2001), American football player
- Keith Barron (1936–2017), English actor and television presenter
- Kenny Barron (born 1943), American jazz pianist
- Kevin Barron (born 1946), British Labour Party politician
- Laird Barron (born 1970), American author
- Louis and Bebe Barron, American pioneers in electronic music
- Mark Barron, American football player
- Matt Barron (born 1986), professional Rugby League player
- Michael Barron (born 1974), English footballer
- Morgan Barron (born 1998), Canadian ice hockey player
- Nicholas Shepherd-Barron, British mathematician
- Nola Barron (born 1931), New Zealand potter
- Norman Barron (1899–1987), Australian rules footballer
- Paul Barron (born 1953), English football goalkeeper
- Richard Barron, Canadian translator
- Robert Barron (born 1959), Roman Catholic bishop
- Robert Barron (minister) (1596–1639) prominent Scottish clergyman
- Samuel Barron (disambiguation)
- Scott Barron (born 1985), English professional footballer
- Sid Barron (1917–2006), Canadian editorial cartoonist
- Stephanie Barron, American novelist
- Sylura Barron (1900–1997), African-American political activist
- T. A. Barron (born 1952), American author of children's fantasy literature
- Tony Barron (born 1966), American Major League baseball player
- Valentina Barron (born 1993), Australian film actress
- William N. Barron (1859–1935), American lawyer
- William Wallace Barron (1911–2002), American politician

== See also ==
- Bishop Barron (disambiguation)
- Senator Barron (disambiguation)
- Baron (name)
