= Bingley (disambiguation) =

Bingley is a town in West Yorkshire, England, near Bradford.

Bingley may also refer to:

== Places ==
- Bingley (ward), an electoral division based on Bingley
- Bingley, Alberta, a locality in Canada

== People ==
- Bingley (surname)
- Baron Bingley
  - Robert Benson, 1st Baron Bingley (1676–1731)
  - George Fox-Lane, 1st Baron Bingley (1697–1773)
  - George Lane-Fox, 1st Baron Bingley (1871–1947)

== Fictional characters ==
- Charles Bingley, a character in the novel Pride and Prejudice
- Caroline Bingley, a character in the novel Pride and Prejudice

== Other uses ==
- Bingley Grammar School
- Bingley railway station

== See also ==
- Bingley Hall, Birmingham, England
- The Bingley Arms, pub in Leeds, England
