= Micklethwaite =

Micklethwaite may refer to:

- Micklethwaite (surname), several people
- Micklethwaite, Cumbria, England
- Micklethwaite, Bradford a village in Bingley Ward, Bradford, West Yorkshire, England
- Micklethwaite, Wetherby, a community in the City of Leeds, England
