= James Baron (disambiguation) =

James Baron (born 1973) is an American football player

James Baron may also refer to:

- Jim Baron (born 1954), American college basketball coach
- Jimmy Baron (born 1961), American radio disc jockey
- Jimmy Baron (basketball) (born 1986), American basketball player
- James N. Baron, American sociologist

== See also ==
- James Barron (disambiguation)
- James Barroun (died 1569), Scottish merchant
