= James Barron (disambiguation) =

James Barron (1769–1851) was an officer in the U.S. Navy.

James Barron may also refer to:

- James Barron (cricketer) (1900–1990), New Zealand cricketer
- James Barron (harbour engineer) (1842–1929), Scottish harbour designer
- James Barron (journalist) (born 1955), reporter for The New York Times
- James Barron (rugby union), English international rugby union player
- Jim Barron (footballer, born 1913) (1913–1969), English footballer
- Jim Barron (footballer, born 1943) (born 1943), English footballer
- James Smith Barron (1875–1941), American lawyer and politician, member of the Virginia Senate
- Jamie Barron (born 1993), Irish hurler

== See also ==
- James Baron (disambiguation)
- James Barroun (died 1569), Scottish merchant
