= Melincourt =

Melincourt could refer to:

- Melincourt, Haute-Saône, a French commune
- Melincourt, Neath Port Talbot, a location in the community of Clyne and Melincourt, South Wales
  - Melincourt Falls, a waterfall and nature reserve
- Melincourt (novel), a novel by Thomas Love Peacock
