= Doug Barron =

Doug Barron may refer to:

- Doug Barron (footballer), Scottish footballer and actor
- Doug Barron (golfer), American golfer
