= Merry Hill =

Merry Hill may refer to:

- Merry Hill, Wolverhampton, a suburb of Wolverhampton, West Midlands
- Merry Hill Shopping Centre, near Brierley Hill, West Midlands
- Merry Hill (New York), an elevation in Herkimer County, New York.
- Merry Hill, North Carolina, a town of Bertie County
- Merry Hill, Hertfordshire, England, a 76 hectare woodland managed by the Woodland Trust
