= Robert Dyce =

Scottish surgeon and professor (1798–1869)

Robert Dyce FRSE (1798–1869) was a Scottish surgeon and Professor of Midwifery at the University of Aberdeen.

== Life ==
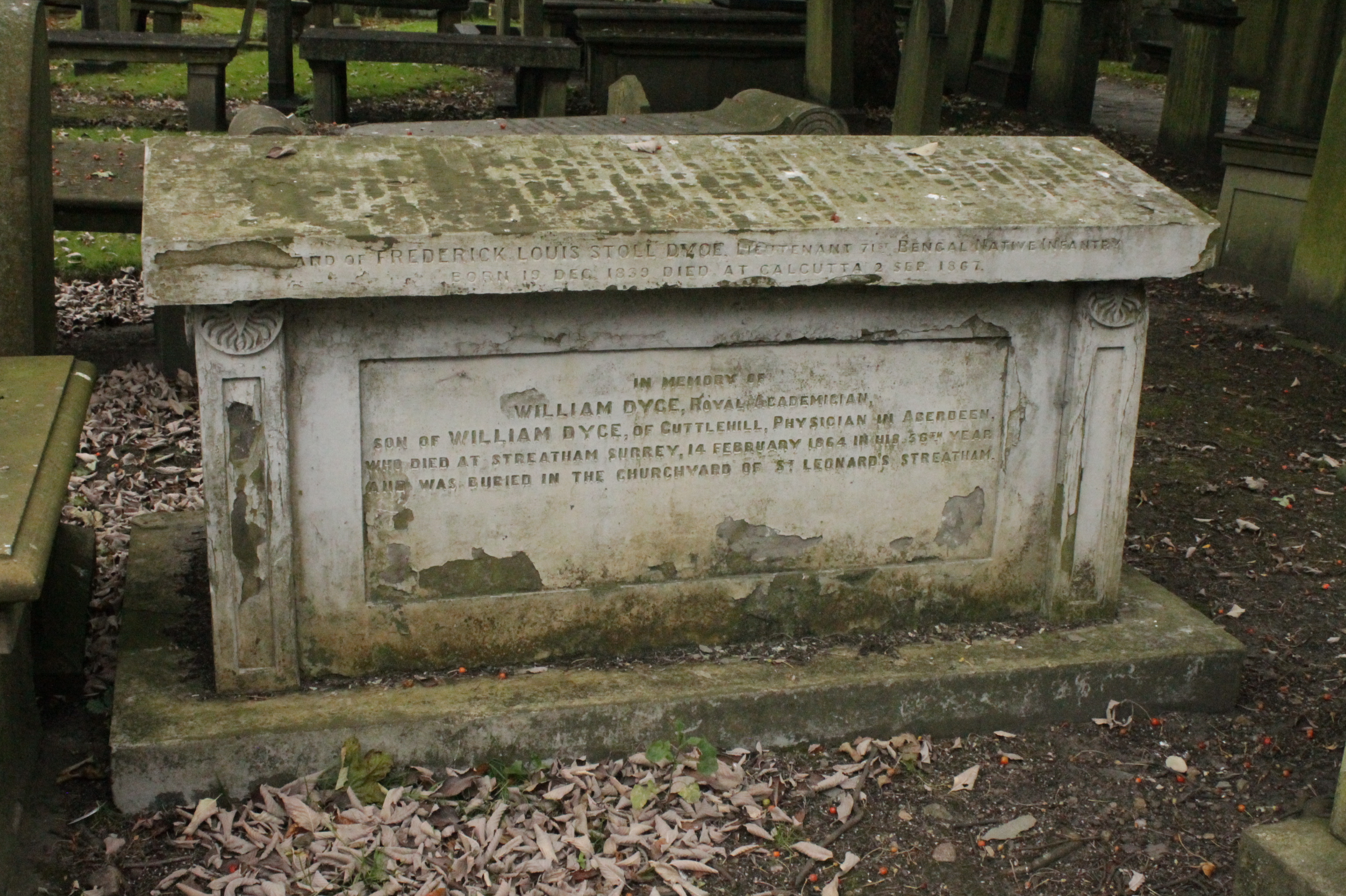
The Dyce grave, Kirk of St Nicholas, Aberdeen

Dyce was born in Aberdeen on 30 November 1798. He is the son of Dr William Dyce of Fonthill and Cuttlehill FRSE (1770–1835) and his wife Margaret Chalmers Dyce (1776–1856). His early years were spent at 48 Marischal Street. His younger brother was the artist William Dyce, and his paternal uncle was General Alexander Dyce of the East India Company.

He studied medicine at the University of Aberdeen with additional studies in both Edinburgh and London. He enlisted in the army at the Military Hospital at Chatham and joined the medical staff in Mauritius in 1821, also serving in the Cape of Good Hope until 1833. From 1833 to 1836 he worked in a military hospital at Maidstone in Kent. In 1836 he returned to Aberdeen as a GP, also lecturing in midwifery at the university from 1841. From 1860 until death he served as Professor of Midwifery at the University of Aberdeen. In 1864 he was elected a Fellow of the Royal Society of Edinburgh, his proposer being Cosmo Innes.

In later life, he lived at 16 Union Terrace in Aberdeen.

He died in Edinburgh on 11 January 1869. He is buried with his parents in the churchyard of the Kirk of St Nicholas on Union Street in Aberdeen.

== Family ==
His nephew (sister's son) was the engineer William Dyce Cay.
