= James Barron (rugby union) =

English rugby union player

- Full name: James Henry Barron
- Born: 28 August 1874 Micklethwaite, England
- Died: 2 December 1942 (aged 68) Bingley, England

Rugby union career
- Position: Forward
International career
Years	Team	Apps	(Points)
1896–97	England	3	(0)

James Henry Barron (28 August 1874 – 2 December 1942) was an English international rugby union player.

Born in Micklethwaite near Bradford, Barron was a forward and spent his rugby career in Yorkshire, starting out with Bingley as a teenager. He later played for Bradford.

Barron was a Yorkshire representative player and gained three England caps.

A knee injury, suffered in an international at Lansdowne Road, contributed to his retirement.

== See also ==
- List of England national rugby union players
