= Andrew Barron =

Andrew Barron may refer to:

- Andrew Barron (cricketer) (1881–1915), New Zealand cricketer
- Andrew Barron (footballer) (born 1980), New Zealand association football player
- Andrew Barron (speed skater) (born 1951), Canadian ice speed skater
- Andrew R. Barron (chemist) (born 1962), British chemist, academic, and entrepreneur
- Andrew R. Barron (statistician), American statistician and information theorist
