= Auchmithie =

Coordinates: 56.589517°N 2.522639°W

Auchmithie: Scottish Gaelic: Achadh Muthaich
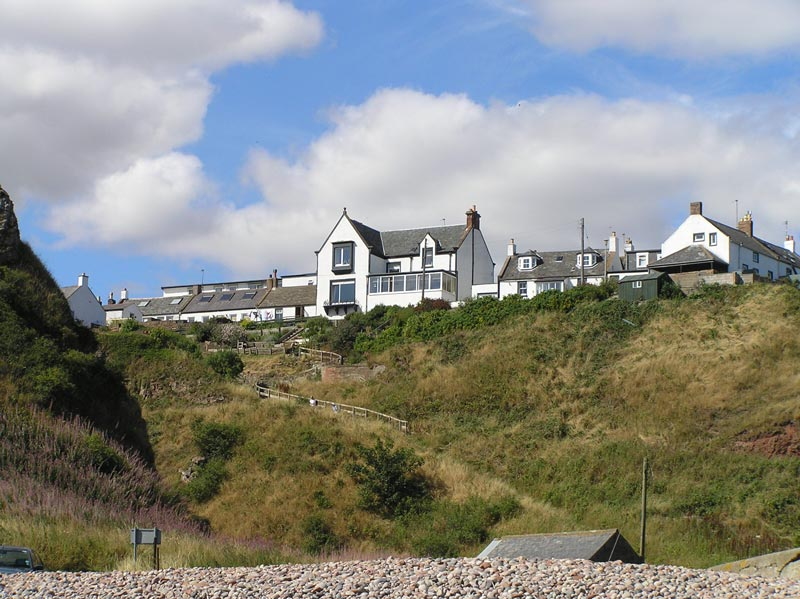
- Auchmithie, viewed from the beach

- Location within Angus
- Population: 183
- OS grid reference: NO680443
- Council area: Angus
- Lieutenancy area: Angus
- Country: Scotland
- Sovereign state: United Kingdom
- Post town: ARBROATH
- Postcode district: DD11
- Dialling code: 01241
- Police: Scotland
- Fire: Scottish
- Ambulance: Scottish
- UK Parliament: Angus
- Scottish Parliament: Angus South

Auchmithie (Scots pronunciation: [ɑxˈmɪθe]; Scottish Gaelic: Achadh Muthaich, meaning "cowherd's farm") is a small fishing village in Angus, Scotland, three miles north east of the town of Arbroath. It sits atop a cliff of red sandstone conglomerate of Devonian date, approximately 120 feet above a shingle beach. Among the pebbles on the beach, derived from those weathered out of the cliffs (themselves derived from pebbles deposited by a massive ancient river-delta), a significant percentage are jasper, predominantly dark red, with rarer examples green or yellow.

In the dilapidated harbour, which began construction in 1889 and was designed by James Barron, there are still some small fishing boats.

The Arbroath smokie (haddock hot smoked in a particular way) is said to have originated in Auchmithie. Local legend has it a store caught fire one night, destroying barrels of haddock preserved in salt. The following morning, the people found some of the barrels had caught fire, cooking the haddock inside. Inspection revealed the haddock to be quite tasty.

Sir Walter Scott stayed in the Waverley Hotel in Auchmithie and described Auchmithie in his novel The Antiquary (1816), under the name 'Musslecrag'.

== Bus Services ==
From Auchmithie, Travel Wisharts (Note: Also known as: Wisharts Froickheim, and Wisharts G & N Ltd) operate services 35 and 140 daily. Both serve Arbroath bus station, but service 140 continues to Friockheim & Stracathro via Brechin on most journeys. The company's bus depot is in Friockheim. Once a night between Monday & Saturday, Stagecoach Strathtay also serve the village with their service 44 to Arbroath bus station.

== Gallery ==
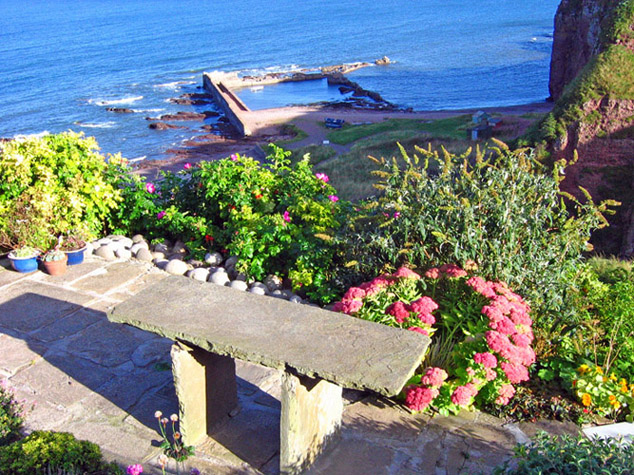
Auchmithie harbour

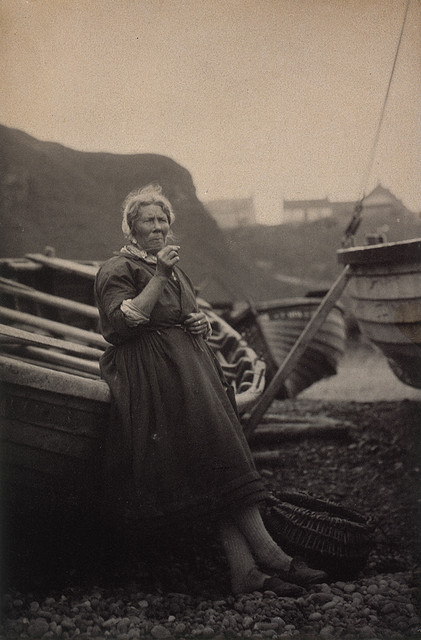
Auchmithie, 1881, photograph by James Cox

== Fishing ==
The statistics gathered by the Fishery Board show the decline of Auchmithie as a fishing port in the years before the First World War. In 1913 they wrote "Large falling off of catch. The codling and plaice net fishing were unsuccessful. Gradually getting less important as a fishing station".

Fishery Statistics

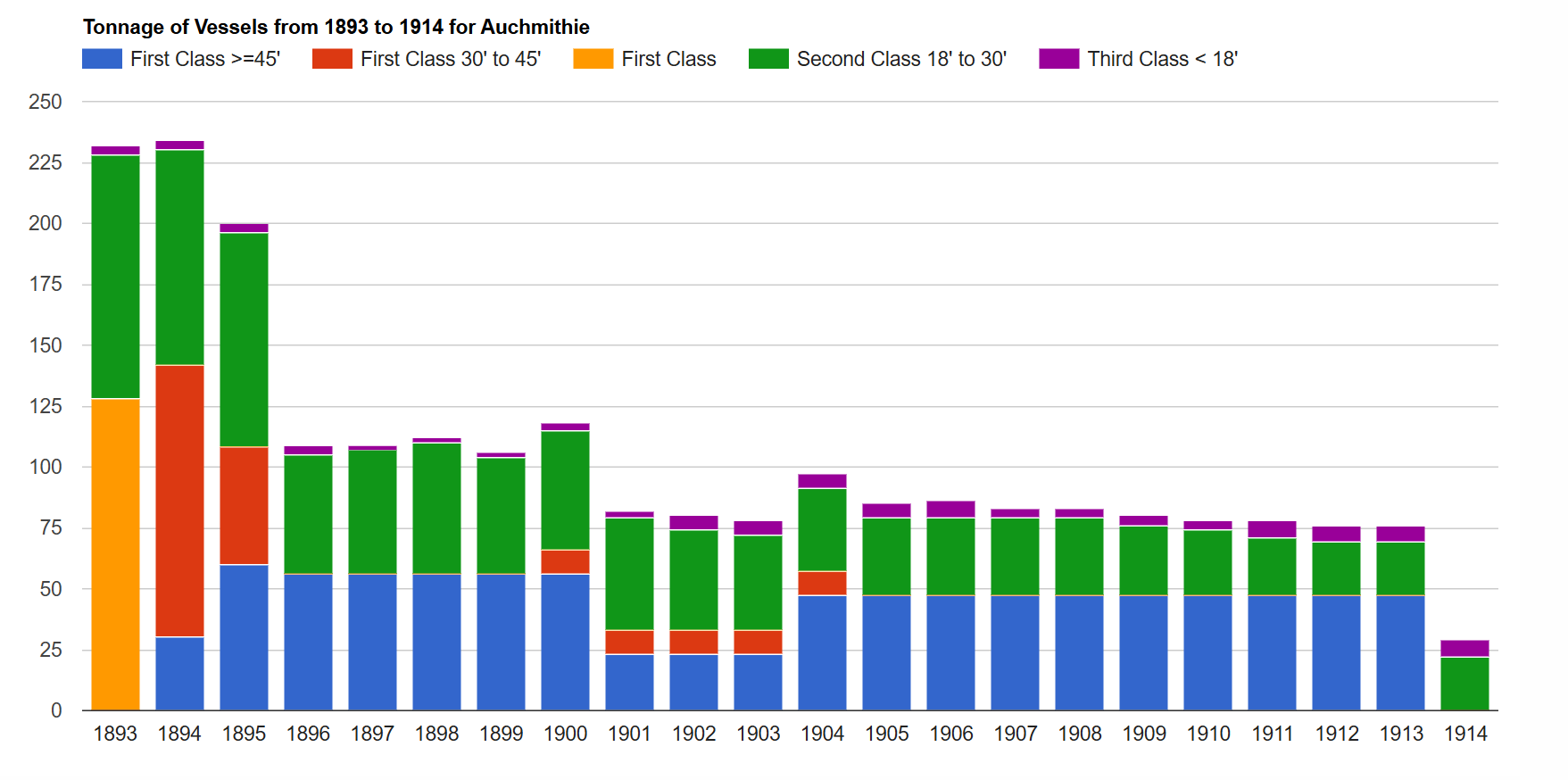
Tonnage of vessels

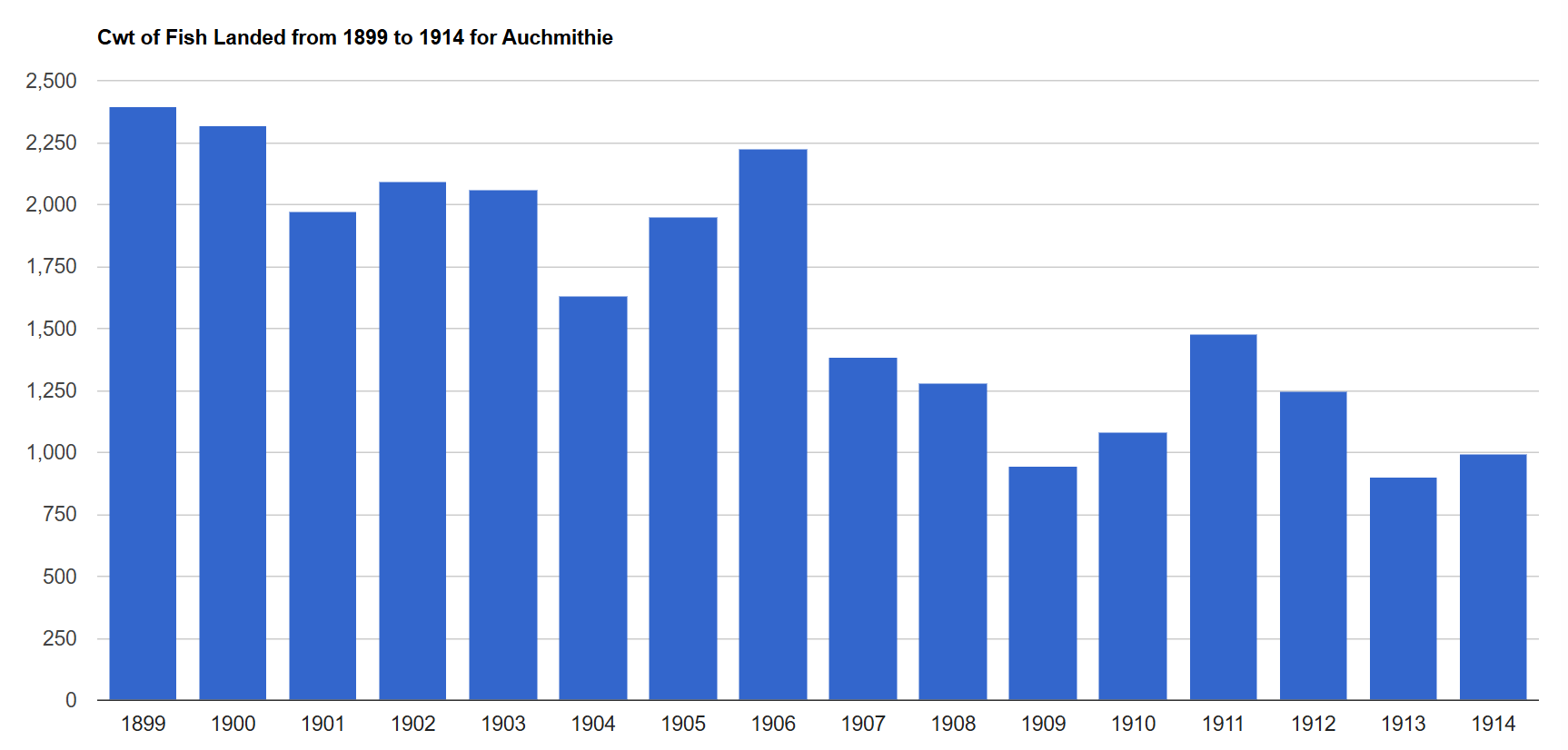
Cwt of fish landed

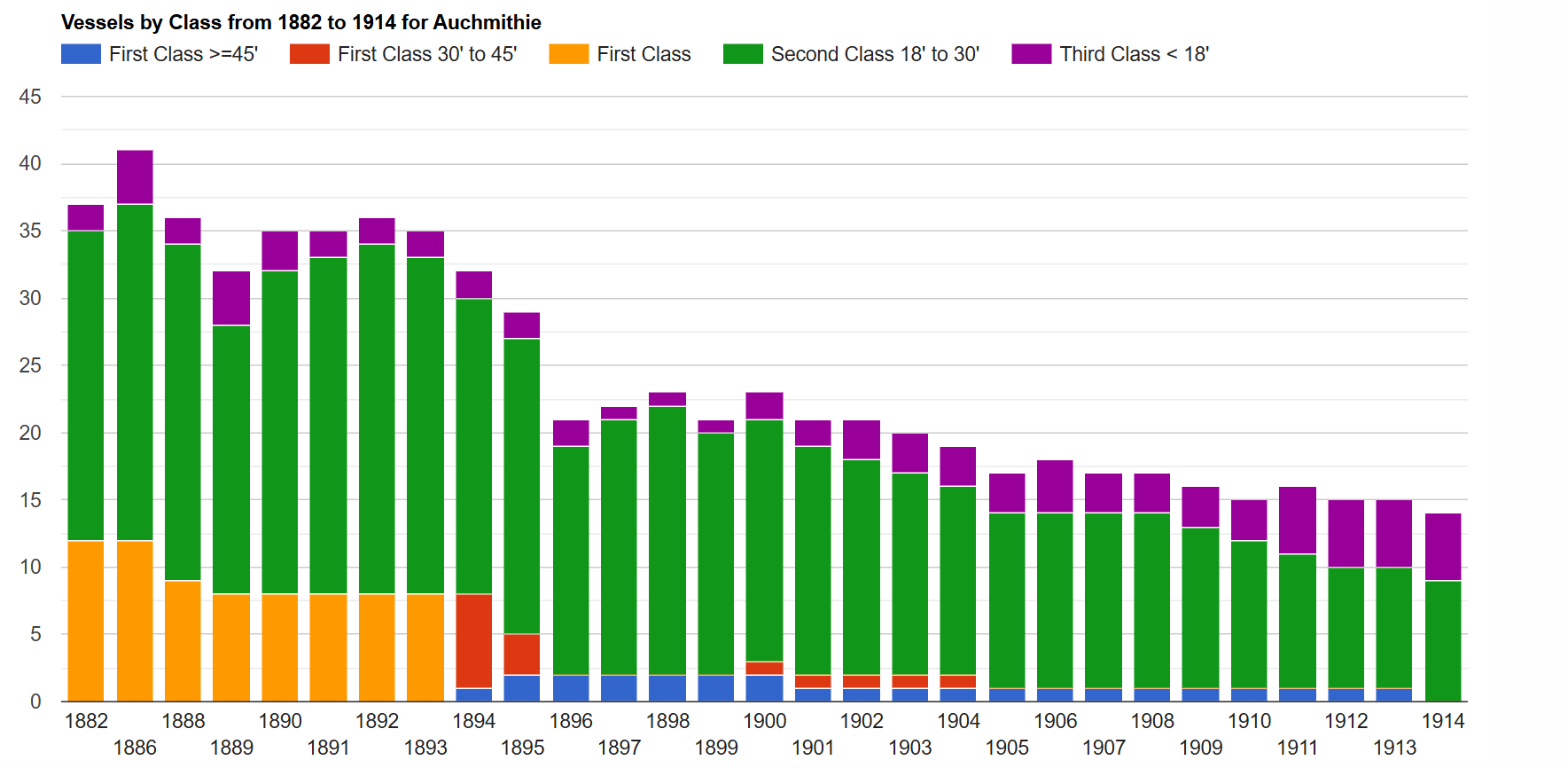
Vessels by class

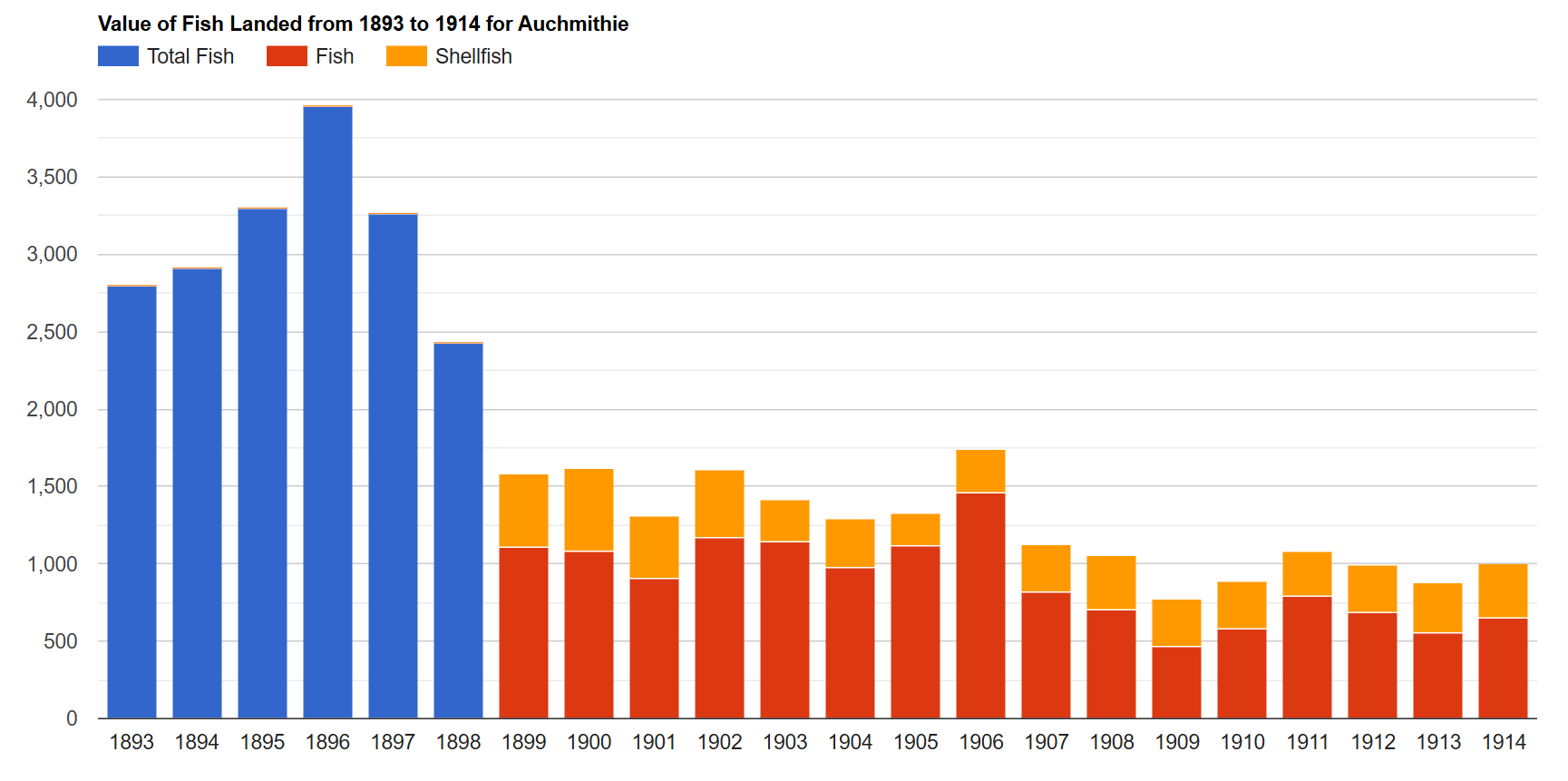
Value (£] of fish landed

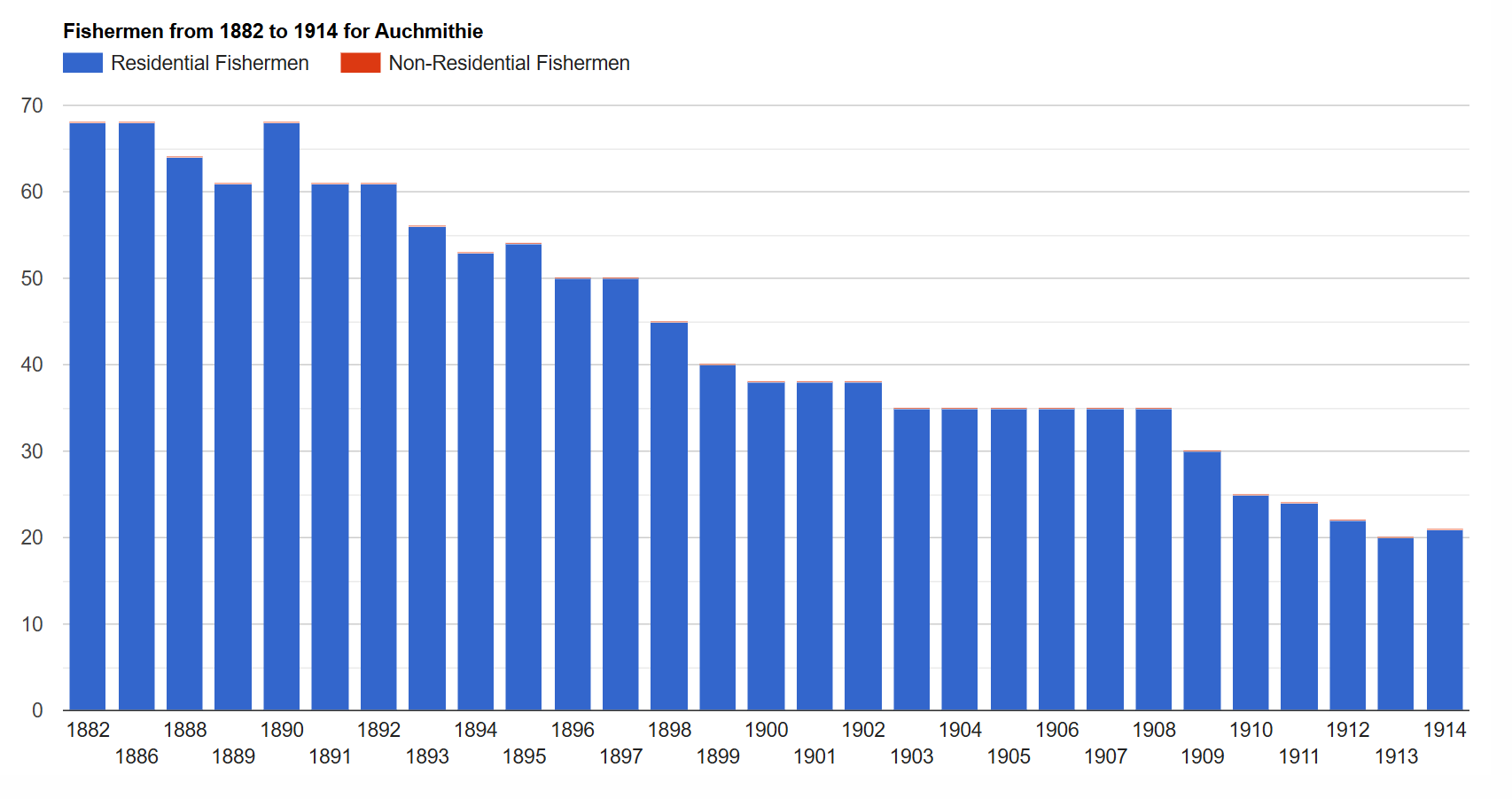
Fishermen

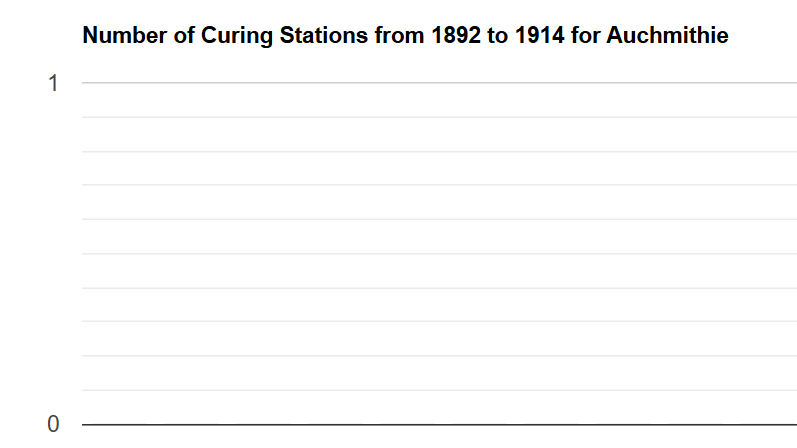
Placeholder-no curing stations
