= Menna, Cornwall =

Hamlet in Cornwall, England

Coordinates: 50.351°N 4.932°W

Menna
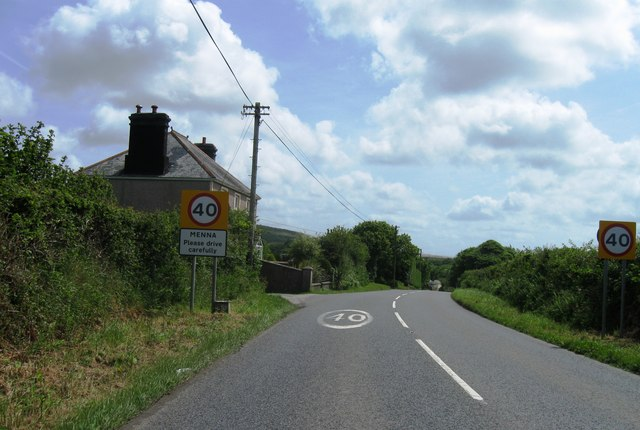
- Menna Entrance

- Location within Cornwall
- OS grid reference: SW915542
- Civil parish: Ladock
- Unitary authority: Cornwall
- Ceremonial county: Cornwall
- Region: South West
- Country: England
- Sovereign state: United Kingdom

Menna is a hamlet in the parish of Ladock, Cornwall, England. It should not be confused with Mena in the parish of Lanivet.
