= Bingley (surname) =

Bingley is an English surname; a habitational name from Bingley, in West Yorkshire, recorded in Domesday Book as 'Bingelei'; from the Old English personal name "Bynna" (or alternatively Old English 'bing' ("hollow")), plus '-inga' (lit. "of the people of") & 'leah' (lit. "woodland clearing).

Notable people with the surname include:

- Alexander Bingley (1905–1972), British naval officer, husband of Juliet
- Blanche Bingley (1863–1946), English tennis player
- John Bingley (1941–2024), Australian footballer
- Juliet Bingley (1925–2005), English social worker, wife of Alexander
- Matthew Bingley (born 1971), Australian soccer footballer
- Norman Bingley (1863–1940), British sports sailor
- Ossian Bingley Hart (1821–1874), American politician
- Ralph Bingley, (1570–1627), Welsh soldier
- Thomas Stamford Bingley Raffles (1781–1826), British statesman
- Walter Bingley (1930–2017), English footballer

Fictional characters:

- Charles Bingley, character from Jane Austen's novel Pride and Prejudice
