= William Dyce Cay =

Scottish civil engineer (1838–1925)

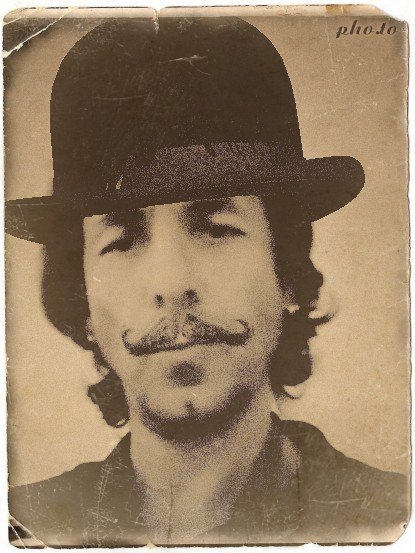
- Born: 28 March 1838; Edinburgh, Scotland
- Died: 13 December 1925 (aged 87); Folkestone, England
- Occupation: Scottish civil engineer

William Dyce Cay, MICE FRSE (28 March 1838 – 13 December 1925) was a Scottish civil engineer. He was responsible for the majority of late 19th century works to Aberdeen harbour. His cousin the physicist James Clerk Maxwell described Cay as "my best friend, my most valuable Collaborator and the best Watery Engineer in Scotland."

== Life ==
William Dyce Cay, known to his family as "Willie," was the son of Robert Dundas Cay, an Edinburgh lawyer, and Isabella Dyce (1811–1852).

In 1844 most of the family moved to Hong Kong following Robert Dundas Cay's appointment as Registrar to the Supreme Court of what was then a very new British colony, though Willie and his older brother Robert Hodshon Cay remained in Scotland for their schooling. Isabella Dyce Cay was killed in a carriage accident in Hong Kong in 1852 and is buried in the Happy Valley Cemetery in Victoria, Hong Kong. Robert Dundas Cay then returned to Scotland with his eight younger children.

After being reunited with his family on their return to Edinburgh, Willie enrolled in Edinburgh University to study mathematics; in 1856 he won the prestigious Straton Gold Medal in 1856, aided by some tutoring from his cousin James Clerk Maxwell. He then moved to Belfast to serve as an apprentice engineer under Lord Kelvin's brother, James Thomson. After working for a time as a railway and bridge engineer in Scotland and London, he began to specialise in harbour design, and thereafter spent the bulk of his working life improving Aberdeen's docks and harbours. From 1873 he was assisted by James Barron who later set up as an independent harbour engineer.

Cay was elected a Fellow of the Royal Society of Edinburgh in 1882. In 1890 he took a house on Blackford Road in Edinburgh.

He died at Folkestone, Kent on 13 December 1925.

== Known works ==
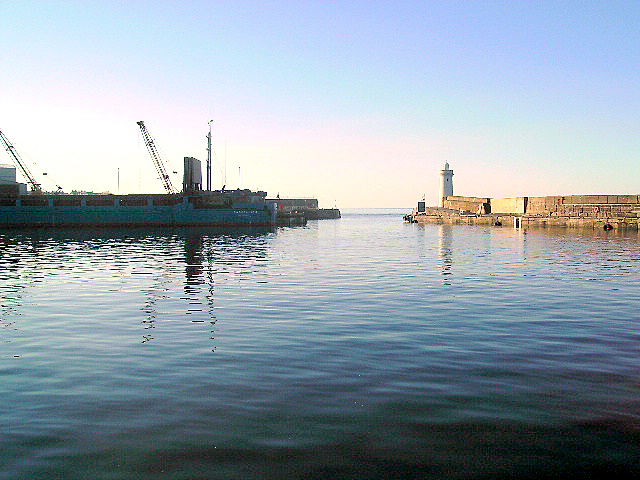
The entrance to the harbour at Buckie

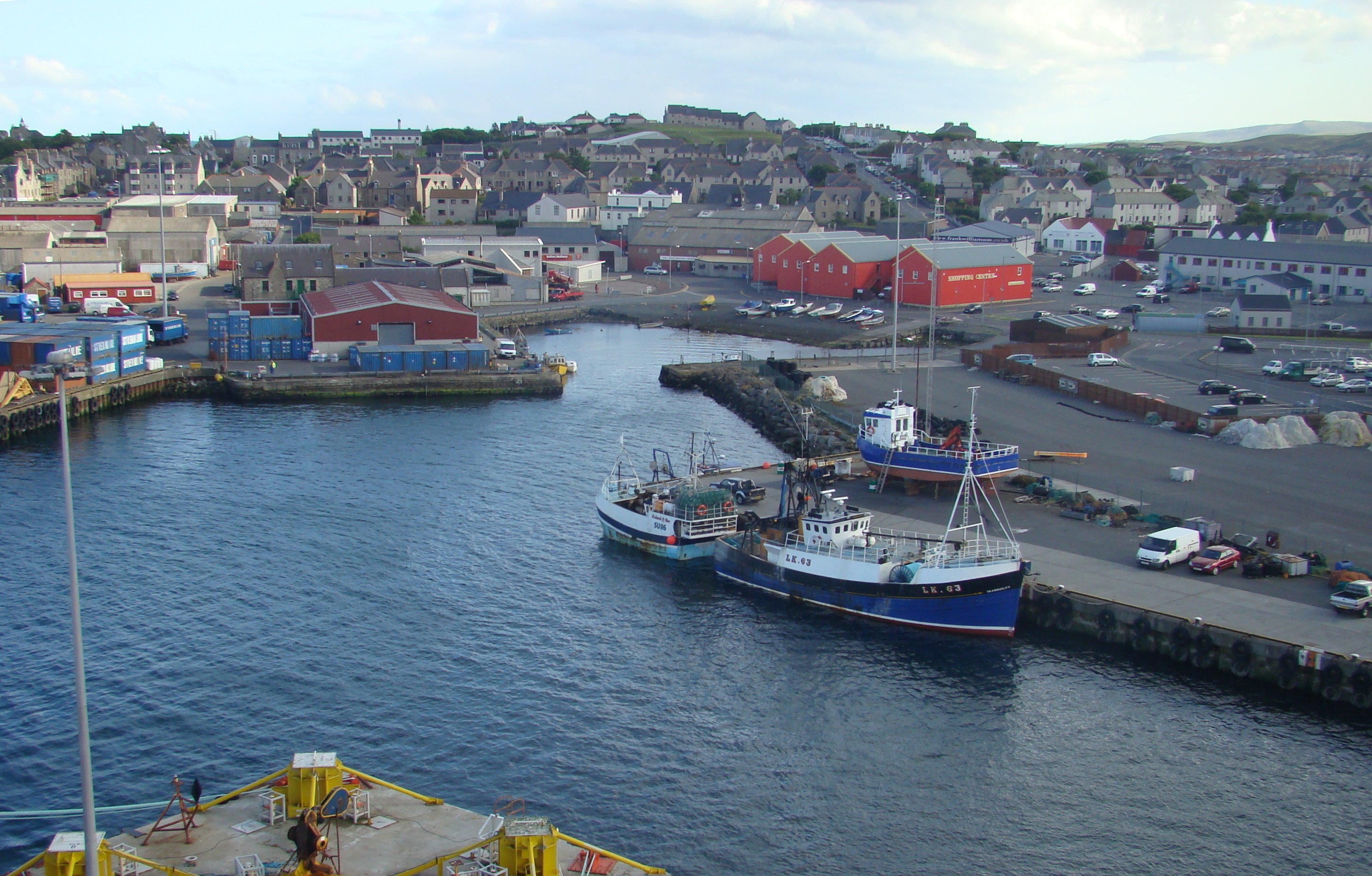
Lerwick Harbour

- Castle Douglas to Portpatrick Railway (as assistant to Benjamin Blyth) (1861)
- Glenlair Bridge near Corsock, Kirkcudbrightshire, (1861) built for his cousin, James Clerk Maxwell who owned Glenlair House
- Cluny Harbour, Buckie (1873)
- Southern Breakwater, Aberdeen Harbour (1874)
- Lerwick Harbour extensions and improvements (1881)

== Family ==
Among Cay's uncles (his mother's brothers) were the artist William Dyce and Robert Dyce, professor of midwifery at the University of Aberdeen.

James Clerk Maxwell was Cay's cousin through Robert Dundas Cay's sister, Frances Cay Clerk Maxwell. Cay and Maxwell were close friends and Cay served as Maxwell's best man at his marriage in 1858.
