= Micklethwaite (surname) =

Micklethwaite is a surname. Notable people with the surname include:

- F. W. Micklethwaite, (1849–1925), Canadian photographer
- Sir John Micklethwaite, (1612–1682), English physician
- John Thomas Micklethwaite, (1843–1906), English architect
- Joseph Micklethwaite, 1st Viscount Micklethwaite, (c. 1680–1734) English politician, peer and diplomat

== See also ==
- John Micklethwait
- Micklethwaite (disambiguation)
