= James N. Baron =

American sociologist

James N. Baron is an American sociologist.

Baron earned a bachelor's degree in sociology from Reed College, then completed further study in the subject at University of Wisconsin–Madison, and the University of California, Santa Barbara. Baron began teaching at Stanford University in 1982, where he was named Walter Kenneth Kilpatrick Professor of Organizational Behavior and Human Resources in 1992. He joined the Yale University faculty in 2006, and is currently the William S. Beinecke Professor at Yale School of Management.
