= Merry Lees =

Hamlet in Leicestershire, England

Coordinates: 52.649°N 1.307°W

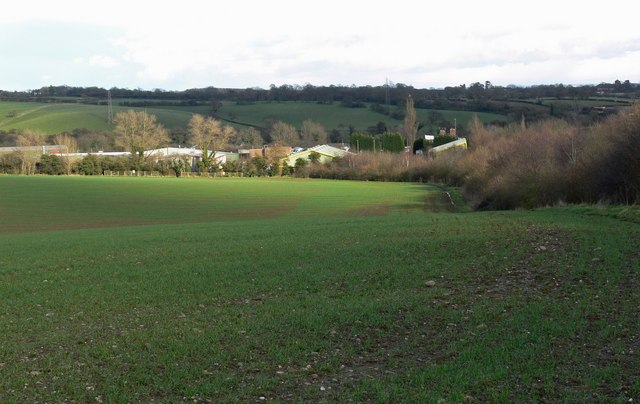
Towards the industrial estate

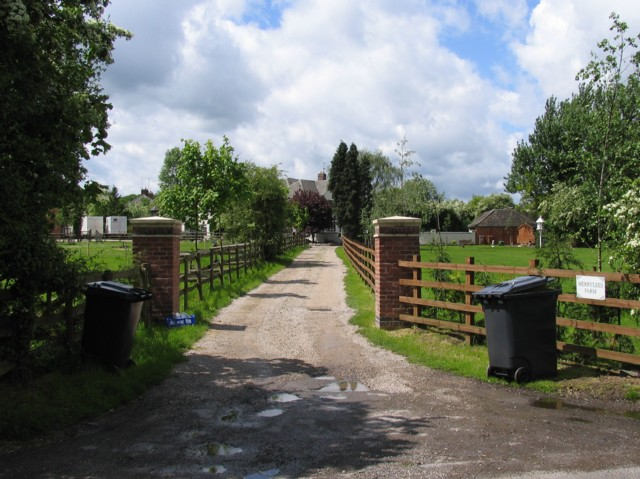
Farm

Merry Lees is a small settlement and industrial park located in the Hinckley and Bosworth district of Leicestershire, England. It forms as part of the Bagworth and Thornton civil parish. According to the 2001 census, the parish had a population of 1,836.

Merry Lees is best known for its industrial estate. There are very few housing estates, however, various farms are situated in and around the area.

Notable nearby places include Thornton, Desford, Botcheston, and Newbold Verdon. There are 2 housing groups: the old Merry lees pit houses of the miners from the mine that was there until the early-1970s, and the private houses on Merry lees Road on the road to Thornton. When the railway line used to take passengers (closed for passengers in 1968) there was a halt at the bridge in Merry Lees.
