= James Barron (harbour engineer) =

James Barron MICE JP (1842–1929) was a 19th/20th century Scottish engineer who specialised in harbour design in the north-east of Scotland.

== Life ==
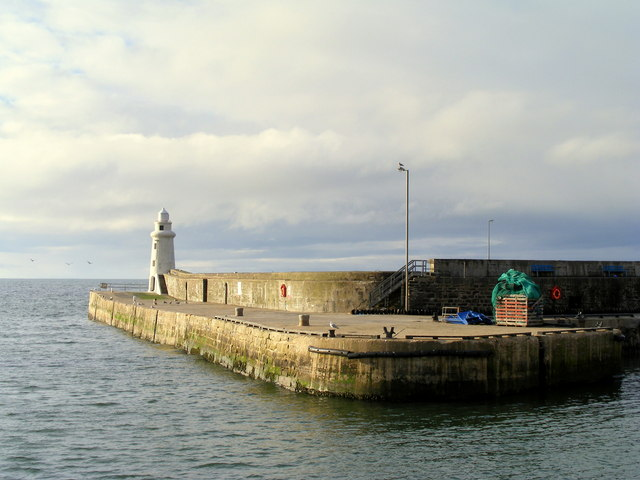
Lighthouse and harbour at Macduff

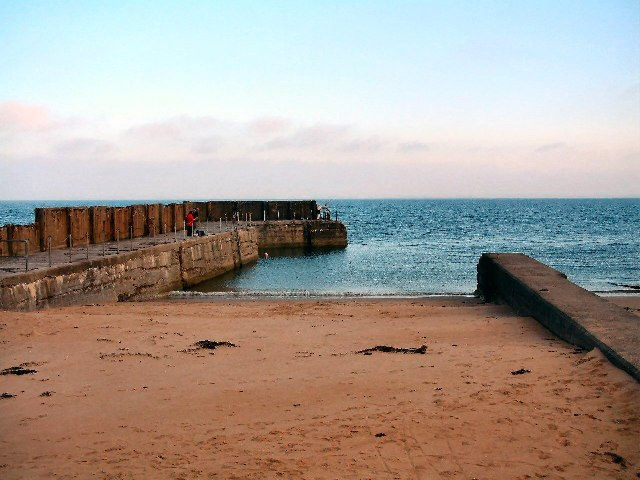
Embo harbour

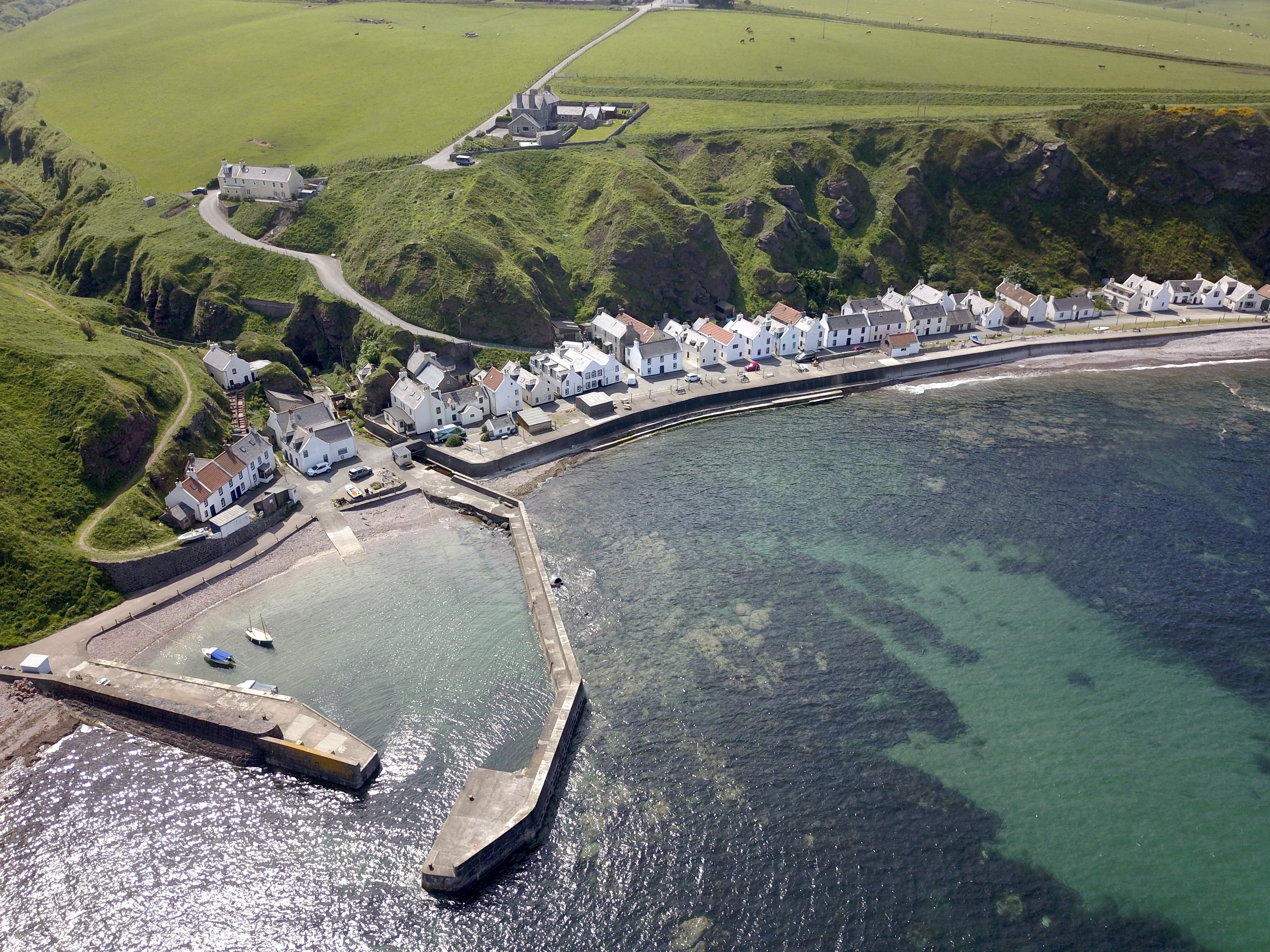
Aerial view of Pennan harbour

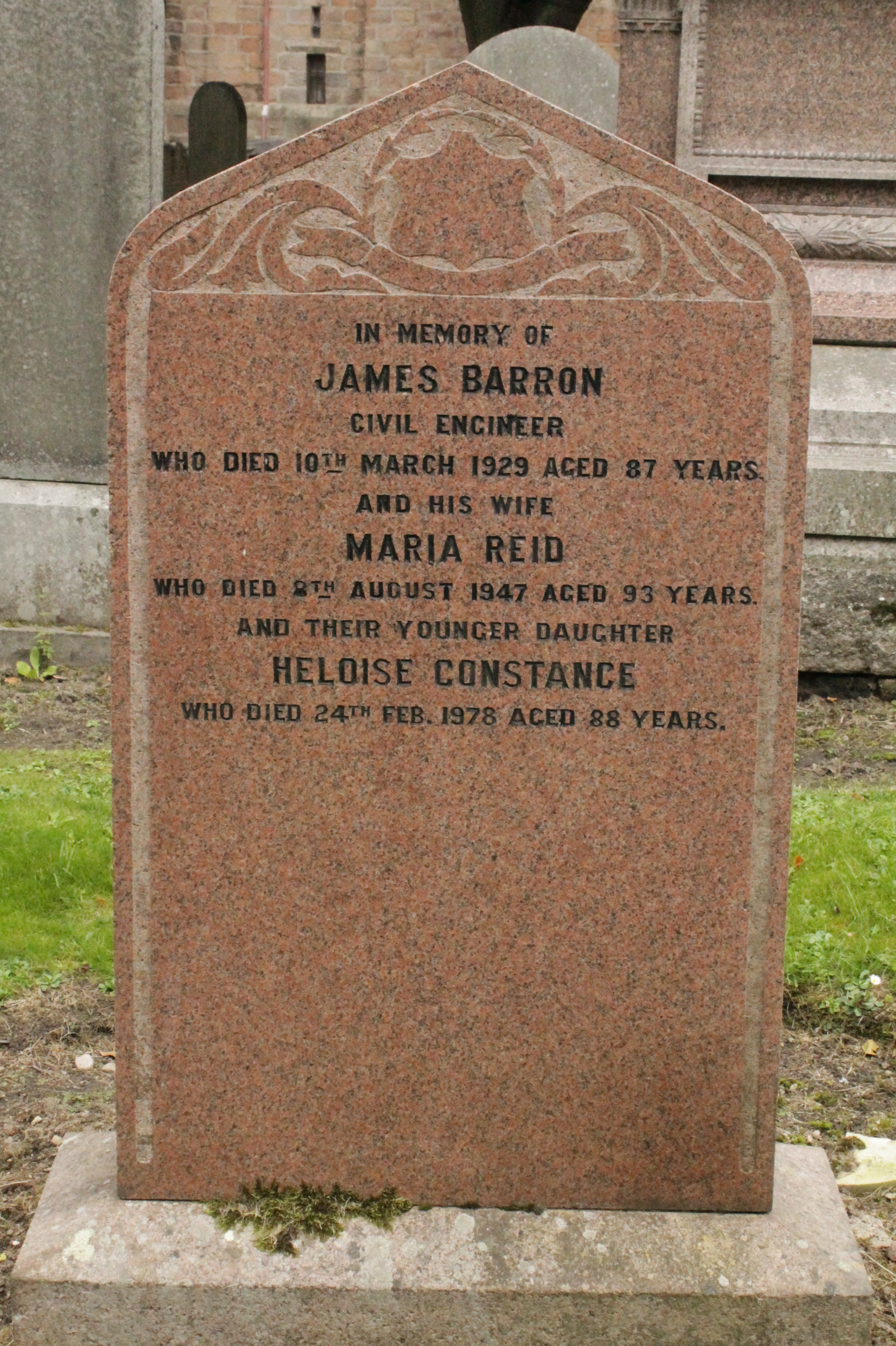
The grave of James Barron, churchyard of St Machar's Cathedral

He was born in Peterhead the son of Archibald Barron, a trainee mason, and his first wife, Elizabeth. The family moved to Aberdeen and James appears there in 1861 noted as a "carpenter".

In 1871 he appears as an "estate factor" working in Larbert and by 1881 is a "factor and engineer".

His first known employment as a harbour engineer is as assistant to William Dyce Cay building the Cluny Harbour at Buckie in 1873. In the early 1880s he and his family were living in Rathven.

Due to projects moving from town to town he frequently relocated. In 1891 he is living in Wick, Caithness.

In 1893 he was living in Aberdeen and had an office at 166 Union Street in the city centre and was living at 46 Carden Place. He became a member of the Aberdeen Philosophical Society. In Aberdeen he was also a Justice of the Peace and town councillor.

He retired in 1918 and died on 10 March 1929. He is buried in the churchyard of St Machar's Cathedral in Old Aberdeen.

== Family ==
His first wife Janet died around 1870. Their eldest son James Barron (b.1869) was also a civil engineer (operating in northern England).

Around 1875 he was married to Maria Reid (1854–1947). They had several daughters, the youngest being Heloise Constance Barron (1890–1978).

== Independent works ==
- Remodelling Burghead harbour (1882)
- Remodelling Wick outer harbour (1883)
- Auchmithie harbour (1889)
- Thurso harbour (1890)
- Embo harbour (1891)
- Remodelling Stonehaven harbour (1891 and 1899)
- Remodelling Scrabster harbour (1891)
- Triangular harbour at Helmsdale (1892)
- Collieston harbour (1893)
- Stromness harbour (1893 to 1896)
- Golspie harbour (1894)
- Bridge at Maryculter (1894)
- Upgrading water system at Macduff (1894)
- Port Henry harbour, Peterhead (1895)
- Reservoir at Huntly (1895)
- Remodelling Scalloway harbour (1896)
- Remodeling Cluny harbour at Buckie (1897)
- Warehouse on Carmelite Street near Aberdeen harbour (1900)
- Macduff harbour and lighthouse (1901)
- Pennan harbour (1902)
- Wharf at Wick (1903)
- Alexandra Wharf, Lerwick (1904) with his son J. M. Barron
- Pier at Loch Na Claise (1905)
- Pier at Lochinver (1905)
- Bridge over River Deveron in Huntly, Aberdeenshire (1910)
