= Alex Barron =

Alex Barron may refer to:

- Alex Barron (American football) (born 1982), American football player
- Alex Barron (juggler) (born 1993), British juggler
- Alex Barron (racing driver) (born 1970), American auto racing driver
