= Merther Lane =

Hamlet in Cornwall, England

Coordinates: 50.246°N 5.006°W

- Location within Cornwall
- OS grid reference: SW858428
- Civil parish: St Michael Penkevil
- Unitary authority: Cornwall
- Ceremonial county: Cornwall
- Region: South West
- Country: England
- Sovereign state: United Kingdom

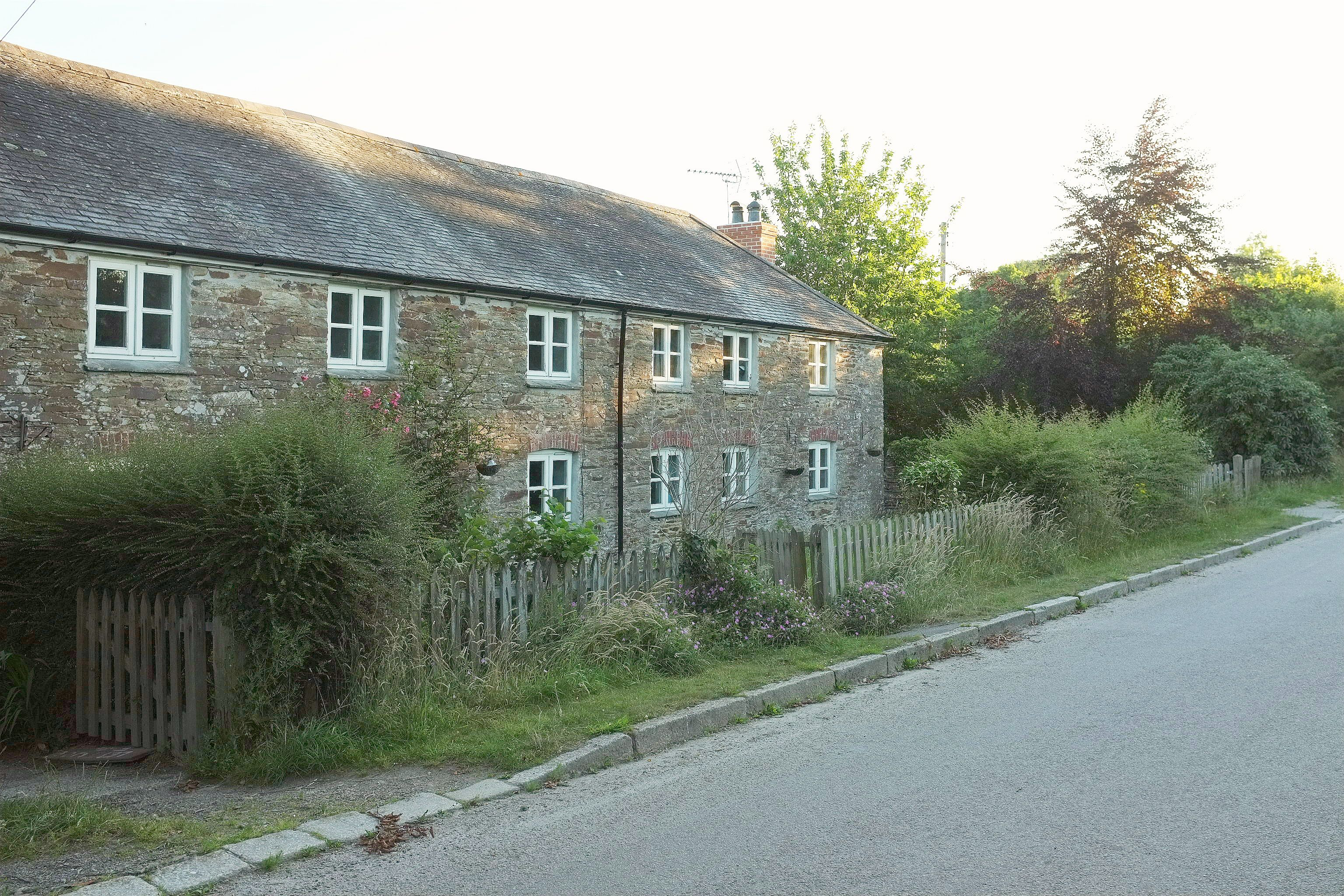
Cottages, Merther Lane

Merther Lane is a hamlet in the parish of St Michael Penkevil, Cornwall, England.
