= Samuel Barron =

Samuel Barron may refer to:

- Samuel Barron (1765–1810), United States Navy officer during the Quasi and First Barbary Wars and brother of James Barron
- Samuel Barron (1809–1888), United States and later Confederate Navy officer during the American Civil War
