= Medlyn =

Coordinates: 50.158°N 5.217°W

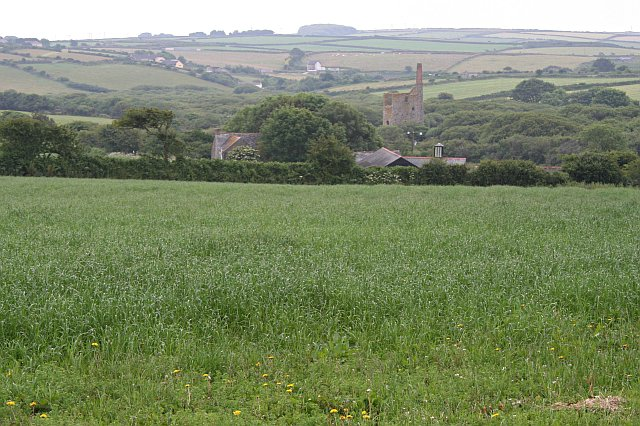
A mine engine house near Medlyn

Medlyn is a site of disused mines near Porkellis in Cornwall, England.
