= Senator Barron =

Senator Barron may refer to:

- Dempsey Barron (1922–2001), Florida State Senate
- Henry D. Barron (1833–1882), Wisconsin State Senate
- Lowell Barron (born 1942), Alabama State Senate
