= George Barron =

English footballer

Personal information
- Full name: George Ward Barron
- Date of birth: Q4 1883
- Place of birth: Darlington, England
- Date of death: 1961 (aged 77–78)
- Position: Outside right

Senior career*
Years	Team	Apps	(Gls)
- Wallsend Park Villa
1903	Sheffield Wednesday	1	(0)
- * Club domestic league appearances and goals

George Ward Barron (1883–1961) was an English professional footballer who played as an outside right. Born in Darlington, he made one appearance in the Football League First Division for Sheffield Wednesday in 1903.
