= Walter Bingley =

English footballer and manager

Personal information
- Full name: Walter Bingley
- Date of birth: 17 April 1930
- Place of birth: Sheffield, England
- Date of death: March 2017 (aged 86)
- Place of death: Sheffield, England
- Position: Full back

Senior career*
Years	Team	Apps	(Gls)
- Ecclesall M.W.
1948–1955	Bolton Wanderers	6	(0)
1955–1958	Sheffield Wednesday	38	(0)
1958–1960	Swindon Town	101	(0)
1960–1963	York City	130	(5)
1963–1964	Halifax Town	64	(1)
Total		339	(6)

Managerial career
- Hampton Sports
- * Club domestic league appearances and goals

Walter Bingley (17 April 1930 – March 2017) was an English footballer born in Sheffield who played in the Football League for Bolton Wanderers, Sheffield Wednesday, Swindon Town, York City and Halifax Town.

After signing for Sheffield Wednesday in 1955, he helped the club gain promotion to Division One in his first season with them.
