= Melinsey =

Coordinates: 50.215°N 4.936°W

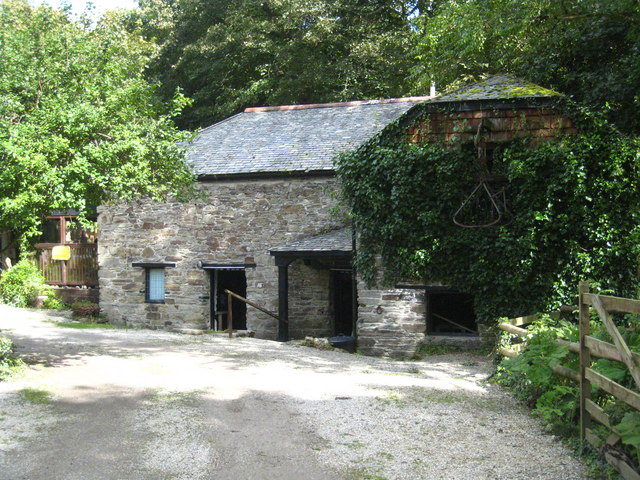
- Melinsey Watermill

- Location within Cornwall
- OS grid reference: SW906392
- Civil parish: Veryan
- Unitary authority: Cornwall
- Ceremonial county: Cornwall
- Region: South West
- Country: England
- Sovereign state: United Kingdom

Melinsey is a hamlet south of Ruan High Lanes in Cornwall, England. The name is derived from the Cornish word "melinjy" which means "mill house".

Melinsey Watermill dates from the Middle Ages and has been restored to working order. It was originally built to grind wheat into food for livestock. It has a Cafe specializing in Cornish cream teas and a craft shop.
