= Meon, Hampshire =

Hamlet in Hampshire, England

Coordinates: 50°49′42″N 1°14′30″W

Meon
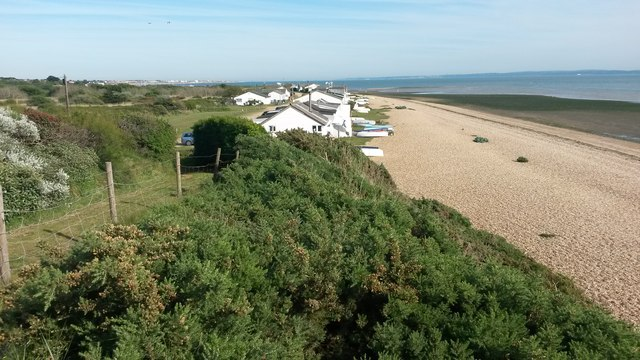
- View of Meon Shore Chalets

- Location within Hampshire
- OS grid reference: SU530034
- District: Fareham
- Shire county: Hampshire
- Region: South East
- Country: England
- Sovereign state: United Kingdom
- UK Parliament: Hamble Valley

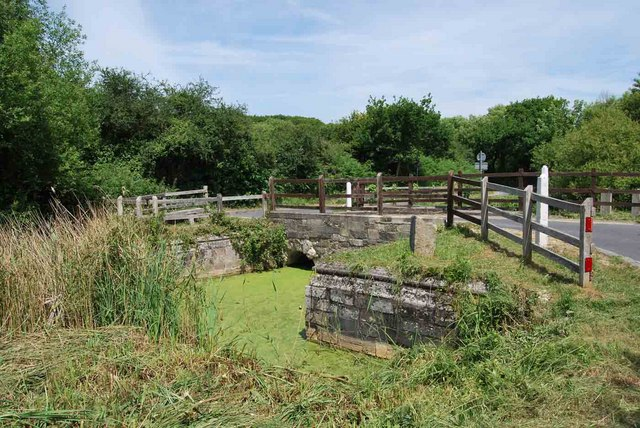
Road to Meon at a drainage channel

Meon is a coastal hamlet in the Fareham district, in south Hampshire, England.

A settlement with two households was recorded in the 1086 Domesday Book at Mene. Meon Farm was an old timber and red-brick building in Meon.
