= Bishop Barron =

Bishop Barron may refer to:

- Robert Barron (born 1959), Roman Catholic Bishop of Winona–Rochester, Minnesota, US
- Patrick Barron (bishop) (1911–1991), Anglican Bishop of George, South Africa
- Edward Barron (1801–1854), Roman Catholic Bishop of Eucarpia
