= Bingley, Alberta =

Coordinates: 52.4579°N 114.7934°W

Bingley is a locality in Alberta, Canada.

The locality takes its name from Bingley, in England.
