= Andrew Barron (cricketer) =

New Zealand cricketer

Personal information
- Born: 2 July 1881; Christchurch, New Zealand
- Died: 2 August 1915 (aged 34); Wellington, New Zealand
- Batting: Right-handed
- Source: Cricinfo, 14 October 2020

Andrew Barron (2 July 1881 – 2 August 1915) was a New Zealand cricketer. He played in one first-class match for Canterbury in 1904/05, and one first-class match for Wellington in 1905/06.

Barron was educated at Otago Boys' High School in Dunedin. He married Minnie Gaffaney in Temuka in April 1906. He worked in the Customs Department. After being ill for some time, he died in August 1915, aged 34, leaving his widow and three children.
