= Micklethwaite, Cumbria =

Hamlet in Cumbria, England

Coordinates: 54.844°N 3.114°W

Micklethwaite
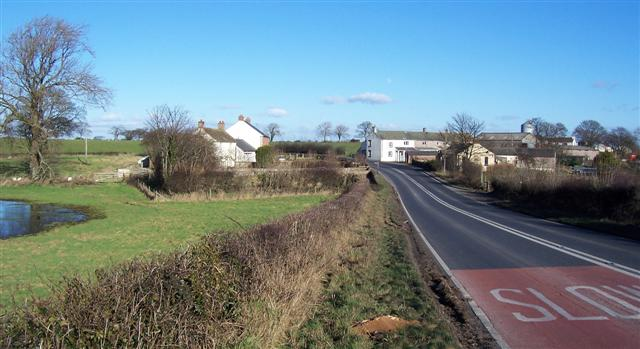
- Micklethwaite

- Location in Allerdale, Cumbria Location within Cumbria
- OS grid reference: NY284504
- Civil parish: Thursby
- Unitary authority: Cumberland
- Ceremonial county: Cumbria
- Region: North West
- Country: England
- Sovereign state: United Kingdom
- Post town: WIGTON
- Postcode district: CA7
- Dialling code: 016973
- Police: Cumbria
- Fire: Cumbria
- Ambulance: North West
- UK Parliament: Penrith and Solway

Micklethwaite is a hamlet in Cumbria, England, close to the Lake District. It is situated to the north east of Wigton.
