= Mena, Cornwall =

Coordinates: 50.430°N 4.760°W

Mena
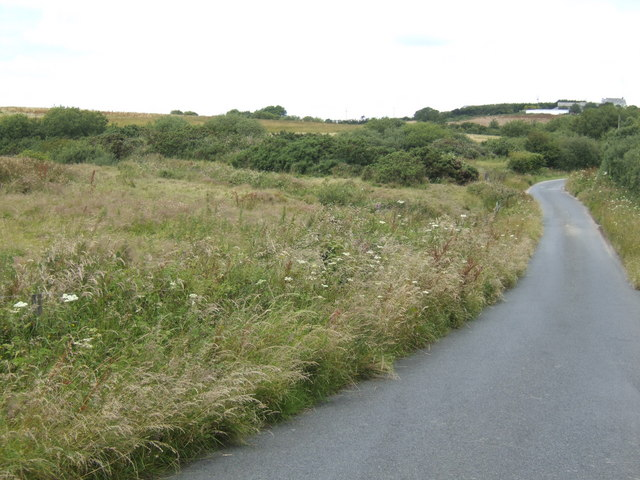
- Mena Moor

- Location within Cornwall
- OS grid reference: SX041625
- Civil parish: Lanivet
- Unitary authority: Cornwall
- Ceremonial county: Cornwall
- Region: South West
- Country: England
- Sovereign state: United Kingdom

Mena is a hamlet in the parish of Lanivet in mid Cornwall, England. It should not be confused with Menna in the parish of Ladock.
