= Micklethwaite, Bradford =

Village in West Yorkshire, England

Coordinates: 53.8677°N 1.8426°W

Micklethwaite
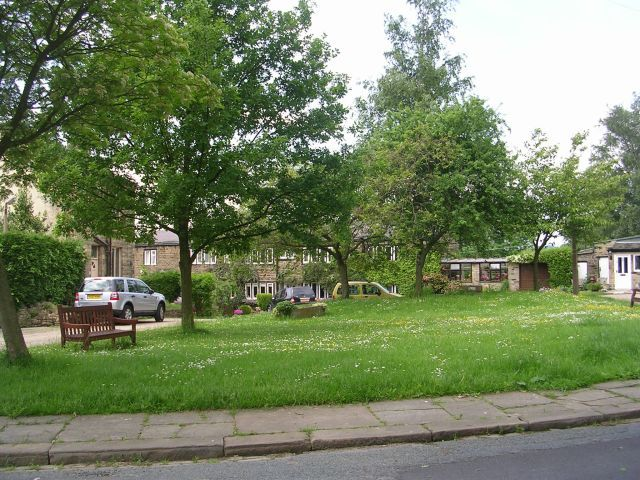
- Village Green - Micklethwaite Lane

- Location within West Yorkshire
- OS grid reference: SE103415
- Civil parish: Bingley
- Metropolitan borough: Bradford
- Metropolitan county: West Yorkshire
- Region: Yorkshire and the Humber
- Country: England
- Sovereign state: United Kingdom
- Post town: BINGLEY
- Postcode district: BD16
- Police: West Yorkshire
- Fire: West Yorkshire
- Ambulance: Yorkshire

Micklethwaite is a village in the civil parish of Bingley, in the Bradford district, in the county of West Yorkshire, England. The village is separated from Bingley end of Crossflatts by the Leeds and Liverpool Canal. It is part of Bingley ward, and population statistics are accounted for in the ward censuses.

== History ==
Micklethwaite is 1.2 miles (2 km) north of Bingley, and 2.5 miles (4 km) east of Keighley. The village is mentioned in the Domesday Book as being part of Bingley, among many other smaller settlements, and having six ploughlands and woodland. The village was recorded in the Domesday Book as Muceltu(o)it, and derives from two Old Norse words of Mikill and þveit, meaning Great Clearing. Historically in the wapentake of Skyrack, the village was linked as part of Bingley, with the township being known as Bingley-with-Micklethwaite.

The village developed as an agricultural hamlet, but during the 19th century, worsted mills were opened up on the south side of the village adjoining the Leeds and Liverpool Canal. The canal was opened in the late 1770s, but the current single-lane steel swing bridge dates from 1985. The bridge at Micklethwaite, known to the canal as bridge 199, is built on ancient road connect Bingley with Ilkley over Hawksworth Moor. The bridge was also an embarkation/disembarkation point for canal services to and from Skipton and the west, before the railway arrived in the valley.

In 1875, the Methodist chapel was built to replace an earlier structure.

Since 1974, the village has been located in West Yorkshire. Proposals for a new town council for Bingley in 2000, left Crossflatts and Micklethwaite out as the railway bridge in Crossflatts was the boundary between Bingley ward and Rombalds Ward, with Micklethwaite being tied to Ilkley. In April 2016, the new Bingley Town Council was created, with Micklethwaite coming under the remit of the new town council.

The village is part of Bingley Ward, whose population at the 2011 census was 18,294. Part of the village was designated as a conservation area in 2005, which listed an accurate population of 270 people in Micklethwaite in 1996.
