= Bingley (ward) =

Coordinates: 53.8509°N 1.8380°W

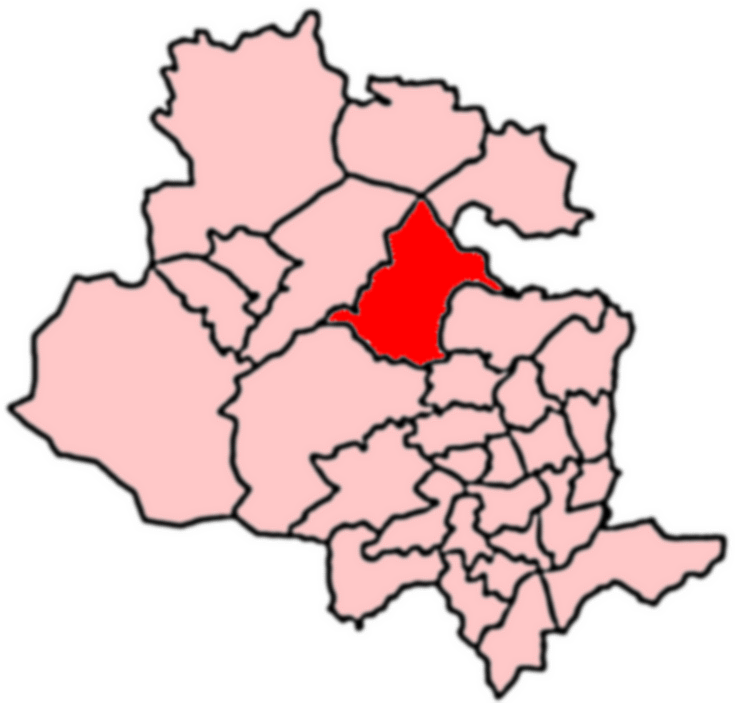
- 2004 Boundaries of Bingley Ward

- Location within West Yorkshire
- Population: 18,294 (2011 census)
- OS grid reference: SE106394
- Metropolitan borough: City of Bradford
- Metropolitan county: West Yorkshire
- Region: Yorkshire and the Humber
- Country: England
- Sovereign state: United Kingdom
- Post town: BRADFORD
- Postcode district: BD16
- Dialling code: 01274
- Police: West Yorkshire
- Fire: West Yorkshire
- Ambulance: Yorkshire
- UK Parliament: Shipley
- Councillors: Colin Mathew Gill (Conservative Party); David Heseltine (Conservative Party); Robin Ernest Owens (Conservative Party)

Bingley (population 13,675 - 2001 UK census, 18,294 at the 2011 Census) is a Ward in Bradford Metropolitan District in the county of West Yorkshire, England, named after the town of Bingley around which it is centred.

As well as the town of Bingley the ward includes the conurbated villages of Eldwick, Gilstead, the slightly detached village of Micklethwaite and part of Crossflatts (the rest of which is located in Keighley East). The ward also extends to cover a substantial section of the moorland above the town.
