= Merry Hill, Hertfordshire =

Partly wooded area

Coordinates: 51.631°N 0.370°W

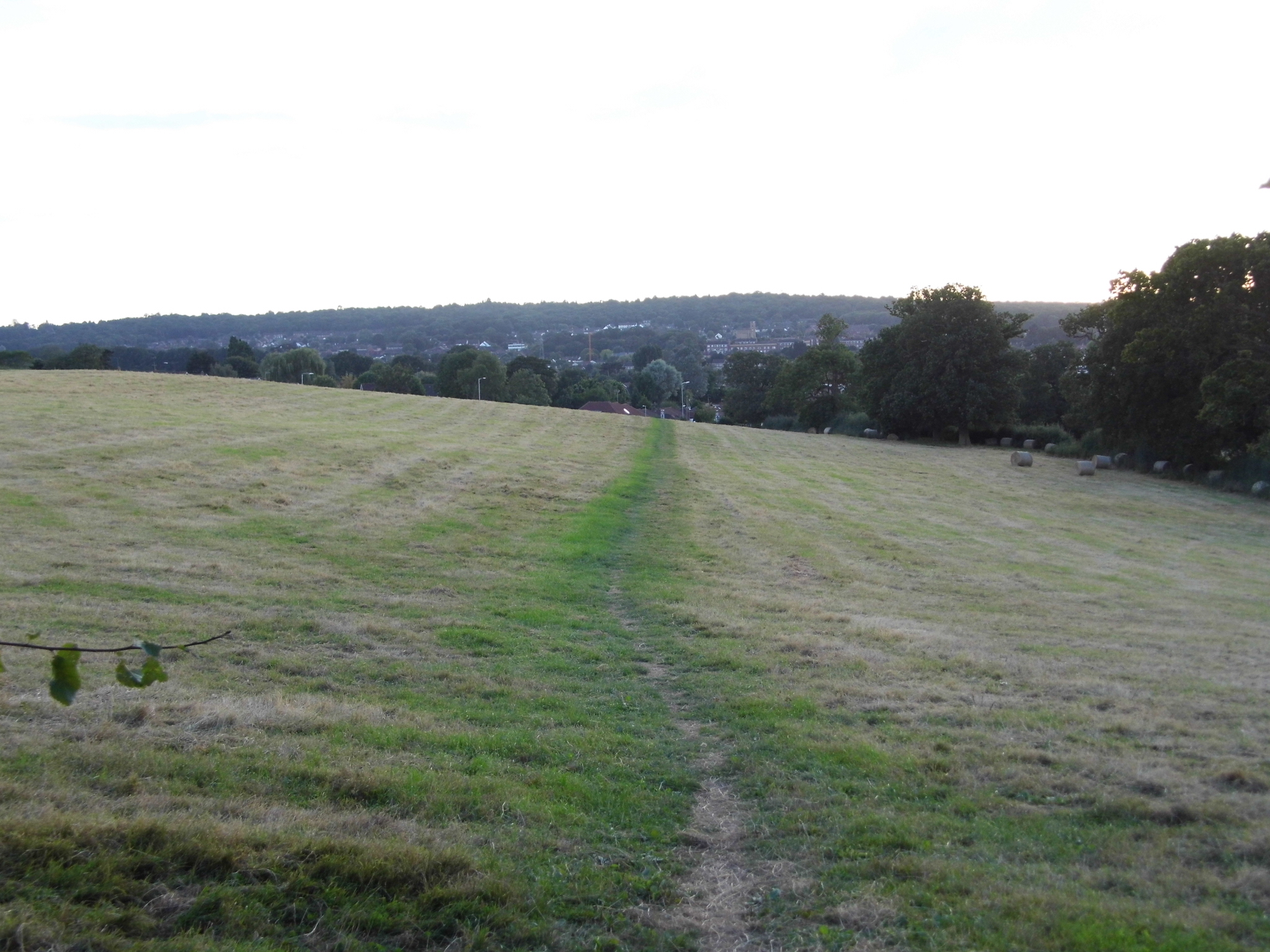
Merry Hill looking towards Carpenders Park

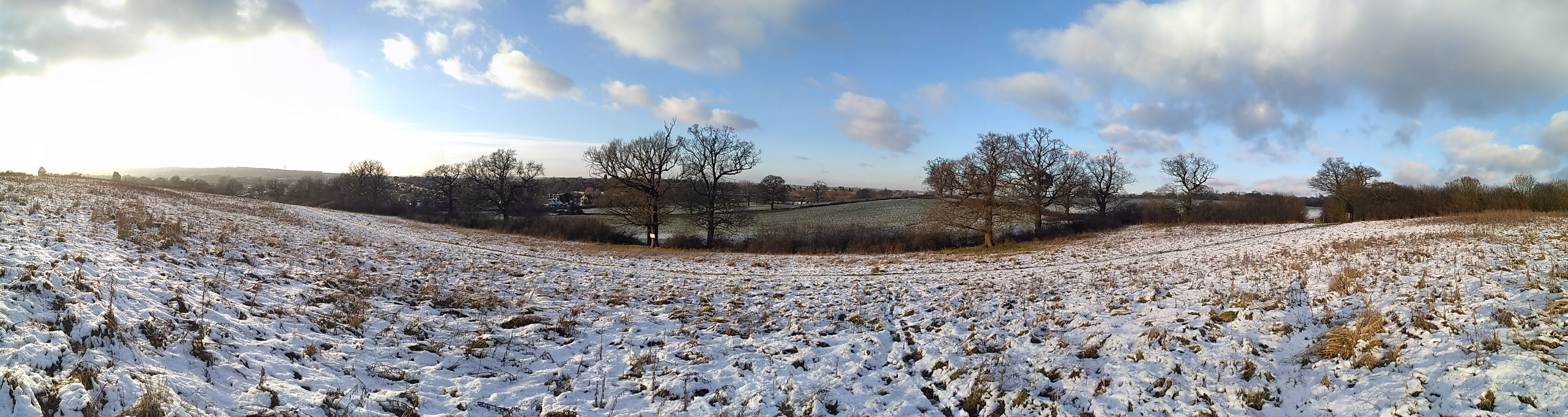
A panorama in the snow

Merry Hill is a 76 hectare partly wooded area in Hertfordshire, England, managed by the Woodland Trust. To the north is Oxhey Village and Bushey, to the west is South Oxhey and Carpenders Park, to the south is Hatch End and Harrow Weald, and to the north-east is Bushey Heath.

The Woodland Trust acquired part of the site in 1996, and carried out tree-planting; part of the new woodland has been given the name Little Hartsbourne Wood. In 1998 the Trust took a lease on another area which has been planted with fruit trees.

Merry Hill is also the name of a southwestern area of Bushey Village.

The view from Merry Hill can reach as far as Windsor near London.
