= Doug Barron (footballer) =

Scottish footballer

Personal information
- Full name: Doug Barron
- Position: Defender

Senior career*
| Years | Team | Apps | (Gls) |
| 1980–1992 | St Johnstone | 261 | (7) |
| 1992–1993 | Clydebank | 27 | (0) |
| 1993–1995 | East Fife | 30 | (0) |
- * Club domestic league appearances and goals

Doug Barron is a Scottish former professional footballer and actor who played as a defender. Born in Edinburgh, he played over 300 matches in the Scottish Football League for a total of three clubs.
