= Causeway End railway station =

Former railway station in Scotland

Coordinates: 54.9060°N 4.4651°W

Causeway End

General information
- Location: Wigtown, Wigtownshire; Scotland
- Platforms: 1

Other information
- Status: Disused

History
- Original company: Wigtownshire Railway

Key dates
- May 1875: Station opened
- 6 August 1885: Station closed to passengers
Location

Causeway End (NX 42047 59602) or Causwayend was a railway station on the Wigtownshire Railway branch line, from Newton Stewart to Whithorn, of the Portpatrick and Wigtownshire Joint Railway. It served a very rural area in Wigtownshire. The station closed in 1885, however it remained open to goods as Causeway End Siding.

== History ==
The Portpatrick and Wigtownshire Joint Railway was formed from the amalgamation of two railway companies: The Portpatrick Railway and the Wigtownshire Railway, which got into financial difficulties; they merged and were taken over.

The single platformed station stood off the side of the Wigtown to Newton Stewart road with two entrances leading separately to either side of the single track. On the northern side was a single short siding running to loading dock.

The nearby overbridge was also known as Causeway End Siding Bridge.

Mains of Penninghame Platform railway station stood close to the Clachan of Penninghame on the line towards Newton Stewart.

== Other stations ==
- Newton Stewart - junction
- Mains of Penninghame
- Kirkinner
- Whauphill
- Sorbie
- Millisle
  - Garlieston
- Broughton Skeog
- Whithorn

Preceding station	Historical railways	Following station
Mains of Penninghame; Line and station closed	Portpatrick and Wigtownshire Joint Railway	Wigtown; Line and station closed
