= Broughton Skeog railway station =

Disused railway station in Scotland

Coordinates: 54.7677°N 4.4023°W

Broughton Skeog
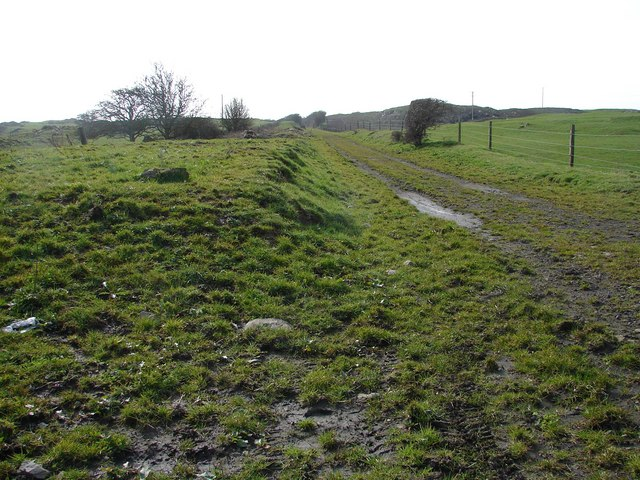
- The old Broughton Skeog Station site

General information
- Location: Garlieston, Wigtownshire; Scotland

Other information
- Status: Disused

History
- Original company: Wigtownshire Railway
- Pre-grouping: Caledonian, Glasgow & South Western, Midland and London North Western Railways

Key dates
- December 1877: Opened
- 6 August 1885: Closed to passengers
- 1964: Line closed completely
Location

Broughton Skeog (NX4554444071) was a railway station that was located near level crossing gates over a minor road on the Wigtownshire Railway branch line, from Newton Stewart, of the Portpatrick and Wigtownshire Joint Railway. It served a rural area in Wigtownshire and was named after the nearby farm. Although the station closed as far back as 1885 the line was not closed to passenger services until 1950, and to goods in 1964.

== History ==
The Portpatrick and Wigtownshire Joint Railway was formed from the amalgamation of two railway companies: The Portpatrick Railway and the Wigtownshire Railway, which got into financial difficulties; they merged and were taken over.

The station stood close to a controlled level crossing and was reached by a short lane which Ordnance Survey maps show had a crossing keeper's hut. After the station was closed an unusual siding remained for some years with centrally positioned points. Signals controlling the crossing may have been housed within the small building shown on the map. By 1907 the signals and siding had been removed.

== Other stations ==
- Newton Stewart – junction
- Causewayend
- Mains of Penninghame
- Wigtown
- Kirkinner
- Whauphill
- Sorbie
- Millisle
  - Garlieston
- Whithorn
- List of closed railway stations in Britain

Preceding station	Historical railways	Following station
Millisle; Line and station closed	Portpatrick and Wigtownshire Joint Railway	Whithorn; Line and station closed
