= Sorbie =

Coordinates: 54.79°N 4.43°W

Sorbie: Scottish Gaelic: Soirbidh
- Location within Dumfries and Galloway
- Council area: Dumfries and Galloway
- Lieutenancy area: Wigtown
- Country: Scotland
- Sovereign state: United Kingdom
- Post town: Newton Stewart
- Postcode district: DG8
- Police: Scotland
- Fire: Scottish
- Ambulance: Scottish
- UK Parliament: Dumfries & Galloway
- Scottish Parliament: Galloway and West Dumfries

Sorbie (Scottish Gaelic: Soirbidh) is a small village in Wigtownshire, Machars, within the administration area of Dumfries and Galloway Council, Scotland.

It is located midway between Wigtown and Whithorn on the A714 road.

Farming forms the principal local industry in the area.

The Sorbie Village Hall is used by a number of groups.

Sorbie Parish Church, in the centre of the village, dates from around 1755 and is a large T-plan structure, now de-roofed.

Millisle Church, 1 km west of Garlieston, was designed by Alan Stewart, the 10th Earl of Galloway (1835 - 1901).

A junction on the Wigtownshire Railway opened in Millisle in 1876. Sorbie Railway Station on the Wigtownshire Railway branch of the Portpatrick and Wigtownshire Joint Railway which closed in the 1964 formerly served Sorbie village.

For many years Sorbie had a creamery located beside the railway station, some of whose products were once exported via the port at nearby Garlieston. The creamery finally closed in the 1990s and the site occupied by a granite works. Galloway Granite has now relocated to Newton Stewart and the works now appear to be abandoned and in a state of dereliction.

== History ==
Sorbie parish was a seventeenth-century amalgamation of Sorbie, Kirkmadrine and Cruggleton. Timothy Pont's 17th century map shows Kirck of Cruggeltown

Ainslie's 1782 map shows Sorby Parish and the church by the Village of Sorbie

In 1846 the parish was an area about six miles in length, and between three and a half to nearly six miles in breadth, composed of 9000 acres of which 7700 are arable with a moderate proportion of meadow and pasture, 400 woodland and plantations, and the remainder moor.

Cruggleton Castle which was abandoned in the 17th century, is a few miles south of Garlieston.

Sorbie Tower, one mile east of the village of Sorbie, was the seat of the Clan Hannay.

There is an early medieval motte near Sorbie Tower.

The old places of Broughton Skeog and Broughton Mill are shown just west of Galloway House, Sorbie in John Ainslie's 1782 map.

Galloway House, the seat of the Earl of Galloway, is a stately mansion erected about the middle of the 18th century, and situated on the nearby coast between Garliestown Bay and Rigg Bay. Located within Galloway House Gardens are the ruins of a few cottages. The cottages mark the site of Carswell village that was situated in Rigg Bay. When the Earl of Galloway decided he wanted to build a grand new house called Galloway House close by, he moved the people from Carswell.

On Ainslie's AD1782 map Dowalton Loch (Longcastle) is shown to be in the parish of Sorbie.

In west Sorbie is the site of Dowalton Loch, also called Ravenston and Longcastle. The loch was about 3 miles in circumference and from six to twenty feet deep which, when drained, was found to contain two small islands or lake dwellings of the pre-historic inhabitants. Five canoes were found in the loch. On the islands, and in their neighbourhood were also discovered several vessels of bronze, beads of glass, vitreous paste and amber, querns, whetstones, etc. (Ref. Dr. Stuart's address to the Archaeological Society of Glasgow, 1865–6).

Doon Hill fort or settlement just below the highest point of Doon Hill, on a slope facing SW, consisting of two earthen ramparts with a medial ditch, measuring 44m E-W by 34m transversely from centre to centre of the inner rampart. An entrance may have been in the NW side. The dimensions and form of the earthwork, together with its situation on sloping ground, place it in a class common in Wigtownshire.

Eggerness Iron-Age Promontory Fort is in Sorbie.

== Gallery ==
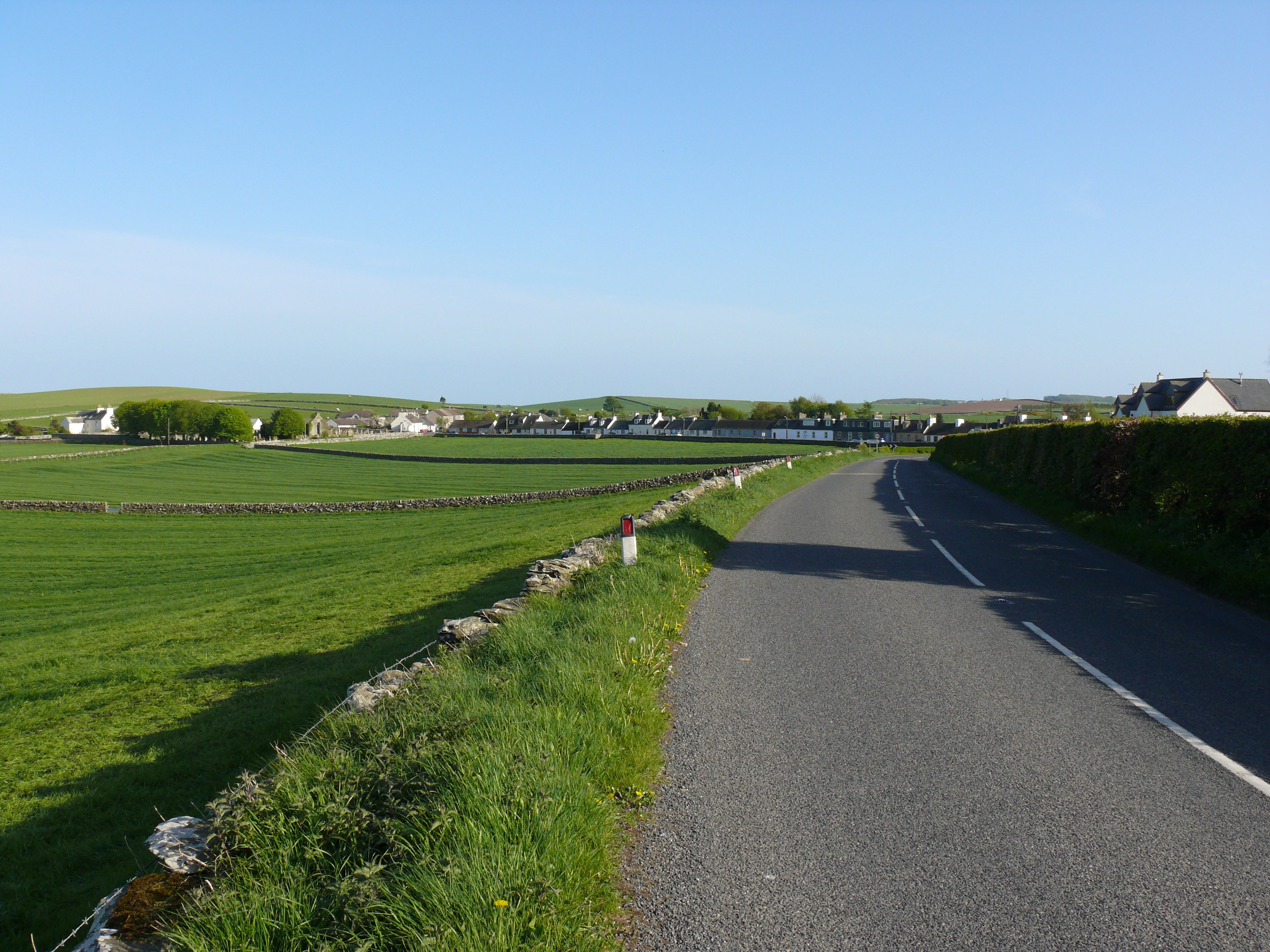
Sorbie Village, Wigtownshire.

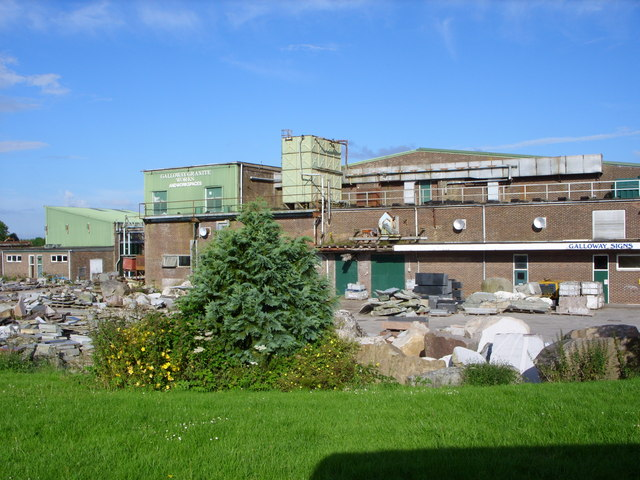
Galloway Granite Works, formerly a creamery, north of Sorbie.

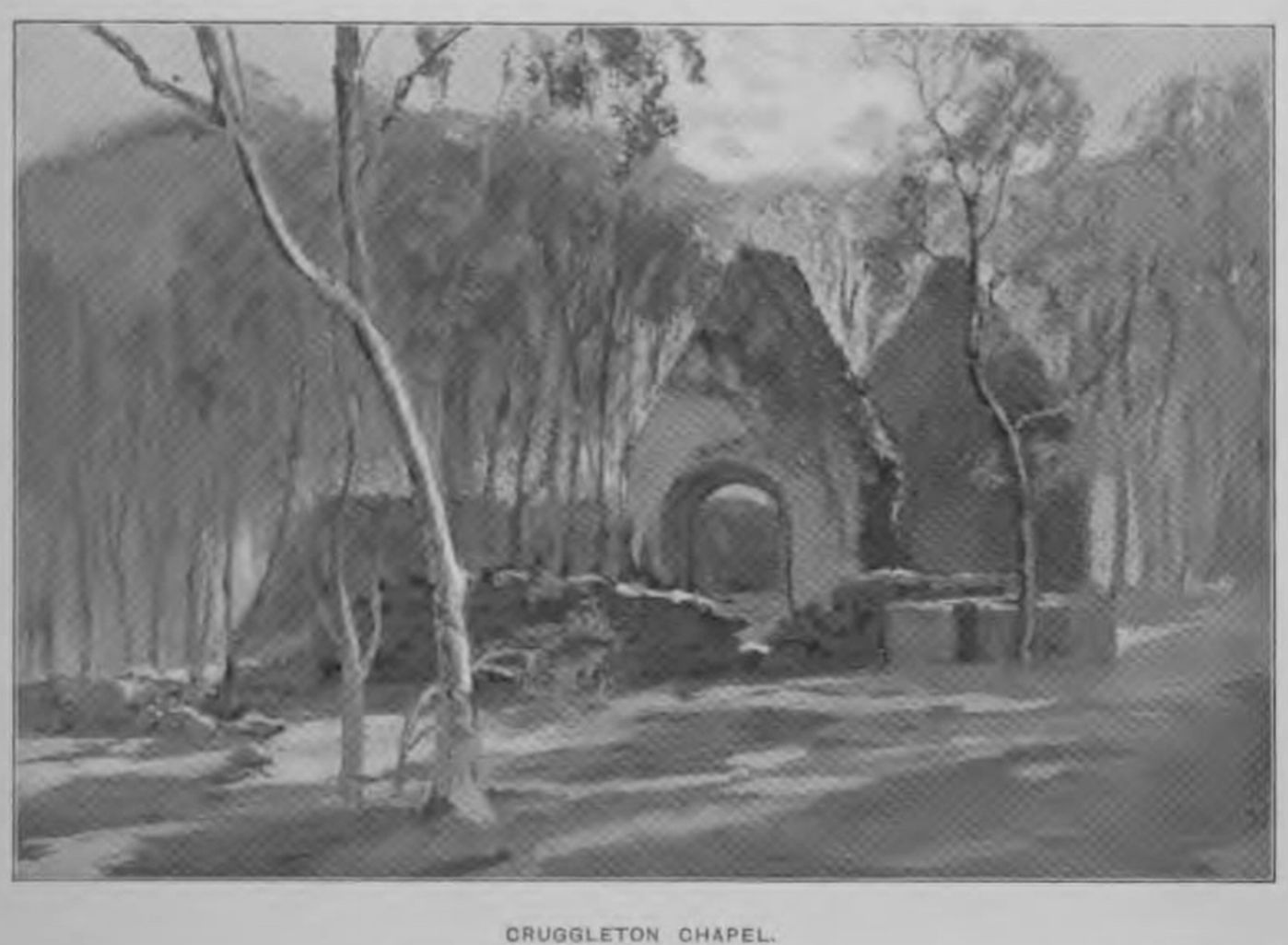
Cruggleton Chapel. 1875. by Peter Handyside MacKerlie

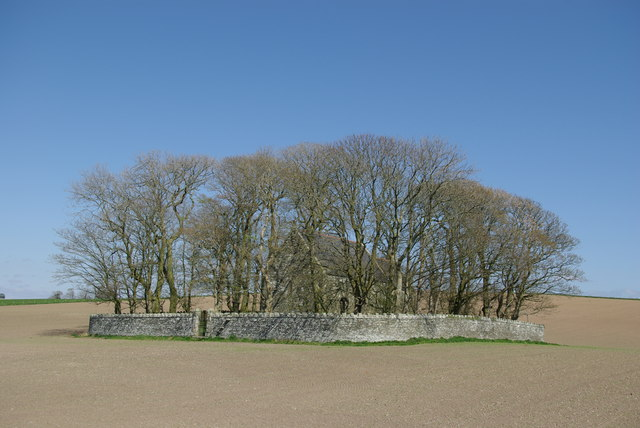
restored 12th century Cruggleton Church afterwards Sorbie Church.

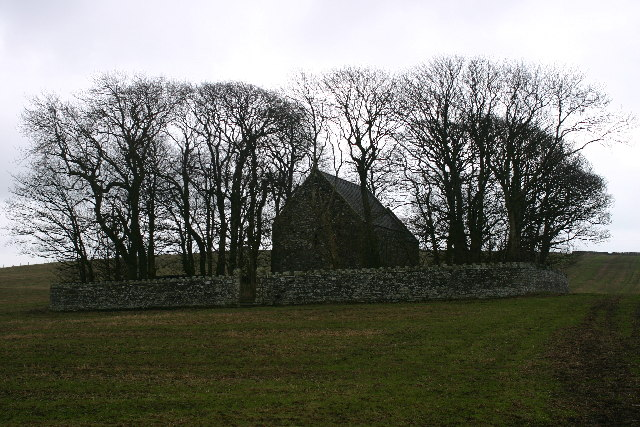
restored Cruggleton Church afterwards Sorbie Church.

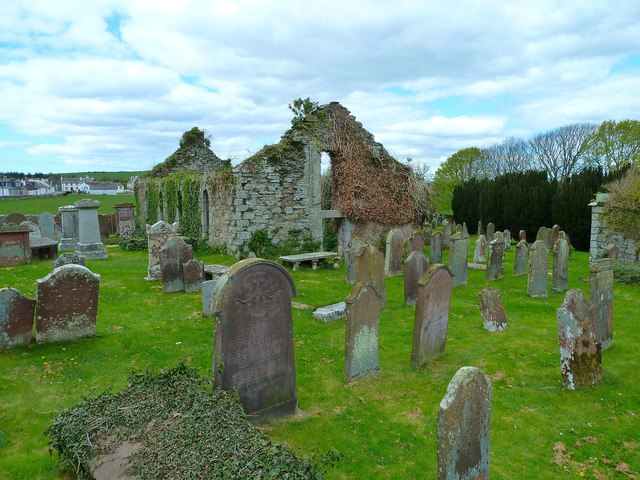
Sorbie, old Parish Church ruin.

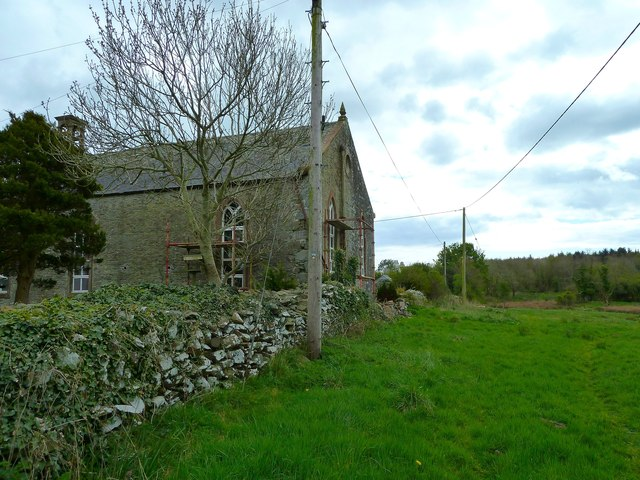
Sorbie, restored church.

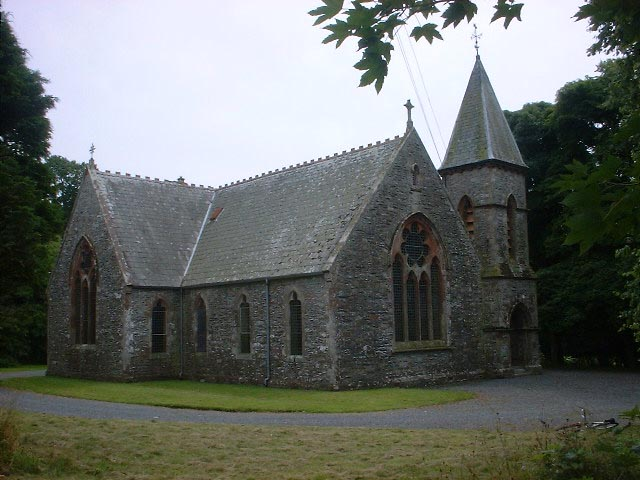
Sorbie Parish Church.

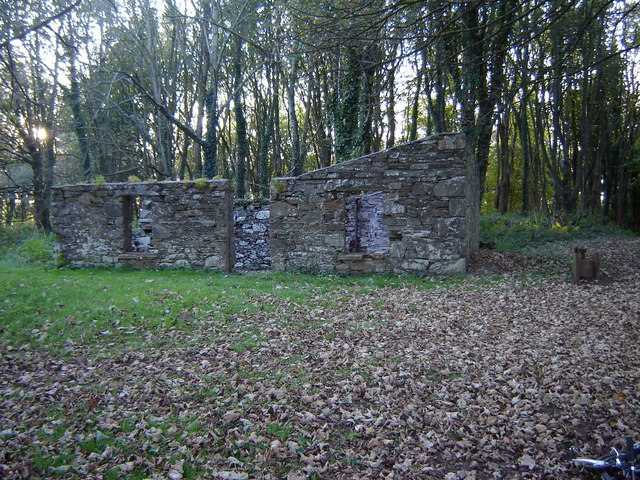
Carswell Village.

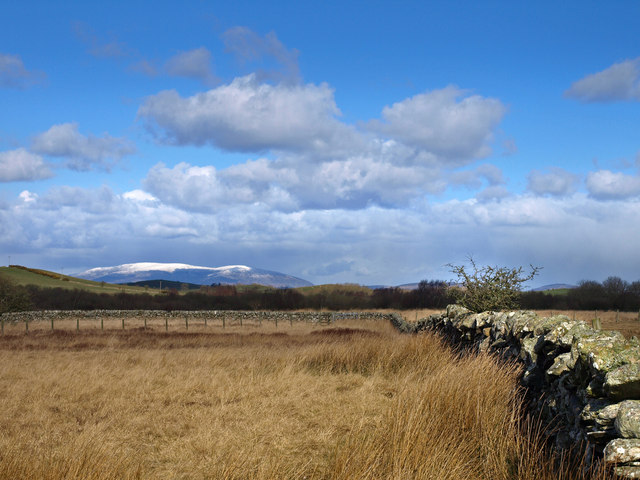
Site of Dowalton (Longcastle) Loch.

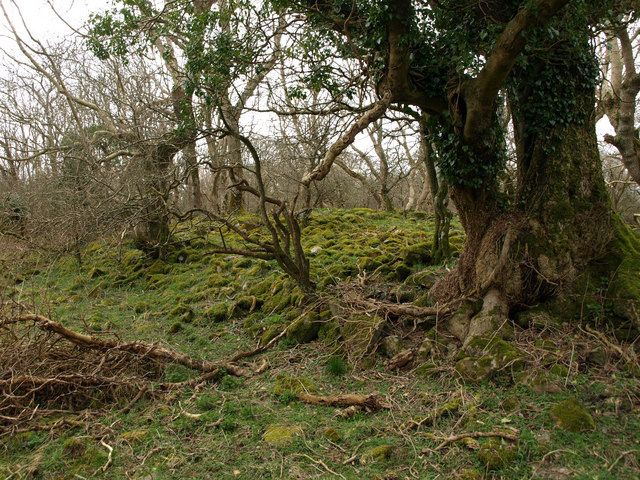
Dwelling site in Sorbie, Dowalton Loch.

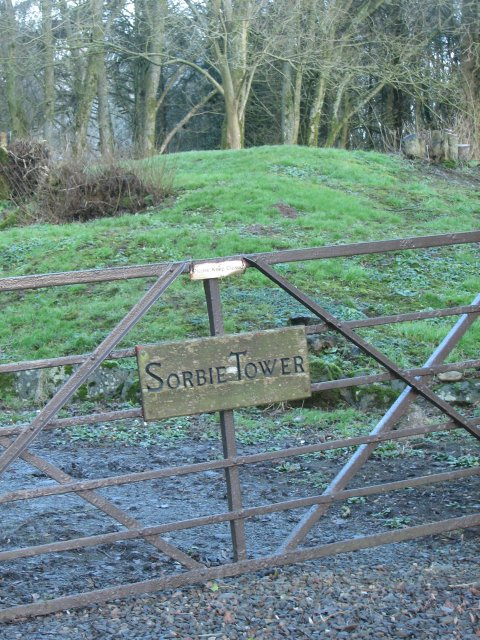
Motte at Sorbie tower.

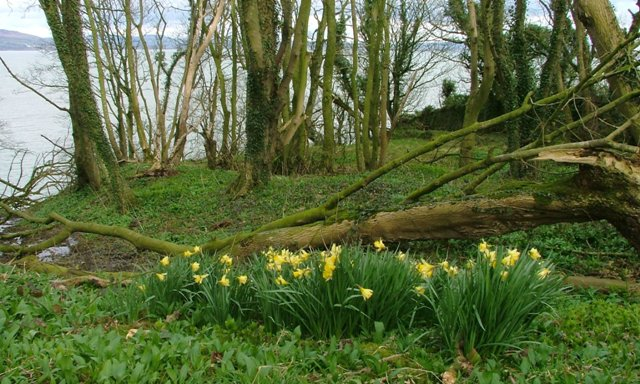
Eggerness Castle.

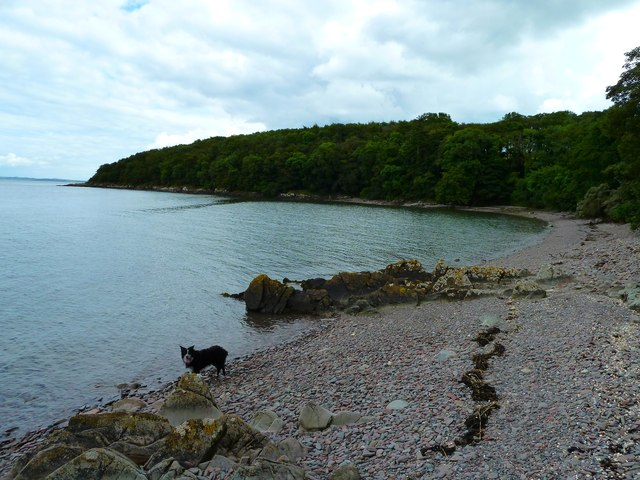
Innerwell Port.

== See also ==
- List of listed buildings in Sorbie, Dumfries and Galloway
