= Whauphill railway station =

Former railway station in Scotland

Coordinates: 54.8181°N 4.4850°W

Whauphill
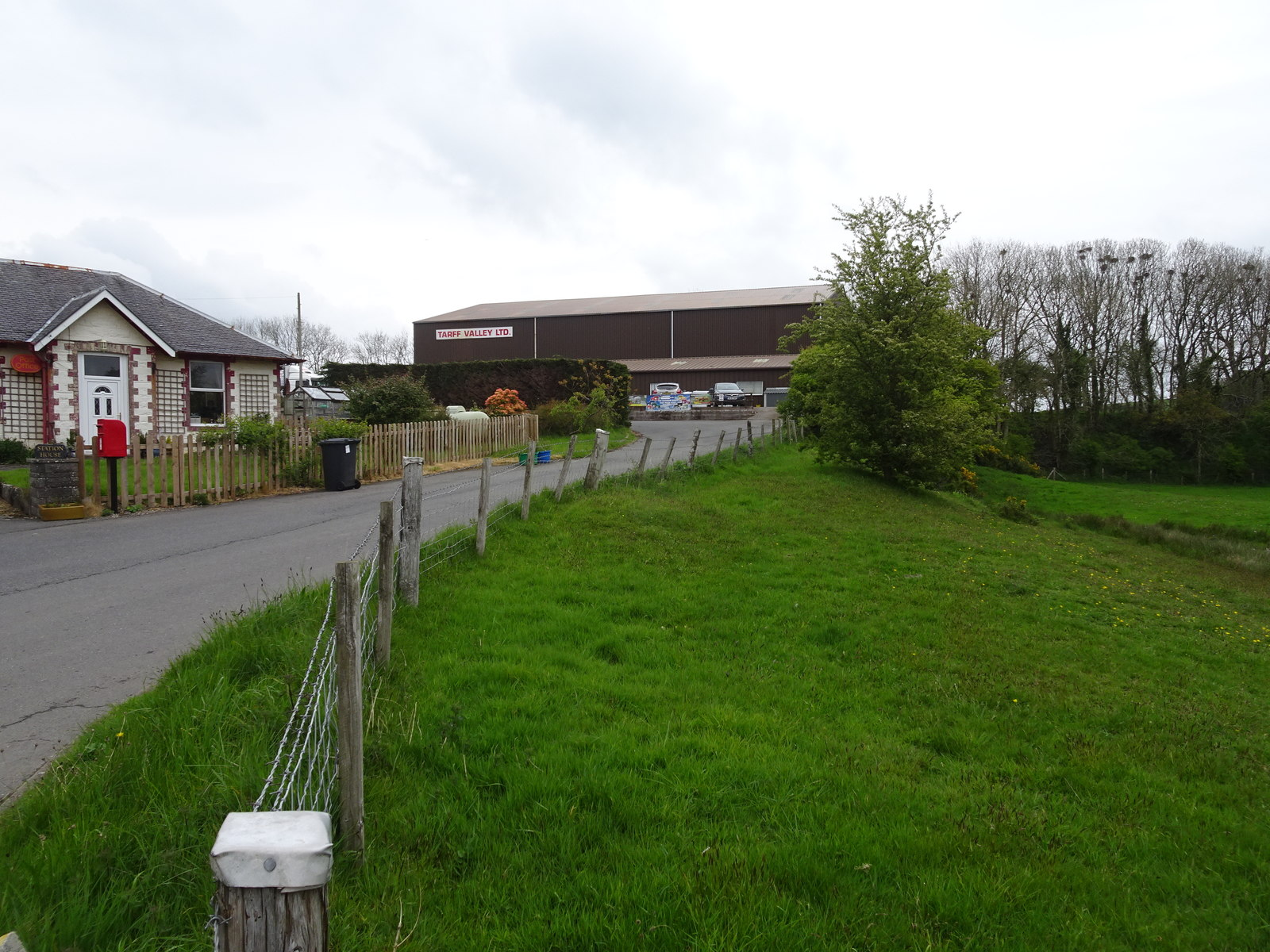
- The site of the station in 2019

General information
- Location: Wigtown, Wigtownshire; Scotland

Other information
- Status: Disused

History
- Original company: Wigtownshire Railway
- Pre-grouping: Caledonian, Glasgow & South Western, Midland and London North Western Railways

Key dates
- 2 August 1875: Opened
- 25 September 1950: Closed to passengers
- 5 October 1964: Line closed completely
Location

Whauphill (NX 40462 49887) was a railway station on the Wigtownshire Railway branch line, from Newton Stewart to Whithorn, of the Portpatrick and Wigtownshire Joint Railway. It served a rural area in Wigtownshire. Whauphill is a small rural village with Wigtown situated some 5 miles east of the village.

== History ==
The Portpatrick and Wigtownshire Joint Railway was formed from the amalgamation of two railway companies: The Portpatrick Railway and the Wigtownshire Railway, which got into financial difficulties; they merged and were taken over.

A station master's house was provided. In the 1880s Whauphill had a post and telegraph office. The station had a passing loop, a signal box located on the platform, and a goods shed.

== Other stations ==
- Newton Stewart - junction
- Causewayend
- Mains of Penninghame
- Wigtown
- Kirkinner
- Sorbie
- Millisle
  - Garlieston
- Broughton Skeog
- Whithorn

== See also ==
- List of closed railway stations in Britain

Preceding station	Historical railways	Following station
Kirkinner; Line and station closed	Portpatrick and Wigtownshire Joint Railway	Sorbie; Line and station closed
