= Wigtown railway station =

Former railway station in Scotland

Coordinates: 54.8636°N 4.4408°W

Wigtown

General information
- Location: Wigtown, Wigtownshire; Scotland

Other information
- Status: Disused

History
- Original company: Wigtownshire Railway
- Pre-grouping: Caledonian, Glasgow & South Western, Midland and London North Western Railways

Key dates
- December 1877: Opened
- 25 September 1950: Closed to passengers
- 5 October 1964: Line closed completely
Location

Wigtown was a railway station on the Wigtownshire Railway branch line, from Newton Stewart to Whithorn, of the Portpatrick and Wigtownshire Joint Railway. It served a rural area in Wigtownshire. The station closed for passengers in 1950, and to goods in 1964.

== History ==
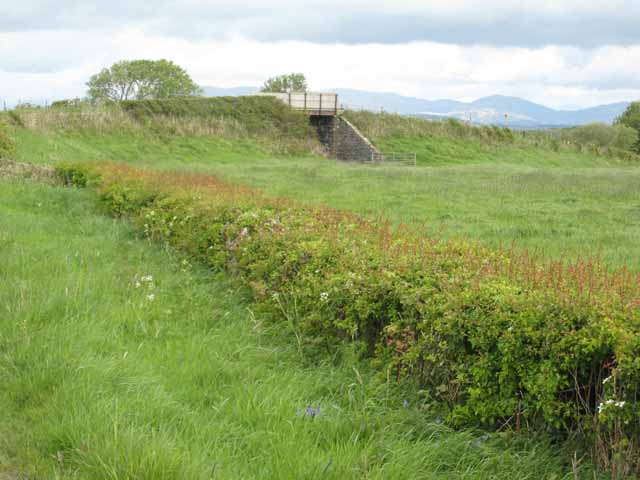
Old railway overbridge near Wigtown.

The Portpatrick and Wigtownshire Joint Railway was formed from the amalgamation of two railway companies: The Portpatrick Railway and the Wigtownshire Railway, which got into financial difficulties; they merged and were taken over.

The single-platform station stood off the Harbour Road. It had a ticket office and waiting room, a stationmaster's house that still survives (datum 2013), a goods shed, a weighing machine, passing loop, crane, and several sidings.

== Site today ==
The stationmaster's house is extant along with the road bridge which ran over the railway. At the station nothing survives except for a section of platform, partially infilled.

== Other stations ==
- Newton Stewart - junction
- Causewayend
- Mains of Penninghame
- Kirkinner
- Whauphill
- Sorbie
- Millisle
  - Garlieston
- Broughton Skeog
- Whithorn
- List of closed railway stations in Britain

Preceding station	Historical railways	Following station
Causewayend; Line and station closed	Portpatrick and Wigtownshire Joint Railway	Kirkinner; Line and station closed
