= Sorbie railway station =

Former railway station in Scotland

Coordinates: 54.7984°N 4.4357°W

Sorbie
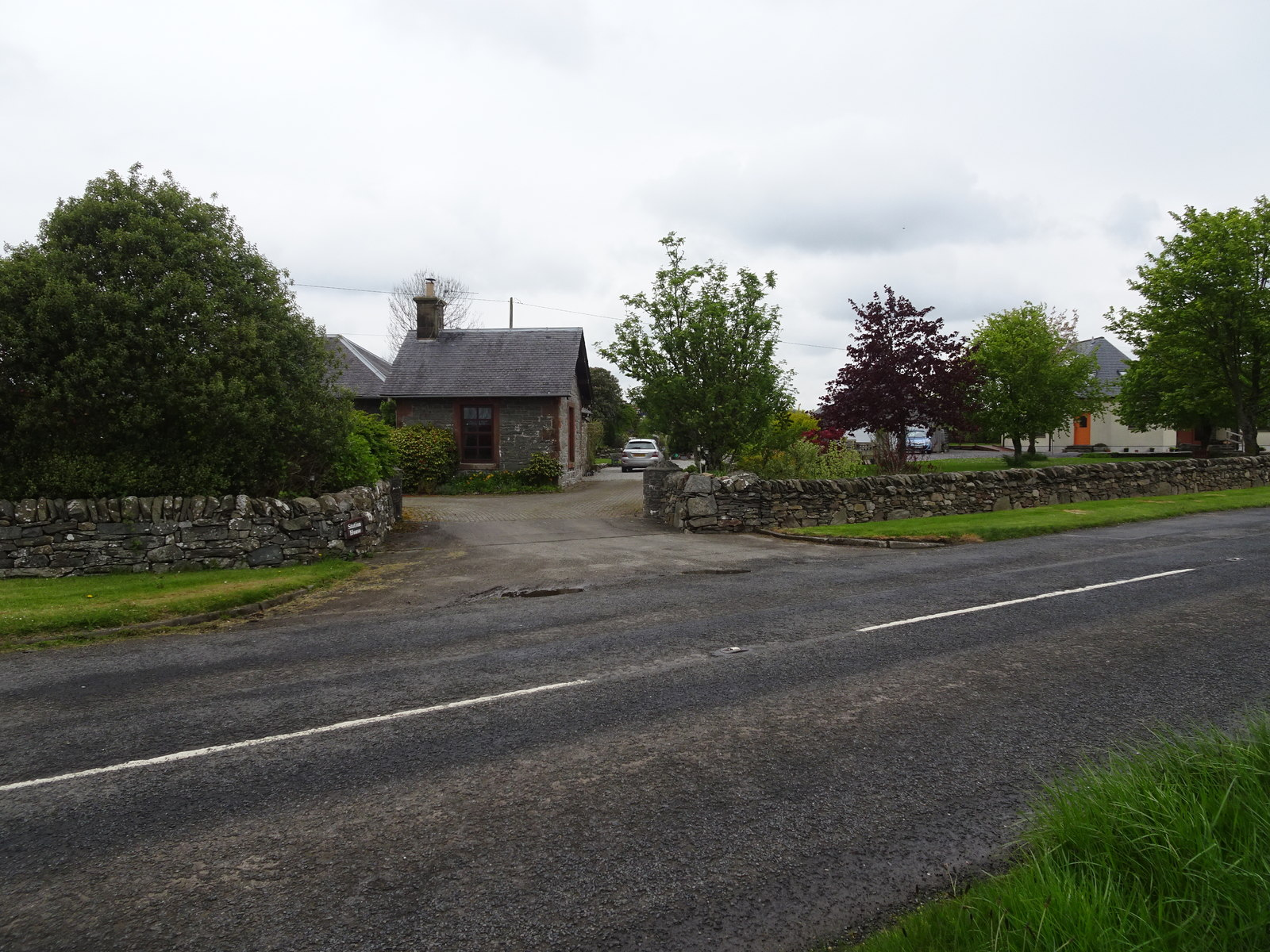
- The site of the station in 2019

General information
- Location: Sorbie, Wigtownshire; Scotland

Other information
- Status: Disused

History
- Original company: Wigtownshire Railway
- Pre-grouping: Caledonian, Glasgow & South Western, Midland and London North Western Railways

Key dates
- 2 August 1875: Opened
- 25 September 1950: Closed to passengers
- 1964: Line closed completely
Location

Sorbie (NX4351447562) was a railway station that was located close to the village of Sorbie on the then Wigtownshire Railway branch line to Whithorn, from Newton Stewart, later becoming the Portpatrick and Wigtownshire Joint Railway. It served a very rural district in Wigtownshire, however it lay next to a creamery, a waulk mill and Creech Mill. The station closed for passengers in 1950, and the line closed to goods in 1964.

== History ==
The nearby road was diverted via an overbridge and the single platformed station with signalbox, ticket office, etc. built on its old course. The single track line had a passing loop and a single siding beside a loading dock with a weighing machine present in 1895 and 1906. The original station was rebuilt after a fire in 1880 by the Wigtownshire Railway. The stationmaster's house and station building still survive as private dwellings (datum 2013).

The Sorbie creamery was built opposite the station in 1892, and until 1991 it produced cheddar cheese when all local cheese production was concentrated at Stranraer. At a siding near the station, a small slaughterhouse operated, sending lamb as carcases for the Smithfield market in London. Meat or milk could be put on the train in the early evening to be in London, Liverpool, or Newcastle next morning.

== Other stations ==
- Newton Stewart - junction
- Causewayend
- Mains of Penninghame
- Wigtown
- Kirkinner
- Whauphill
- Millisle
  - Garlieston
- Broughton Skeog
- Whithorn
- List of closed railway stations in Britain

| Preceding station | Historical railways | Following station |
|---|---|---|
| Whauphill; Line and station closed | Caledonian, Glasgow & South Western, Midland and London North Western Railways; Portpatrick and Wigtownshire Joint Railway | Millisle; Line and station closed |
