= Millisle railway station =

Railway station in Dumfries and Galloway, Scotland

Coordinates: 54.7884°N 4.3916°W

Millisle Millisle for Garlieston
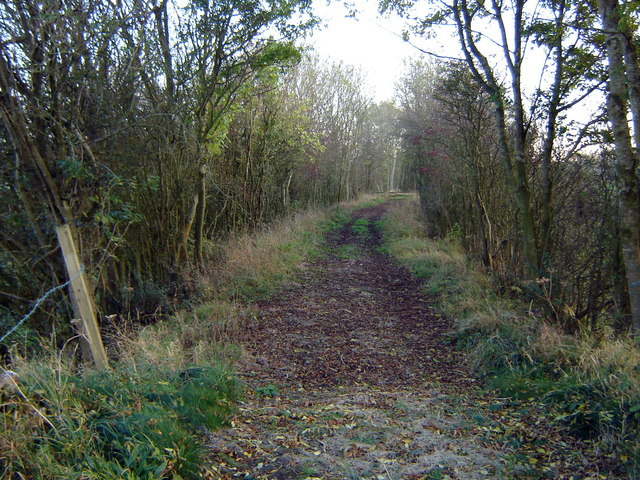
- The old railway near Millisle Station

General information
- Location: Garlieston, Wigtownshire; Scotland
- Grid reference: NX463463

Other information
- Status: Disused

History
- Original company: Wigtownshire Railway
- Pre-grouping: Caledonian, Glasgow & South Western, Midland and London North Western Railways

Key dates
- 1 March 1903: Opened
- 25 September 1950: Closed to passengers
- 1964: closed completely
Location

Millisle, later Millisle for Garlieston was a railway station that was near the junction for Garlieston on the Wigtownshire Railway branch line, from Newton Stewart to Whithorn, of the Portpatrick and Wigtownshire Joint Railway. It served a rural area in Wigtownshire. The line was closed to passenger services in 1950, and to goods in 1964.

== History ==
The station replaced Garliestontown that lay to the north and opened as a terminus in 1876. A shed was located there which was a combined goods shed and engine shed. A passing loop was present and a single platform at the station.

Regular passenger services ceased on the Garlieston branch on 1 March 1903; Millisle was then renamed as Millisle for Garlieston.

The station master's house survives as a private dwelling named Kilfillan Croft.

== Other stations ==
- Newton Stewart - junction
- Causewayend
- Mains of Penninghame
- Wigtown
- Kirkinner
- Whauphill
- Sorbie
  - Garlieston
- Broughton Skeog
- Whithorn

| Preceding station | Historical railways | Following station |
|---|---|---|
| Sorbie; Line and station closed | Caledonian, Glasgow & South Western, Midland and London North Western Railways; Portpatrick and Wigtownshire Joint Railway | Garlieston; Line and station closed |
| Sorbie; Line and station closed | Caledonian, Glasgow & South Western, Midland and London North Western Railways; Portpatrick and Wigtownshire Joint Railway | Broughton Skeog; Line and station closed |
