= Kirkinner railway station =

Former railway station in Scotland

Coordinates: 54.835356°N 4.460342°W

Kirkinner
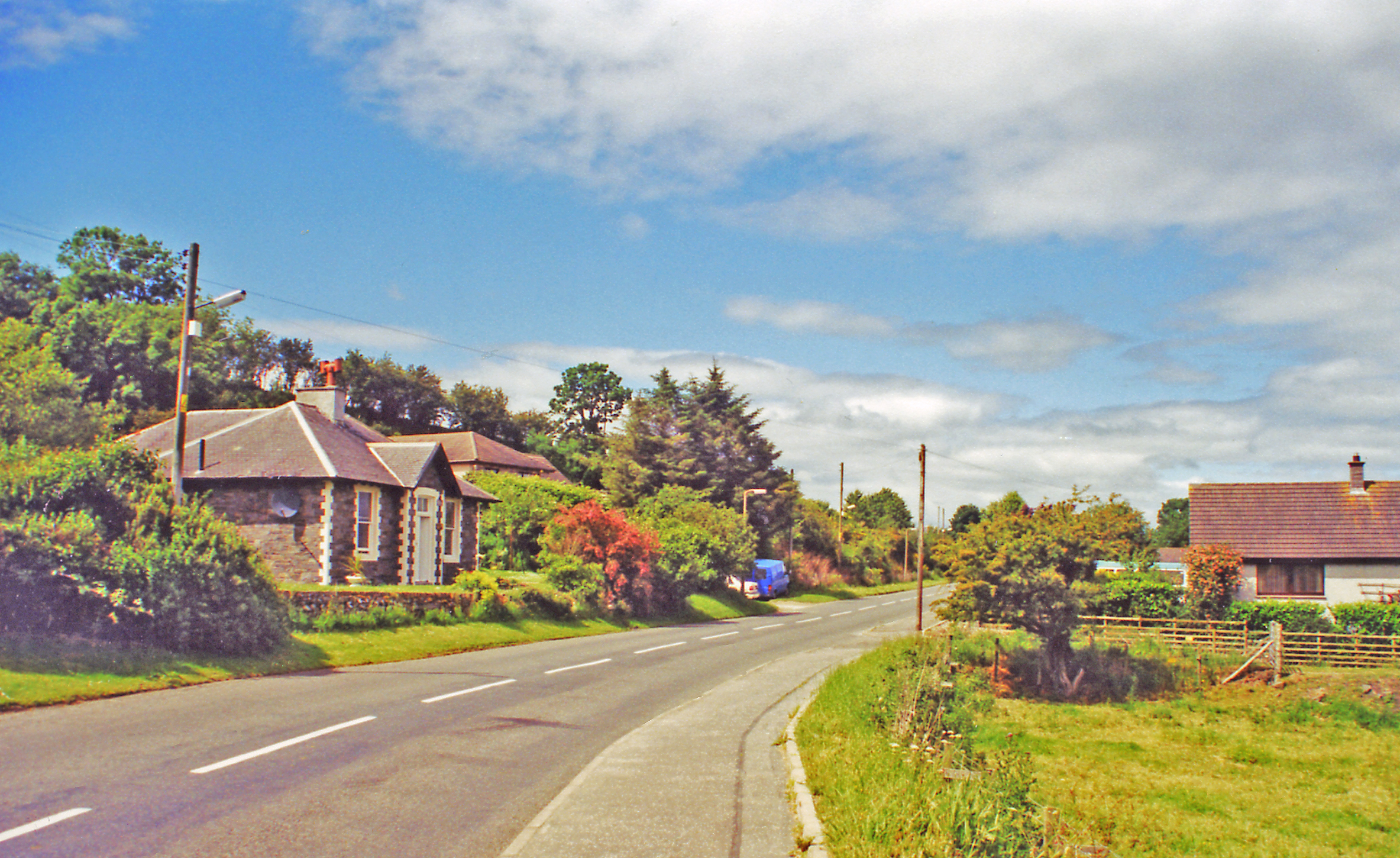
- Site of the station in 2000

General information
- Location: Wigtown, Dumfries and Galloway; Scotland
- Grid reference: NX420517

Other information
- Status: Disused

History
- Original company: Wigtownshire Railway
- Pre-grouping: Portpatrick and Wigtownshire Joint Railway
- Post-grouping: London, Midland and Scottish Railway

Key dates
- 2 August 1875: Station opened
- 25 September 1950: Station closed
Location

Kirkinner was a railway station on the Wigtownshire Railway branch line, from Newton Stewart to Whithorn, of the Portpatrick and Wigtownshire Joint Railway. It served a rural area in Wigtownshire. Kirkinner is an area and village, 3 miles from Wigtown, bounded on the east by the bay of Wigtown, along which it extends for about three miles, and on the north by the River Bladnoch.

== History ==
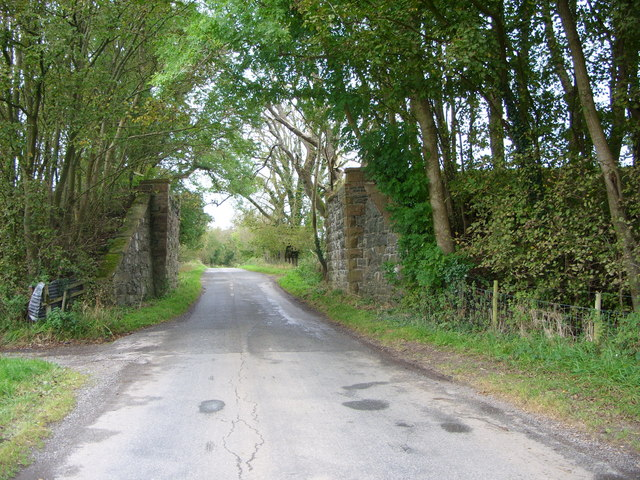
Dismantled overbridge near Kirkinner

The Portpatrick and Wigtownshire Joint Railway was formed from the amalgamation of two railway companies: The Portpatrick Railway and the Wigtownshire Railway, which got into financial difficulties; they merged and were taken over.

A station master's house was provided. In 1908 the station is shown as having a passing loop, a single platform, two sidings, a weighing machine, a ticket office and waiting room, all sitting within a cutting.

== Other stations ==
- Newton Stewart - junction
- Causewayend
- Mains of Penninghame
- Wigtown
- Whauphill
- Sorbie
- Millisle
  - Garlieston
- Broughton Skeog
- Whithorn

Preceding station	Historical railways	Following station
Wigtown; Line and station closed	Portpatrick and Wigtownshire Joint Railway	Whauphill; Line and station closed

== See also ==
- List of closed railway stations in Britain
