= Penninghame =

Coordinates: 54.9579°N 4.4853°W

- Location within Dumfries and Galloway
- Council area: Dumfries and Galloway
- Lieutenancy area: Wigtown (Wigtownshire)
- Country: Scotland
- Sovereign state: United Kingdom
- Police: Scotland
- Fire: Scottish
- Ambulance: Scottish
- UK Parliament: Dumfries and Galloway
- Scottish Parliament: Galloway and Upper Nithsdale

Penninghame in Wigtownshire, Dumfries and Galloway, Scotland, is a civil parish area, 8 miles (N. W.) from Wigtown. The area is approx 16 miles in length, and from 5 to 6 miles' width, bounded on the north and east by the River Cree, and on the west by the Bladnoch; comprising nearly 38,000 acres, of which 12,000 were arable, 600 woodland and plantations, 1600 meadow, and the remainder hill pasture, moorland, moss, etc.

The civil parish area of Penninghame is bounded on the south by the civil parish area of Wigtown and on the west by Kirkcowan on the north by the civil parish area of Colmonell and on the east by the civil parish area of Minnigaff.

There are numerous nature trails nearby, managed on behalf of the state by Forest Enterprise.

== Etymology ==
Penninghame (spelled Peningham in 1287 in Bagimonds Roll) has been argued to be one of the earliest Anglo-Saxon place-names in south-west Scotland. Hough has proposed that it is derived either from Old English *pening-hām 'farm on which a penny geld was payable' or *pen-ingahām, the second element of which means 'homestead of the followers of...' or 'homestead of the settlers at...'. She argues against a derivation from -ingahām based on the geographical isolation of Penninghame from the other -ingahām names in southern Scotland (Coldingham, Tynninghame and Whittingeham); the lack of medial ⟨a⟩ in the early spellings of the name; and the obscure first element 'Pen'.

James proposes that the first element is Brittonic penn 'head; top, summit, end' incorporated into an Old English ing + ham name. It would mean 'landholding named (after) *Penn'. He suggests that *Penn refers to the end of the ridge on Bar Hill. James notes that Hough's etymology of a name "implying monetary assessment of a landholding" in the 8th century would be exceptional.

== The Village of Penninghame ==
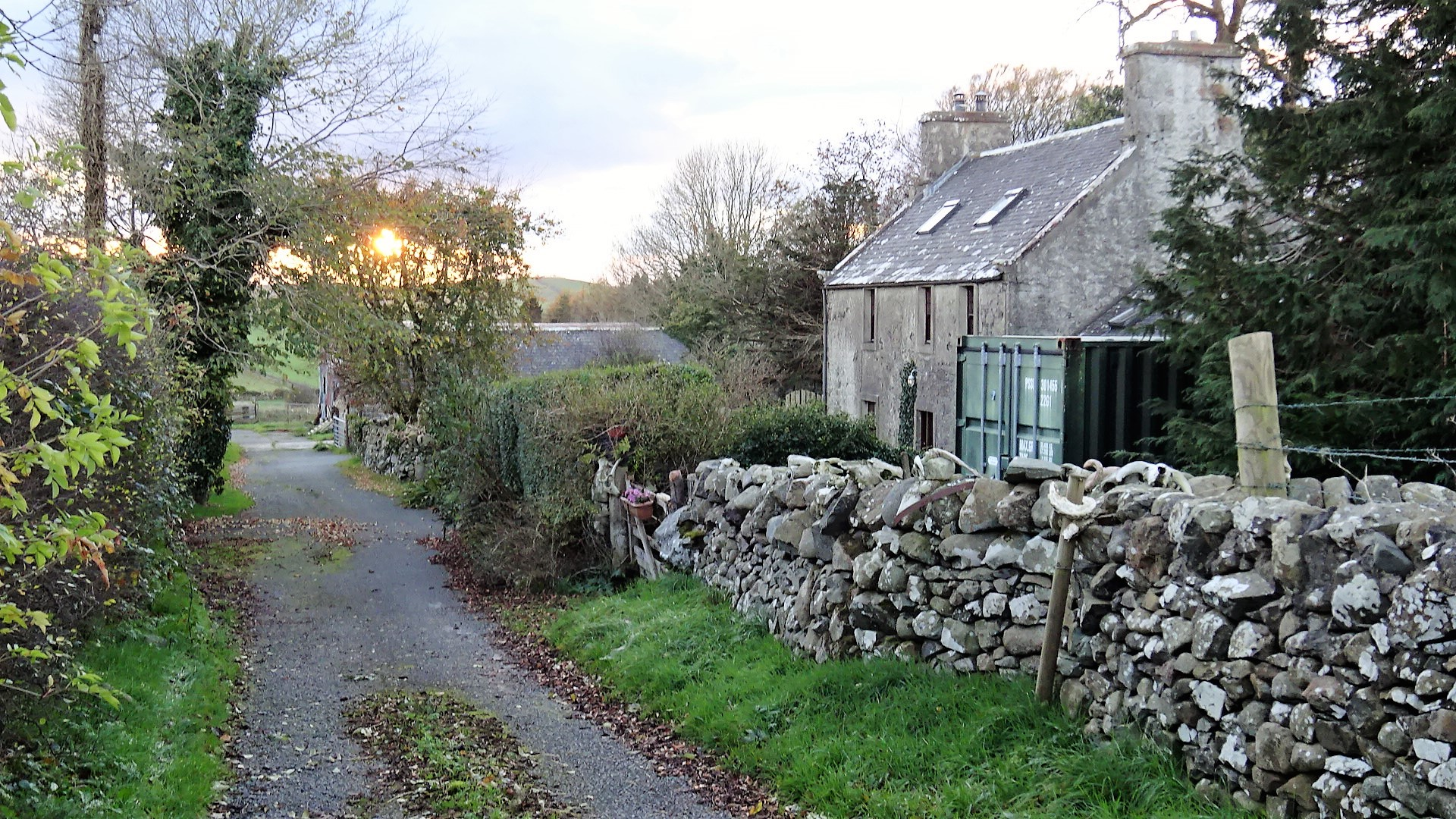
A view of the Clachan of Penninghame.

The Clachan (Village) of Penninghame was a township which existed before Newton Stewart was built and is therefore of some antiquity as the first few houses in Newton-Stewart were built in 1677 by William Stewart. Newton Stewart was a planned village and eventually it superseded the "Clachan". Between 1875 and 1885 the clachan and district were served by a halt named Mains of Penninghame Platform on the line to Whithorn from Newton Stewart with market day trains only.

== Town of Newton Stewart ==
The Dumfries and Galloway Council Administration Office for the Machars area of Wigtownshire is in the town of Newton Stewart (Gd: Baile Ùr nan Stiùbhartach) which lies on the southern edge of the Galloway Forest Park in the Civil Parish area of Penninghame.

== The Primary School ==
There has been a school in the Penninghame area for over 100 years. Also, Merton Hall has been considerably extended and altered over the years, previously being occupied as a school.

== Penninghame Church ==
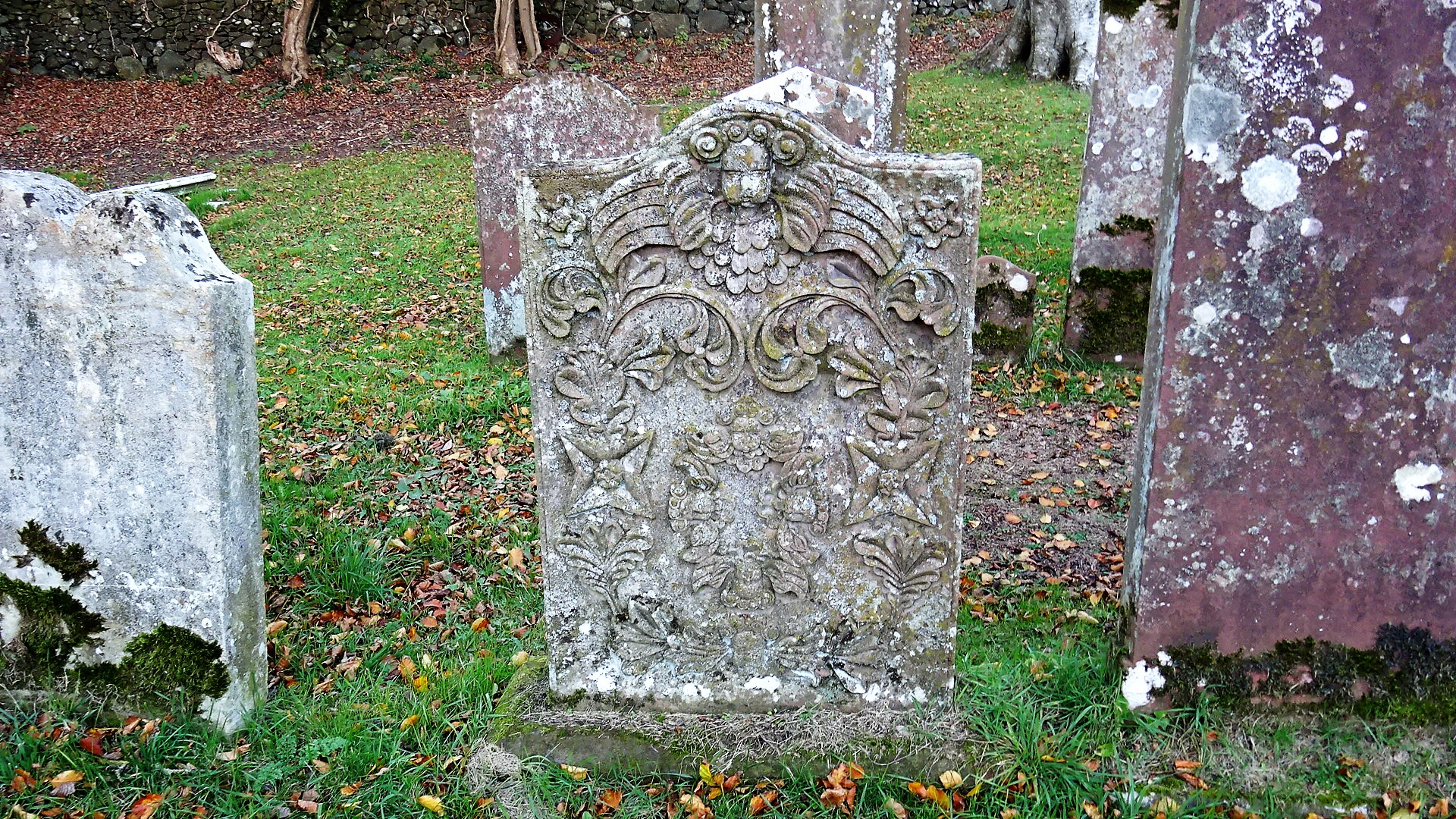
Gravestones within the Kirk of Penninghame cemetery.

The church of Penninghame belonged of old to the bishops of Galloway, who were the proprietors of Penninghame and had their chief residence at Clary, formerly called Clachary, less than a mile from the church.

The recorded history of Penninghame Parish begins with the Medieval Bishops of Galloway. The burial ground was used to 1777 when the church was closed and the new Penninghame Church was built in Newton-Stewart.

Penninghame Old Kirk and Manse in ruins at the Clachan of Penninghame are shown on Ainslie's 1782 map. The building showing in the back of the photo of the Clachan of Penninghame graveyard is said to be an old Inn. In 1877, a guide reports that the ruins of the Church were barely visible.

In the new churchyard a tombstone commemorates the Rev. Robert Rowan, minister of the parish, a friend and correspondent of the historian Robert Wodrow. Having studied at Glasgow College, he obtained licence to preach in July, 1695, and in the following year was ordained minister of Penningham (ten years after the persecution of Margaret Wilson). Taking deep concern in the affairs of the Church, he communicated to Wodrow minute accounts of the persecutions inflicted on his parishioners and others during the latter Stuart persecutions. He died on 9 August 1714, in his fifty-fifth year, and the eighteenth of his ministry.

== Barony of Merton or Myrtoun alias Frethrid ==
In 1477 James III granted a charter of Merton Hall to John Kennedy of Blairquahan.

On 1 March 1504-5 The terras et baroniam de Myretoun, cum turre, fortalicio (etc.) vic. (sheriffidom of) Wigtoun are in Registrum magni sigilli regum Scotorum AD1424-1513 (RMS) Vol. II, deed no.2829 p. 601. Also in the same volume were deeds re the Barony of Myretoun sometimes shown as "Baronium de Frethird or Frethrid, vic. (sheriffdom of) Wigtown", pp. 236–237 no. 1162; pp. 272–3 nos. 1336 & 1337 (10 Dec 1477); and no.1654. Scottish feudal barony, Scottish feudal lordship

On 27 Feb 1506 the Register of the Great Seal of Scotland records a charter p. 624 no.2943, Gawino Kennedy de Blarequhan had terres et Baronium de Frethird.

On 20 June 1508, p. 693 no.3245, Joh Kennedy de Blairquhan re Capella S. Ninian in baronia sua de Myrtoun alias Frethrid vic. Wigtoun. This St Ninian's chapel is just to the south of Glenhapple, Penningham, near Cruise of Cree and Penningham House.

10 January 1541 Barony of Martyn-Kennedy alias Frethrid, vic.(sheriffdom of) Wigtoun Gilbert Kennedy and his wife Margaret Cunninghame had these lands, recorded in R.M.S. Vol. III, p. 592 deed 2576.

Viscount Boyd of Merton, of Merton-in-Penninghame in the County of Wigtown, is a title in the Peerage of the United Kingdom. It was created in 1960 for the Conservative politician and former Secretary of State for the Colonies, Alan Lennox-Boyd, 1st Viscount Boyd of Merton. As of 2010 the title is held by his eldest son, the second Viscount, who succeeded in 1983.

A bronze axe, now in the Stranraer Museum, was found in boggy ground at Merton Hall, about 2 miles west of Newton Stewart. Merton Hall is a category B Listed Building.

== History ==
1 June 1557 - (lands of) Clarie / Clary and Over Bar had previously been leased for 19 years by Bishop Andrew Durie to Walter Stewart of Barcly, as recorded in the book "Wigtownshire Charters" (Scottish Records Society) p. 248 no.347. Also in this book, Penninghame was the usual residence of the Bishops of Galloway, Bishop Alexander Gordon of Clary died here in 1576. The 10 merkland of Grange of Penninghame, 5 merkland of Clarie, 5 merkland of Over Bar, 5 merkland of Barchelauchlyne (Barcly ?, AD1189 there was a Walter de Berchelay, chamberlain ), 5 merkland of Barquharrane, all lying in the Merse of Cree, were granted by bishop Alexander Gordon to Alexander Stewart of Garlies and Katherine Stewart spouses, and the 5 merkland of Carnestik and Polchullie (Polwillie ?) were feued to Mr. John Stewart and Egidia Gordon spouses.

Castle Stewart is north of Newton Stewart, Penninghame, Machars, Wigtownshire, Dumfries and Galloway, Scotland. Scots Peerage, Vol. IV records that Sir Alexander Stewart of Garlies and his 3rd wife, Catherine Stewart (dau of Water Stewart of Barclye / Barcly, see above) had a son, Anthony Stewart who was parson of Penningham and ancestor of Colonel William Stewart who purchased lands of Castle Stewart - formerly styled Kilcreuchie.

Colonel William Stewart bought the lands previously known as Calcruchie and built Castle Stewart. See ref. for plan of the Castle in "The Castellated and Domestic Architecture of Scotland". by David MacGibbon and Thomas Ross, pub. 1892. pp. 246–248.

All Saints Episcopal Church, Challoch, built as private chapel for Edward James Stopford-Blair of Penninghame House and consecrated 1872. Designed architects W G Habershon & Pite.

== Monument of National Importance, Penninghame ==
Skaith Mote – the site of a small timber castle of medieval date.

== Archaeology ==
The National Gallery of Scotland – Museum of Antiquities of Scotland, has - Bronze implements, (Sir Herbert Eustace Maxwell, 1885) lists (item 48) 8 × 21-inch and (item 49) 2 × 21-inch bronze axes from Penninghame.

There were between 1200 and 1500 ancient English coins found in a field in the Parish of Penningham, showing the heads of King Edward, King Alexander, etc. Some minted in Bristol may have been about AD1280.

Some places in north Penninghame which are of interest to archaeologists, artists, and walkers on the Southern Upland Way are:

- Castle Stewart (on lands of Kilcreuchie or Calcruchie) north of Newton Stewart.
- Skaithe Motte and Bailey.
- Castle Loch (Black Loch which drains into Ochiltree Loch) with Mickle Castle between both Lochs.
- Ochiltree Loch with Little or Mickle Castle on the north shore
- Ochiltree, north of Ochiltree Hill
- Loch Maberry with a castle on the eastern shore
- The Machars

== Notable residents ==
- Alexander Gordon (c. 1516–1575), Archbishop of Glasgow, Bishop of the Isles and Bishop of Galloway, born in Penninghame
- Captain Sir Murray Maxwell (1775–1831), Royal Navy officer who served during the French Revolutionary and Napoleonic Wars, born in Penninghame
- Edward Black (1793–1845), minister and teacher in Canada associated with the Church of Scotland, born in Penninghame
- James Blair (c. 1788–1841), Irish-born slave-owner and Tory MP. Bought the Penninghame estate in 1825.

== Gallery ==
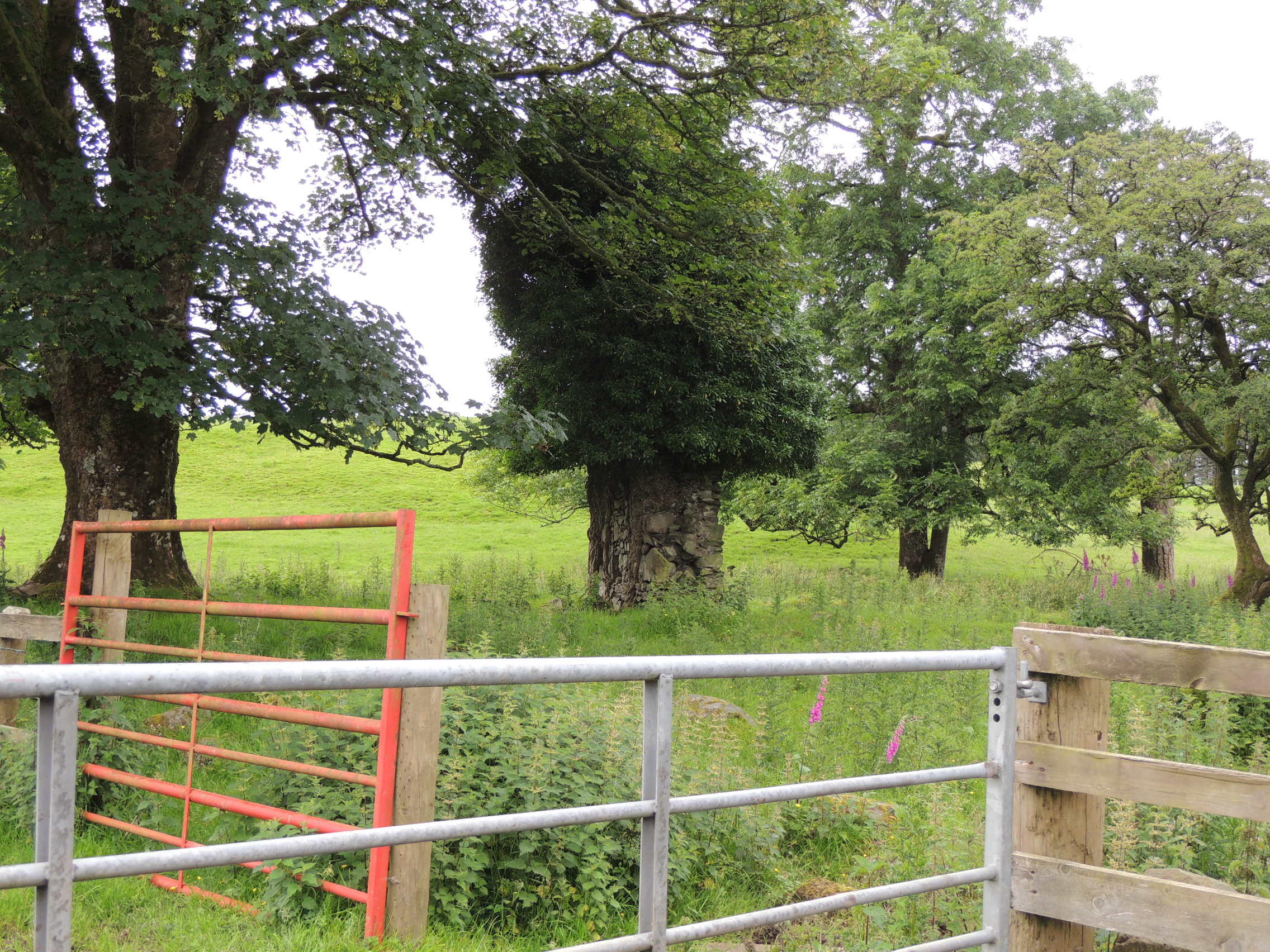
St. Ninian's chapel ruin.

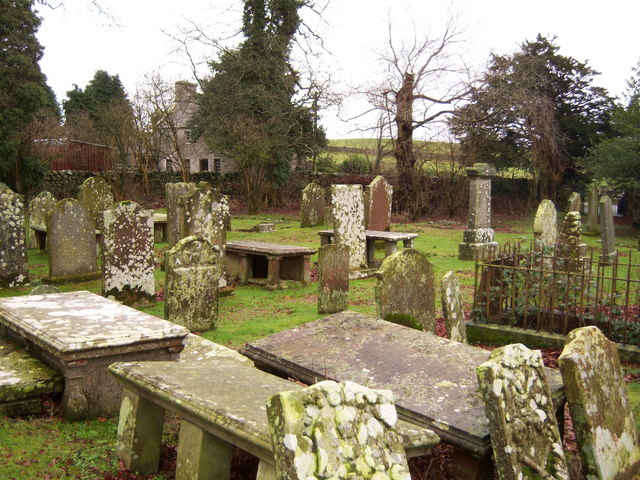
Clachan of Penninghame Cemetery.

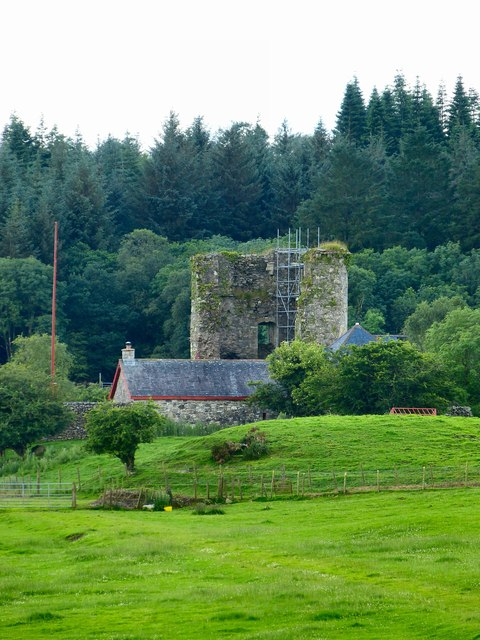
Penninghame Home Farm. View across fields to the south of the farm towards the remains of Castle Stewart

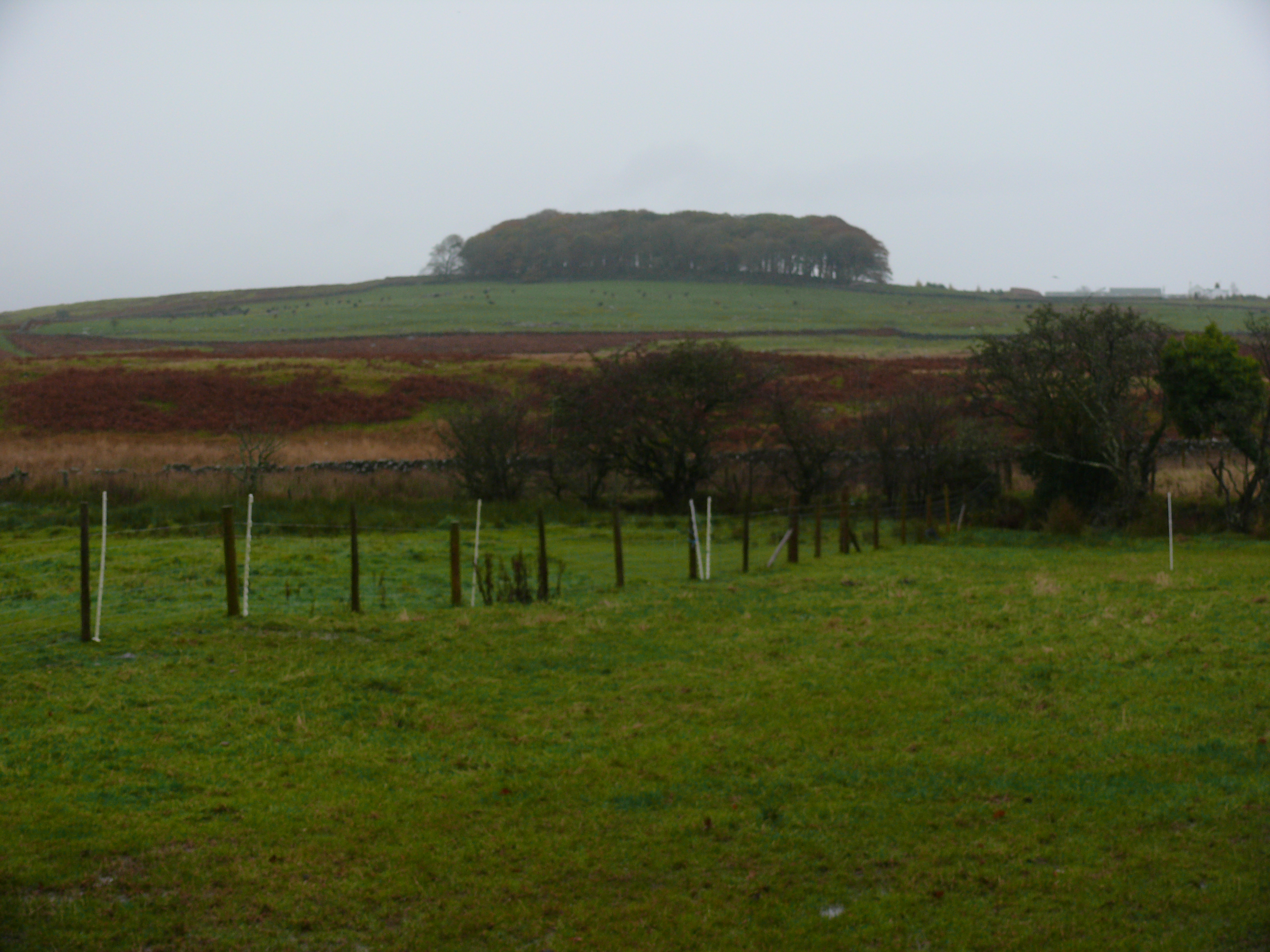
Glasnick Smithy Croft. View from near the croft along the line of the old military road towards Cairn Wood centre of photo and Barskeoch Farm on right.

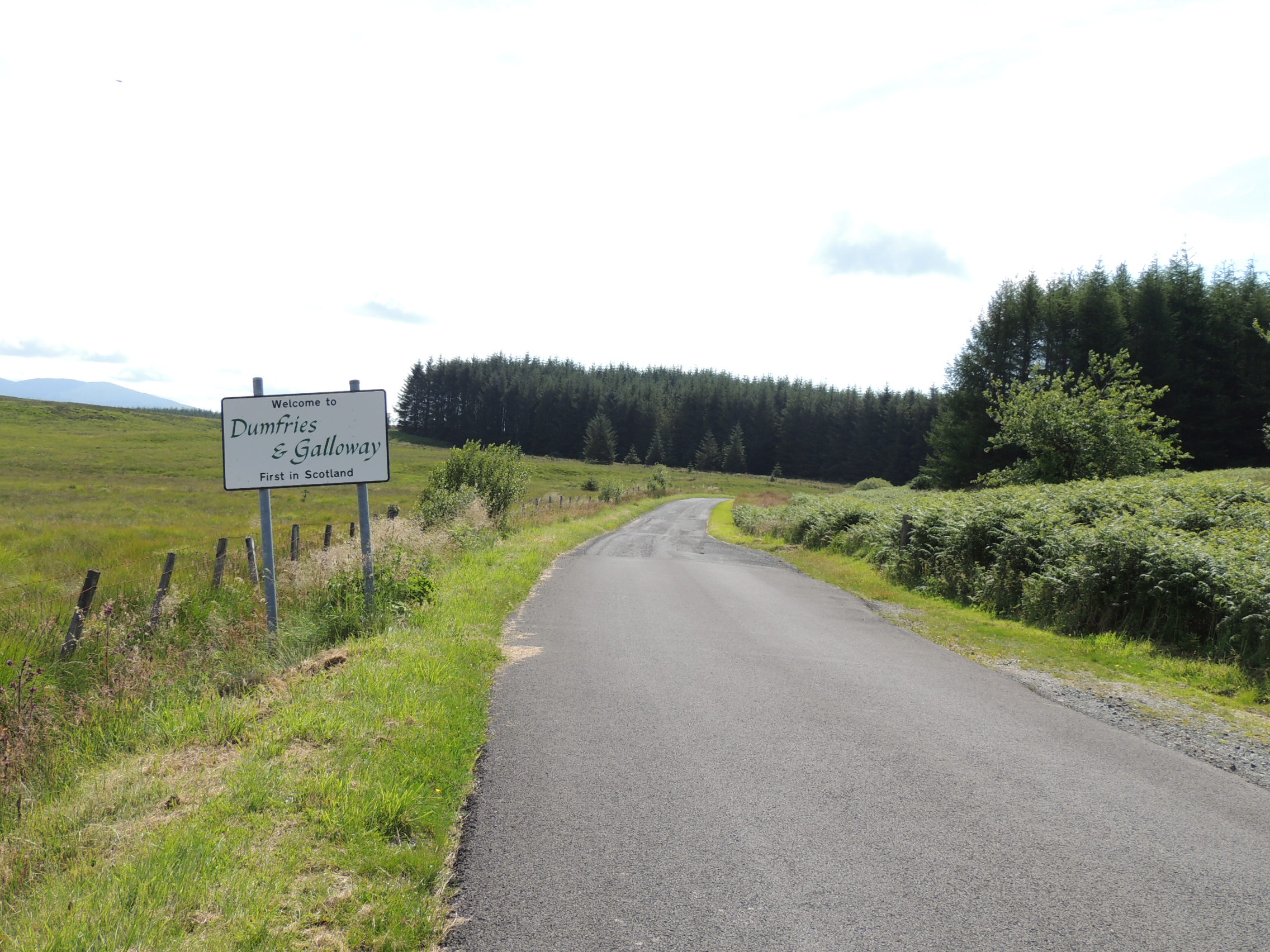
The B7027 road to Challoch, near Loch Dornal, north Penninghame area.

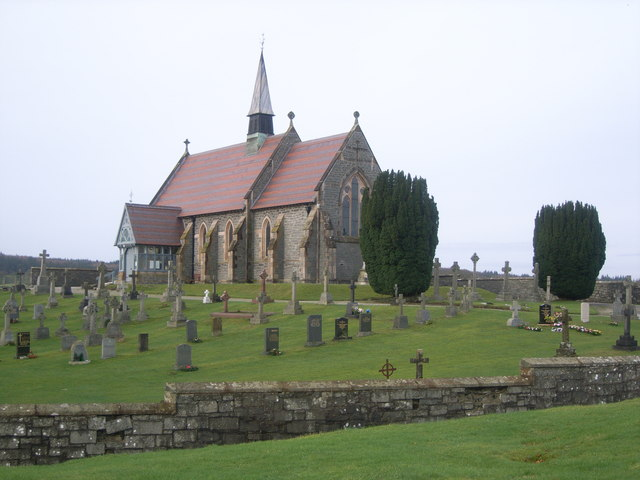
Challoch Church in Winter.

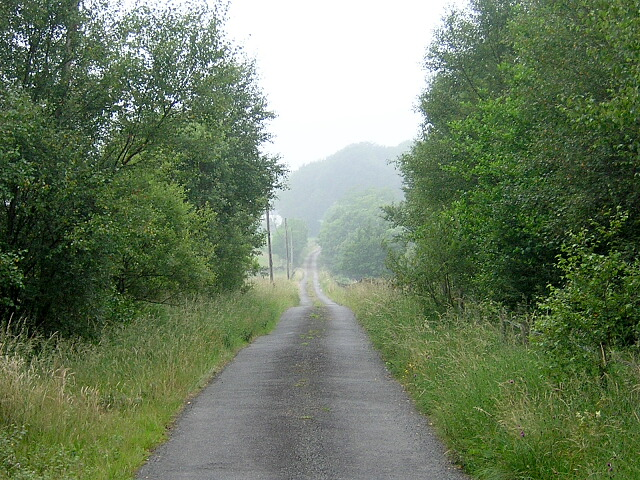
near Skaith Motte and Bailey.

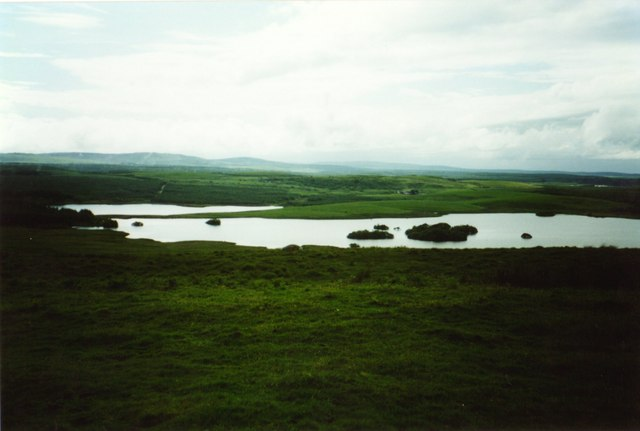
Loch Ochiltree.

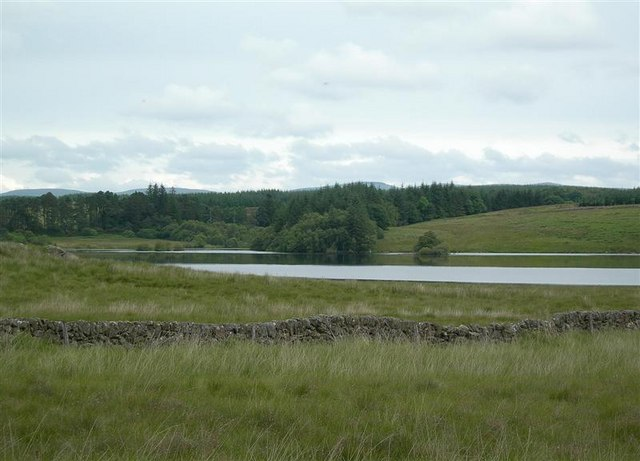
Loch Dornal.

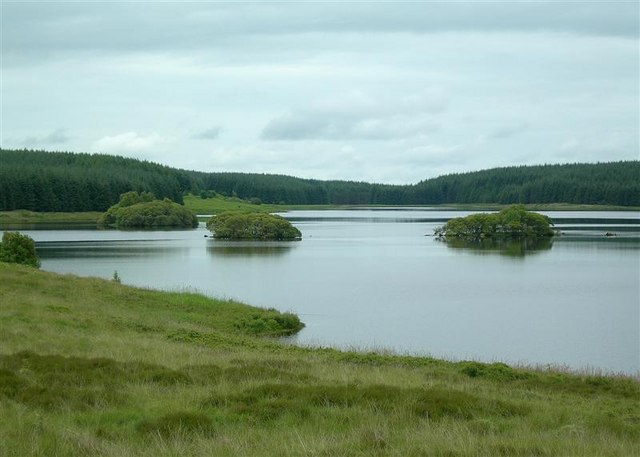
Loch Maberry near Loch Dornal.

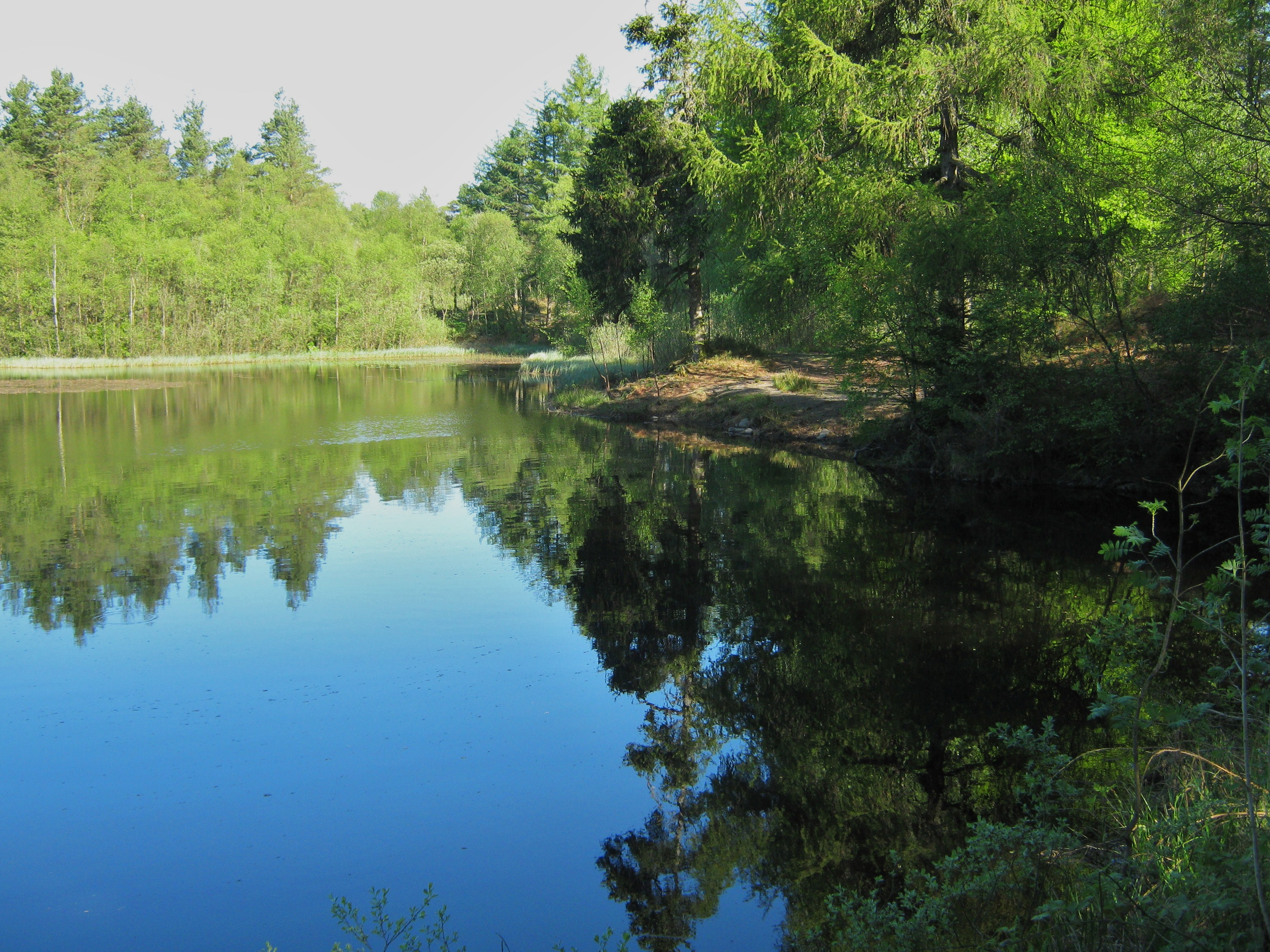
Penninghame Pond in Cruives Wood.

== See also ==
- List of listed buildings in Penninghame, Dumfries and Galloway
