= Mains of Penninghame Platform railway station =

Former railway station in Scotland

Coordinates: 54.919°N 4.480°W

Mains of Penninghame Platform
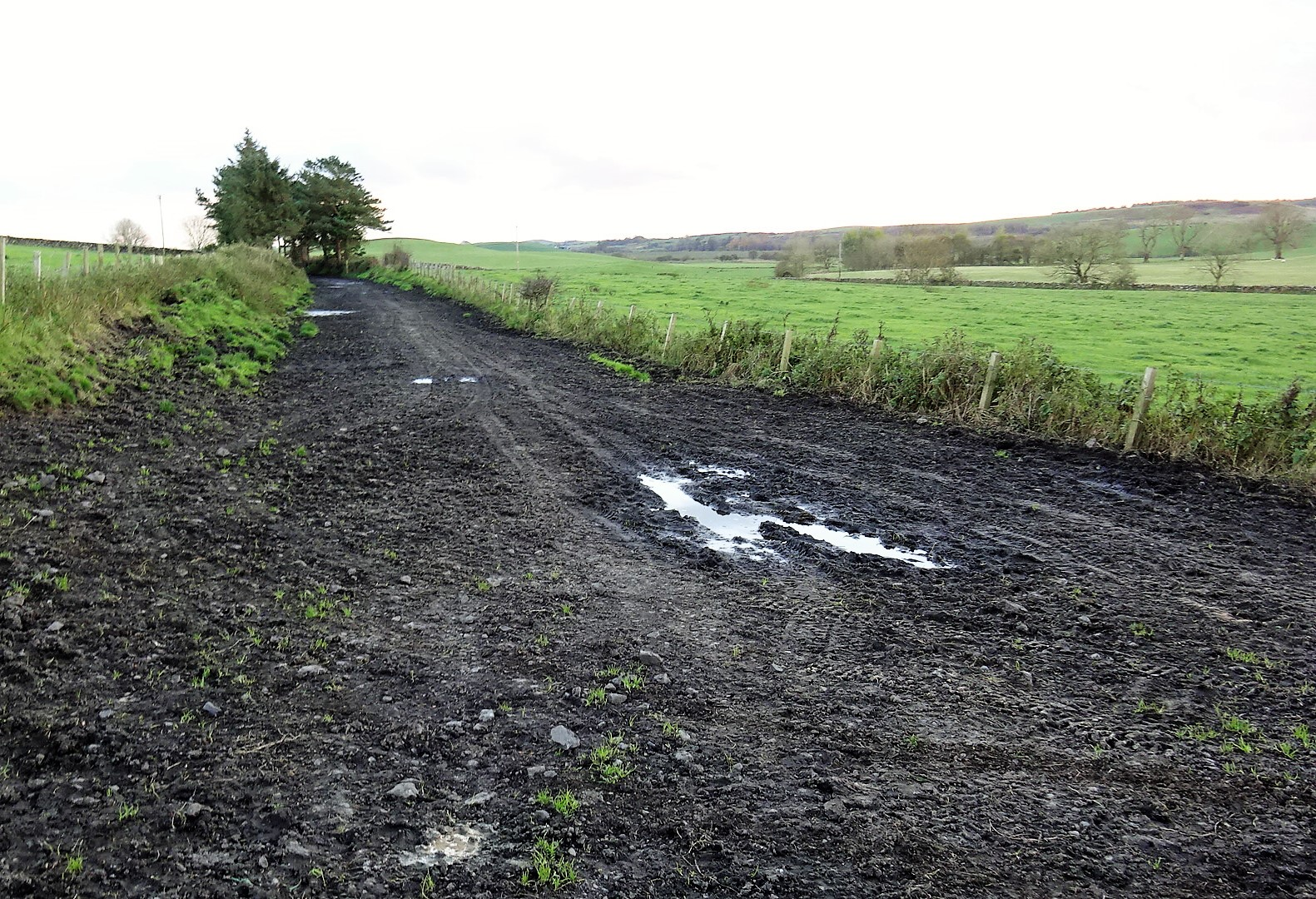
- The trackbed at the Clachan of Penninghame

General information
- Location: Newton Stewart, Wigtownshire; Scotland
- Platforms: 1

Other information
- Status: Disused

History
- Original company: Wigtownshire Railway
- Pre-grouping: Caledonian, Glasgow & South Western, Midland and London North Western Railways

Key dates
- May 1875: Opened
- 6 August 1885: Closed to passengers
- 5 October 1964: Line closed completely
Location

Mains of Penninghame Platform railway station (NX410617) was a halt on the Wigtownshire Railway branch line, from Newton Stewart to Whithorn, of the Portpatrick and Wigtownshire Joint Railway. It served a rural area of farms, including the large Mains of Penninghame and the nearby Clachan and old Kirk of Penninghame in the Parish of Penninghame, old Wigtownshire.

== History ==
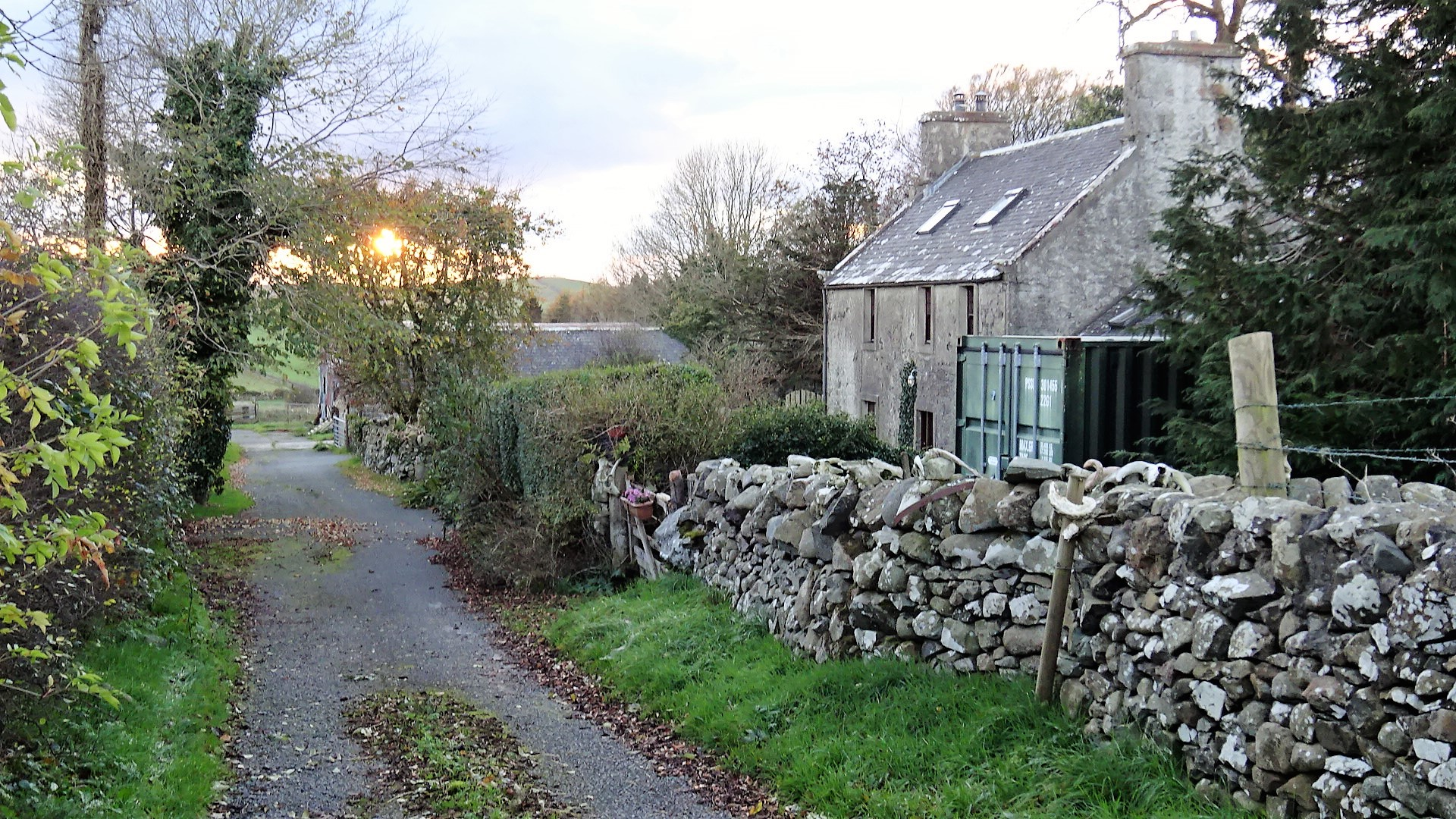
The lane from Clachan of Penninghame to the Mains of Penninghame

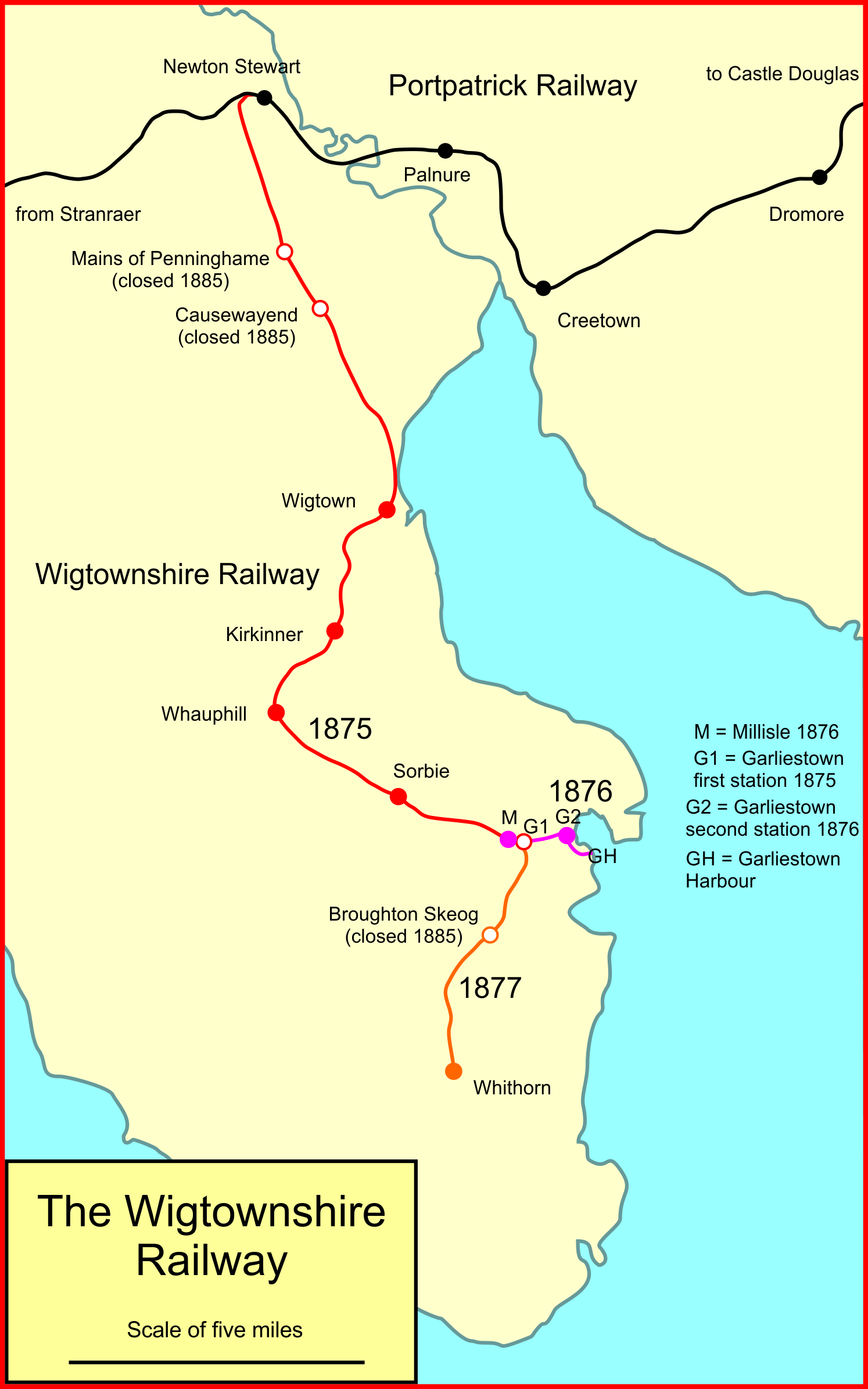
System map of the Wigtownshire Railway

The Portpatrick Railway and the Wigtownshire Railway amalgamated to become the Portpatrick and Wigtownshire Joint Railway following financial difficulties.

The line between Newton Stewart and Wigtown had no intermediate stops at first however in May 1875 it was decided to locate platforms or halts at Causeway End and Mains of Penninghame. The single platformed station stood on a typical single track section of the branch. Ordnance Survey maps do not clearly indicate the exact location however a map of 1882 gives the name 'Mains Cross Station' and a site to the north of the old kirk where the embankment crosses the Mains of Penninghame Road. A site next to the old Kirk of Penninghame on the route to Mains of Penninghame was close to the Clachan of Penninghame, its farm and public house. No sidings were present however a level crossing is recorded here that may have replaced the road underpass.

Causeway End and Mains of Penninghame had a very limited service with a train only on Fridays at 10.20 a.m. and 4.20 p.m., the Newton Stewart market day, an arrangement that was not that unusual, for example Racks railway station in Dumfries and Galloway from 1848 to 1860 had a Wednesday only service.

A rail overbridge still stands on the old trackbed on the route to Newton Stewart and the line crossed the Mains of Penninghame Road on a high embankment.

== Microhistory ==
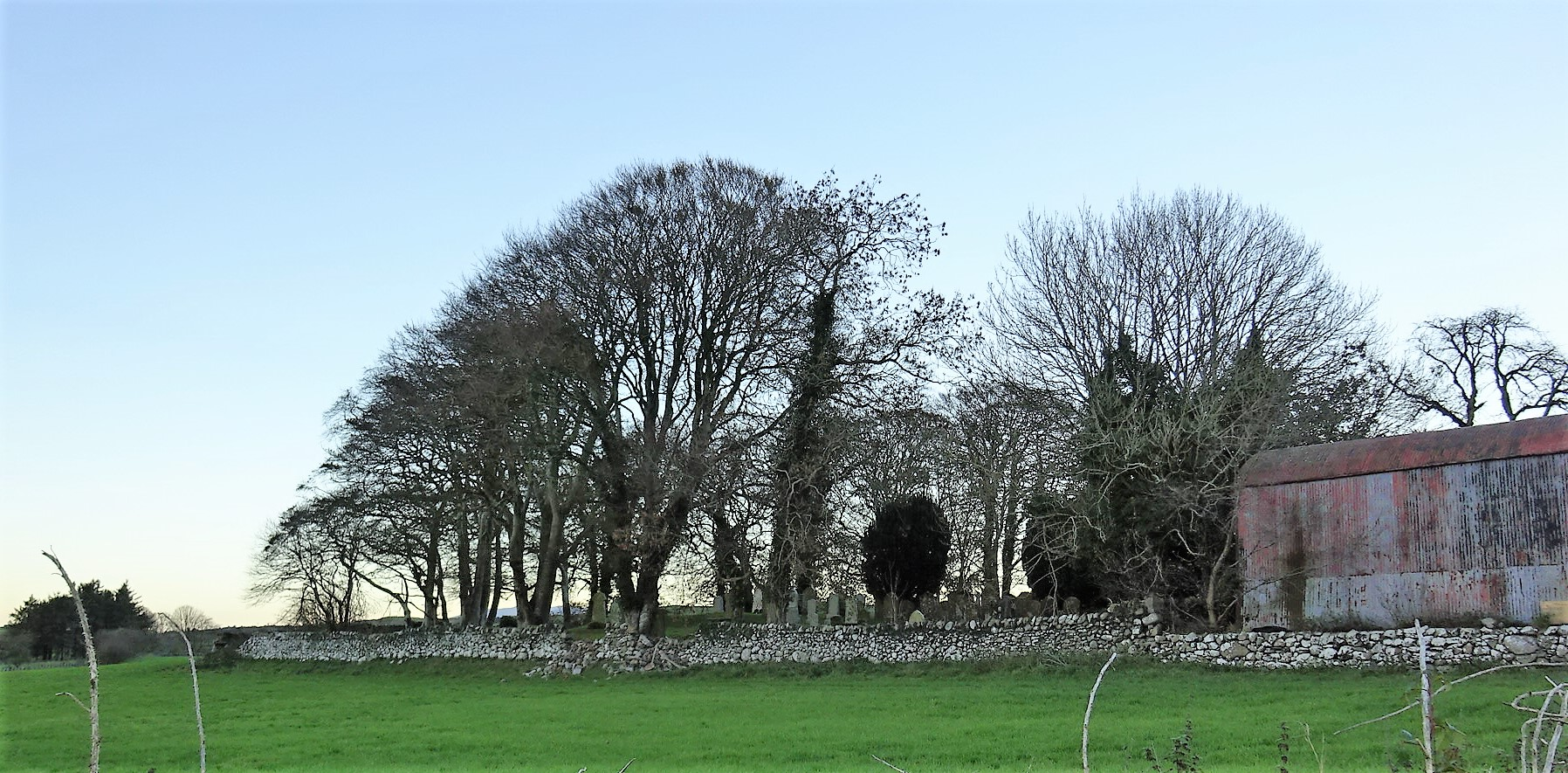
The old kirk and cemetery site from the possible site of the old station.

The parish church dedicated to St Ninian and cemetery of Penninghame were located at the Clachan of Penninghame until around 1777, however the cemetery remained in use until the late 19th century. The surviving house in the clachan is said to have been a public house at one time.

== Other stations ==
- Newton Stewart - junction
- Causeway End railway station
- Kirkinner
- Whauphill
- Sorbie
- Millisle
  - Garlieston
- Broughton Skeog
- Whithorn

Preceding station	Historical railways	Following station
Newton Stewart; Line and station closed	Portpatrick and Wigtownshire Joint Railway	Causeway End; Line and station closed
