= List of listed buildings in Sorbie, Dumfries and Galloway =

This is a list of listed buildings in the civil parish of Sorbie, in Dumfries and Galloway, Scotland.

== List ==
Name	Location	Date Listed	Grid Ref. (Note: Sometimes known as OSGB36, the grid reference (where provided) is based on the British national grid reference system used by the Ordnance Survey. • "Guide to National Grid". Ordnance Survey. • "Get-a-map". Ordnance Survey.)	Geo-coordinates	Notes	LB Number (Note: Historic Environment Scotland assign a unique alphanumeric identifier to each designated site in Scotland, for listed buildings this always begins with "LB", for example "LB12345".)	Image
Garlieston, 20 And 21 South Crescent				54°47′18″N 4°22′07″W	Category B	19165	Upload Photo
Garlieston, 23 South Crescent				54°47′18″N 4°22′07″W	Category C(S)	19167	Upload Photo
Garlieston,11 South Street				54°47′17″N 4°22′10″W	Category B	19173	Upload Photo
Garlieston, 13 South Street And Cowgate				54°47′17″N 4°22′11″W	Category C(S)	19174	Upload Photo
Kirkmadrine, Church And Burial Ground				54°48′20″N 4°22′26″W	Category C(S)	19178	Upload Photo
Millisle, Sorbie Parish Church (Church Of Scotland) And Churchyard				54°47′19″N 4°23′03″W	Category C(S)	19179	Upload Photo
Sorbie, 2 Wigtown Road, The Pheasant Inn				54°47′32″N 4°26′02″W	Category C(S)	19186	Upload Photo
Garlieston, 10 North Crescent				54°47′29″N 4°22′10″W	Category C(S)	17135	Upload Photo
Garlieston,1 High Street The Queens Hotel And Outbuilding				54°47′23″N 4°22′14″W	Category C(S)	16870	Upload Photo
Garlieston, Home Farm				54°46′52″N 4°22′10″W	Category B	16871	Upload Photo
Garlieston, 9 And 10 South Crescent				54°47′21″N 4°22′09″W	Category B	19158	Upload Photo
Garlieston, 5 South Street Kildarroch House				54°47′18″N 4°22′09″W	Category B	19170	Upload Photo
Garlieston, 7 South Street				54°47′18″N 4°22′09″W	Category B	19171	Upload Photo
Garlieston, 25 South Street				54°47′17″N 4°22′13″W	Category B	19177	Upload Photo
Galloway House And Park Walls				54°46′45″N 4°22′02″W	Category A	16876	Upload another image See more images
Galloway House, High Lodge				54°46′07″N 4°22′32″W	Category B	16879	Upload Photo
Galloway House, Walled Garden Including Gardener's Cottage And Garlieston House				54°46′36″N 4°22′16″W	Category B	16881	Upload Photo
Garlieston, 11 And 12 South Crescent				54°47′21″N 4°22′09″W	Category B	19159	Upload Photo
Garlieston, 14 North Crescent				54°47′30″N 4°22′10″W	Category B	17136	Upload Photo
Garlieston, 6 Cowgate				54°47′21″N 4°22′12″W	Category C(S)	16884	Upload Photo
Garlieston,6 South Crescent Lynwood				54°47′22″N 4°22′09″W	Category B	19157	Upload Photo
Garlieston, 15 And 16 South Crescent				54°47′20″N 4°22′09″W	Category B	19162	Upload Photo
Garlieston, 21 South Street				54°47′17″N 4°22′13″W	Category C(S)	19176	Upload Photo
Old Place Of Sorbie Also Known As Sorbie Tower				54°47′39″N 4°24′40″W	Category A	19181	Upload Photo
Sorbie Old Parish Church And Churchyard				54°47′30″N 4°25′47″W	Category B	19184	Upload Photo
Garlieston, 2 South Crescent				54°47′23″N 4°22′10″W	Category C(S)	17142	Upload Photo
Galloway House, Wigtown Lodge				54°47′18″N 4°22′28″W	Category C(S)	16883	Upload Photo
Garlieston, Harbour And Warehouses				54°47′15″N 4°21′51″W	Category B	16868	Upload Photo
Garlieston 7 North Crescent				54°47′28″N 4°22′10″W	Category B	16872	Upload Photo
Galloway House, Cruggleton Lodge, Policy Walls And Gates				54°45′53″N 4°21′25″W	Category C(S)	16877	Upload Photo
Garlieston, 17 South Crescent				54°47′19″N 4°22′08″W	Category B	19163	Upload Photo
Garlieston,9 South Street Dunroamin				54°47′17″N 4°22′10″W	Category B	19172	Upload Photo
Sorbie, 5 St John's, St John's Croft				54°47′29″N 4°25′44″W	Category C(S)	19185	Upload Photo
Garlieston, 15 North Crescent				54°47′30″N 4°22′09″W	Category B	17137	Upload Photo
Garlieston, 15 Culderry Row Lincoln Cottage				54°47′27″N 4°22′12″W	Category B	16867	Upload Photo
Garlieston, High Street Mirfield				54°47′21″N 4°22′15″W	Category C(S)	16869	Upload Photo
Cruggleton Church And Walled Burial Ground				54°45′26″N 4°22′00″W	Category A	16875	Upload another image See more images
Galloway House, Garlieston Lodge				54°47′14″N 4°22′15″W	Category B	16878	Upload Photo
Garlieston, 18 And 19 South Crescent The Harbour Inn				54°47′19″N 4°22′07″W	Category B	19164	Upload Photo
Garlieston ,22 South Crescent				54°47′18″N 4°22′07″W	Category B	19166	Upload Photo
Old Manse Of Sorbie				54°47′30″N 4°25′42″W	Category B	19180	Upload Photo
Sorbie Former Uf Church				54°47′32″N 4°26′03″W	Category B	19183	Upload Photo
Garlieston, 16 North Crescent				54°47′30″N 4°22′08″W	Category B	17138	Upload Photo
Garlieston, 17 North Crescent				54°47′30″N 4°22′09″W	Category C(S)	17139	Upload Photo
Garlieston, 8 North Crescent				54°47′28″N 4°22′10″W	Category C(S)	16873	Upload Photo
Garlieston, 5 South Crescent				54°47′22″N 4°22′10″W	Category B	19156	Upload Photo
Garlieston, 3 South Street Oakmere				54°47′18″N 4°22′08″W	Category B	19169	Upload Photo
Garlieston, 19 South Street Southview				54°47′17″N 4°22′12″W	Category C(S)	19175	Upload Photo
Pouton Mains				54°46′58″N 4°23′14″W	Category B	19182	Upload Photo
Garlieston, 4 South Crescent				54°47′23″N 4°22′09″W	Category B	19155	Upload Photo
Garlieston, 13 South Crescent				54°47′20″N 4°22′09″W	Category B	19160	Upload Photo
Garlieston, 14 South Crescent				54°47′20″N 4°22′09″W	Category B	19161	Upload Photo
Garlieston, 2 South Street Garden Walls And Outbuilding To Rear				54°47′17″N 4°22′08″W	Category B	19168	Upload Photo
Garlieston, North Crescent Garlieston Mill Bridge				54°47′24″N 4°22′09″W	Category B	17140	Upload Photo
Garlieston 1 South Crescent Torwood				54°47′24″N 4°22′10″W	Category C(S)	17141	Upload Photo
Cults Farmhouse				54°45′48″N 4°23′28″W	Category C(S)	16874	Upload Photo
Galloway House, Park Cottage				54°47′08″N 4°21′53″W	Category B	16880	Upload Photo
Galloway House, Whithorn Lodge				54°46′31″N 4°22′50″W	Category B	16882	Upload Photo

== Key ==
The scheme for classifying buildings in Scotland is:

- Category A: "buildings of national or international importance, either architectural or historic; or fine, little-altered examples of some particular period, style or building type."
- Category B: "buildings of regional or more than local importance; or major examples of some particular period, style or building type, which may have been altered."
- Category C: "buildings of local importance; lesser examples of any period, style, or building type, as originally constructed or moderately altered; and simple traditional buildings which group well with other listed buildings."

In March 2016 there were 47,288 listed buildings in Scotland. Of these, 8% were Category A, and 50% were Category B, with the remaining 42% being Category C.
