= List of listed buildings in Penninghame, Dumfries and Galloway =

This is a list of listed buildings in the civil parish of Penninghame, in Dumfries and Galloway, Scotland.

== List ==
Name	Location	Date Listed	Grid Ref. (Note: Sometimes known as OSGB36, the grid reference (where provided) is based on the British national grid reference system used by the Ordnance Survey. • "Guide to National Grid". Ordnance Survey. • "Get-a-map". Ordnance Survey.)	Geo-coordinates	Notes	LB Number (Note: Historic Environment Scotland assign a unique alphanumeric identifier to each designated site in Scotland, for listed buildings this always begins with "LB", for example "LB12345".)	Image
Baltersan Steading With Silo				54°55′21″N 4°27′44″W	Category B	19188	Upload Photo
Challoch, All Saints Church Manse With Retaining Walls And Gatepiers				54°58′31″N 4°31′29″W	Category B	19191	Upload Photo
Mochrum Park Lodge With Gates Gatepiers And Quadrant Walls				54°53′09″N 4°33′11″W	Category C(S)	19198	Upload Photo
Penninghame Open Prison (Formerly Penninghame House) With Stables And Walled Garden				54°59′48″N 4°31′48″W	Category B	19200	Upload Photo
Baltersan Farmhouse				54°55′20″N 4°27′42″W	Category B	19187	Upload Photo
Penninghame Clachan				54°55′14″N 4°28′44″W	Category B	19199	Upload Photo
Challoch, Lingree Bridge				54°58′27″N 4°31′27″W	Category C(S)	19193	Upload Photo
Castle Stewart				54°59′22″N 4°32′06″W	Category B	19189	Upload Photo
Merton Hall				54°56′39″N 4°31′35″W	Category B	19196	Upload Photo
Challoch, All Saints Episcopal Church With Boundary Walls And Gatepiers				54°58′33″N 4°31′29″W	Category A	19190	Upload another image
Mochrum Park				54°52′57″N 4°33′10″W	Category C(S)	19197	Upload Photo
Challoch Farmhouse And Steadings				54°58′15″N 4°31′30″W	Category B	19192	Upload Photo
Clauchaneasy Bridge				55°02′37″N 4°34′30″W	Category B	19194	Upload Photo
Killiemore (Formerly Kirkchrist House)				54°59′47″N 4°34′15″W	Category C(S)	19195	Upload Photo

== Key ==
The scheme for classifying buildings in Scotland is:

- Category A: "buildings of national or international importance, either architectural or historic; or fine, little-altered examples of some particular period, style or building type."
- Category B: "buildings of regional or more than local importance; or major examples of some particular period, style or building type, which may have been altered."
- Category C: "buildings of local importance; lesser examples of any period, style, or building type, as originally constructed or moderately altered; and simple traditional buildings which group well with other listed buildings."

In March 2016 there were 47,288 listed buildings in Scotland. Of these, 8% were Category A, and 50% were Category B, with the remaining 42% being Category C.
