= Edward Black (minister) =

Edward Black (December 10, 1793 – May 7, 1845) was a minister and teacher in Canada associated with the Church of Scotland.

Edward was born in Penninghame, Scotland and received his education at local schools and, latterly, at the University of Edinburgh. He began to preach as an assistant to his father in 1815 and moved to Canada with his wife after his father's death in 1822. He settled in Montreal, probably because of an old friend, Peter McGill, and Peter introduced him to the minister of that city's Scotch Presbyterian Church.

Black's career was a time of growth and unrest within the Presbyterian Church of Canada. His own situation required him to seek another source of income for him and his family. He opened a school and had James Moir Ferres assist him as a teacher. His tenure in Montreal sparked action that resulted in the establishment of the synod of the Presbyterian Church of Canada. His early death was deeply mourned and much was written of his contributions to his church and community.
