= Dyke White =

Scottish artist

Charles Gordon McClure (1885–1933), also known as Dyke White, was a Scottish artist, best known for his political cartoons in the Scottish press.

== Biography ==
Dyke White

He was born in Garlieston, Wigtownshire, the youngest of the seven children of William McClure and Catherine, née Puckett, and was always known by the family as Gordon. Gordon’s father was originally a shopkeeper in Garlieston, but the family moved to Glasgow some time between 1891 and 1901.

Gordon attended the Glasgow School of Art, and was awarded a Haldane Travelling Scholarship which enabled him to travel on the continent. He was initially a painter, and exhibited at the Glasgow Royal Institute of Fine Arts and other Scottish exhibitions. One of his oil paintings is said to have caused a furore in the Glasgow Art Gallery. It was called “The Intruder”, and was a painting of a lady bathing in the bulrushes with someone peeping in at her. He found he had a talent as a cartoonist, and joined the Glasgow branch of the National Union of Journalists in November 1917, moving to London in June 1926 and back to Glasgow in January 1929. He became a well-known cartoonist, working for Outram Press in Glasgow. His cartoons give a lively take on Public Life in the 1920s and 30's. They were regularly printed in various Glasgow papers, including the Daily Record and Mail, and the Scottish Daily Express, and also for a period in London papers. He always worked under the pseudonym Dyke White, a name which harks back to his childhood in Garlieston (White Dyke Farm.) He worked briefly as a political cartoonist for the Rand Daily Mail in Johannesburg, South Africa, but returned home, probably because he was disillusioned by the politics there.

Gordon was married to Hilda (née Butler), and they had three children – Ramsey, Robin and Rachel.

He died on 25 July 1933 in Lenzie, near Glasgow. After his untimely death, a Memorial Exhibition of his cartoons was held by the Glasgow Art Club.
