= James Moir Ferres =

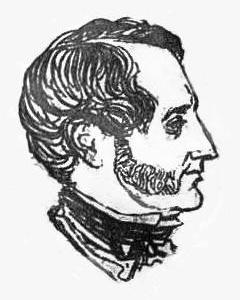
- James Moir Ferres, 1849
- Born: circa 1813; Aberdeen, Scotland
- Died: April 21, 1870; Kingston, Ontario, Canada
- Occupations: Journalist, political figure

James Moir Ferres (c. 1813 – April 21, 1870) was a journalist and political figure in Upper Canada.

== Biography ==
He was born in Aberdeen, Scotland in about 1813 and studied at Marischal College in Aberdeen. Ferres came to Montreal in 1833 and taught at Edward Black's school there. He then became director of the academy at Frelighsburg in the Eastern Townships. In 1835, he was a co-founder of the Missiskoui Standard, a weekly newspaper. In 1836, he returned to Montreal to work with the Montreal Herald; he became editor in 1839. As a Tory supporter, Ferres received a number of political appointments. He served as secretary of the Montreal Turnpike Trust from 1840 to 1842 and, from 1844 to 1848, he was a revenue inspector at Montreal.

In 1848, Ferres became editor and chief owner of the Montreal Gazette; he remained editor until the paper was sold in 1854. He opposed the Rebellion Losses Bill of 1849, as owner of the Montreal Gazette he used the newspaper to launch a series of anti-French Canadian attacks, having rallied against the Bill as “a nefarious attempt at robbery” of the Anglo-Saxon population by “an insignificant French nationality in a corner of Canada.” Subsequently, he was arrested but never prosecuted following the burning of the parliament buildings at Montreal. In 1854, he was elected to the Legislative Assembly of the Province of Canada in East Missisquoi as a Conservative. He was elected in Brome in 1858.

He was named to the Board of Inspectors of Asylums and Prisons in 1861 and became chairman of the board in 1868. In 1869, Ferres was named warden for Kingston Penitentiary; Ferres died in Kingston in 1870 and was buried at Lachine, Quebec.

== Personal life ==
He married Sarah Robertson, a native of Aberdeen, in Montreal in 1834.
