= Palnure railway station =

Former railway station in Dumfries and Galloway, Scotland

Coordinates: 54.9413°N 4.4199°W

Palnure

General information
- Location: Newton Stewart, Kirkcudbrightshire; Scotland
- Platforms: 2

Other information
- Status: Disused

History
- Original company: Portpatrick Railway
- Pre-grouping: Caledonian, Glasgow & South Western, Midland and London North Western Railways

Key dates
- 1 July 1861: Opened
- 7 May 1951: Closed to passengers
- Line closed completely: 14 June 1965
Location

Palnure railway station (NX450634) was a railway station on the Portpatrick and Wigtownshire Joint Railway close to Newton Stewart and the junction for the branch to Whithorn via Wigtown. It served the small village of Palnure in a rural area of the old county of Kirkcudbrightshire, Parish of Minnigaff, Dumfries And Galloway.

== Infrastructure ==
In 1894 the station had one platform on the northern side of the single line with a small station with outbuildings and a weighing machine. A single siding ran at an angle with a passing loop on the Newton Stewart side with a small building, a loading dock and a weighing machine. In 1907 the station had two platforms with a signal box on the northern side and a small shelter on the southern side. The Palnure Viaduct over the Palnure Burn near by on the line to Creetown.

== History ==
The Portpatrick and Wigtownshire Joint Railway was formed from the amalgamation of two railway companies, the Portpatrick Railway and the Wigtownshire Railway. The line was jointly owned by the Caledonian Railway, Glasgow & South Western Railway, Midland Railway and the London & North Western Railway and was managed by the Portpatrick and Wigtownshire Joint Committee.

The goods station remained until 1959 and the station passing loop was lifted in 1952. A bad derailment took place in 1922 close to Palnure, and following an assessment of the state of the permanent way the Ministry of Transport placed the whole of the main line under a 45 mph restriction, until it was relaid and reballasted over a two-year period.

== The site today ==
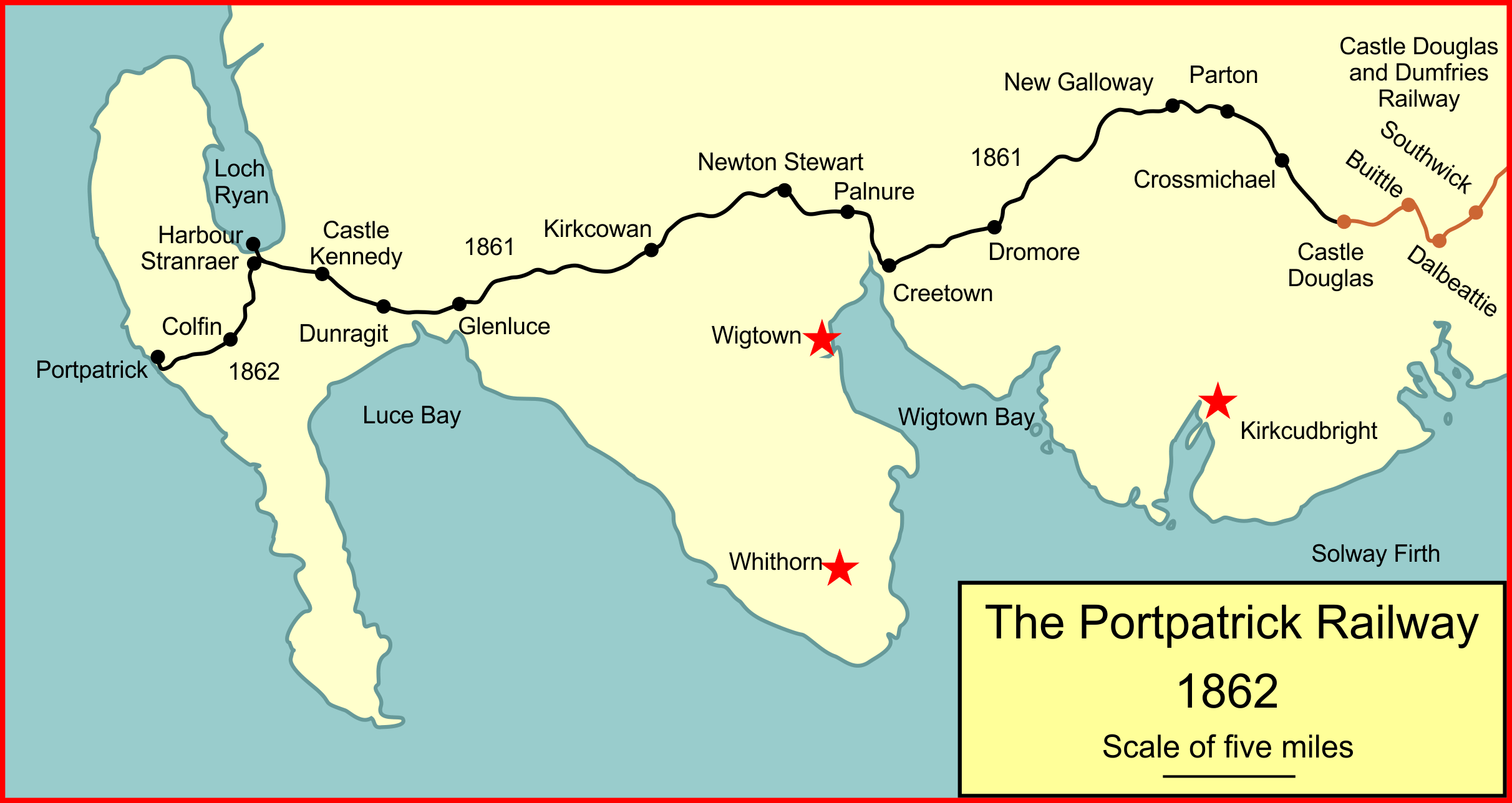
The Portpatrick Railway system, 1861-2

Following the Beeching cuts closure of the Paddy Line in 1960s the station building was named Station House after its conversion into a private residence. A railway cottage also survives.

== See also ==
- List of closed railway stations in Britain

| Preceding station | Historical railways | Following station |
|---|---|---|
| Creetown; Line and station closed | Portpatrick and Wigtownshire Joint Railway | Newton Stewart; Line and station closed |
