= Whithorn railway station =

Former railway station in Scotland

Coordinates: 54.7386°N 4.4156°W

Whithorn
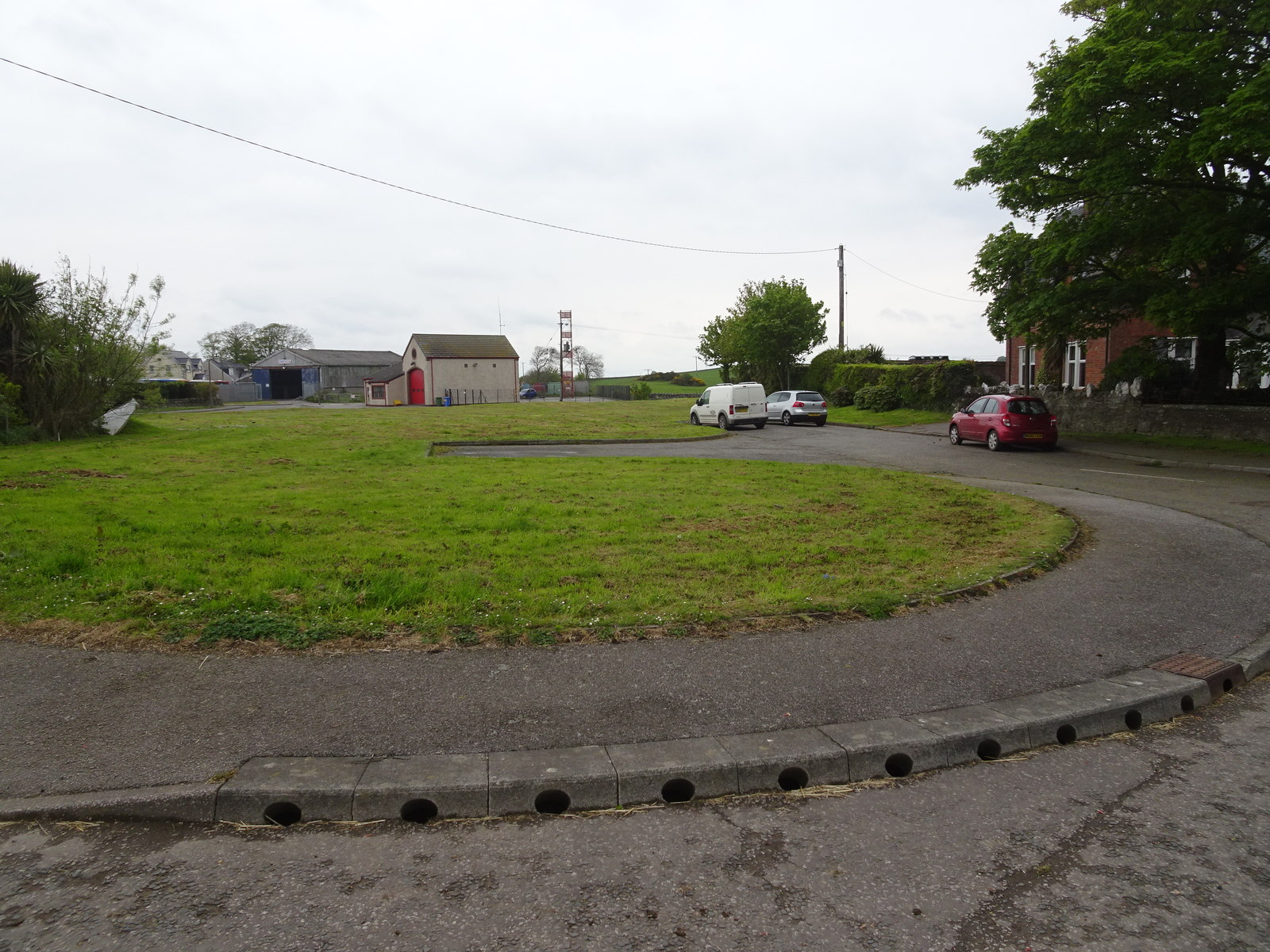
- The site of the station in 2019

General information
- Location: Whithorn, Wigtownshire; Scotland

Other information
- Status: Disused

History
- Original company: Wigtownshire Railway
- Pre-grouping: Caledonian, Glasgow & South Western, Midland and London North Western Railways

Key dates
- 9 July 1877: Opened
- 25 September 1950: Closed to passengers
- 1964: closed completely
Location

Whithorn is the closed terminus of the Wigtownshire Railway branch, from Newton Stewart, of the Portpatrick and Wigtownshire Joint Railway. It served the town of Whithorn in Wigtownshire. The line was closed to passenger services in 1950, and to goods in 1964.

== Other stations ==
- Newton Stewart - junction
- Mains of Penninghame
- Wigtown
- Kirkinner
- Whauphill
- Sorbie
- Millisle - junction
  - Garlieston
- Whithorn

== See also ==
- List of closed railway stations in Britain
