= Garlieston =

Coordinates: 54.79045°N 4.35776°W

- Location within Dumfries and Galloway
- Population: unknown (2001 Census)
- OS grid reference: NX485465
- Council area: Dumfries and Galloway
- Lieutenancy area: Wigtownshire
- Country: Scotland
- Sovereign state: United Kingdom
- Post town: NEWTON STEWART
- Postcode district: DG8
- Dialling code: 01988
- Police: Scotland
- Fire: Scottish
- Ambulance: Scottish
- UK Parliament: Dumfries and Galloway
- Scottish Parliament: Galloway and West Dumfries

Garlieston (Scottish Gaelic: Baile Gheàrr Lios, IPA:[ˈpaləʝeaːᵲʎis̪]) is a small planned coastal village in the historical county of Wigtownshire in Dumfries and Galloway, south west Scotland. It was founded in the mid 18th century by Lord Garlies, later 6th Earl of Galloway.

== Location and history ==
The village lies 5 miles (8.0 km) northeast of Whithorn and a few miles north of Cruggleton Castle which was abandoned in the 17th century. The former seat of the Earls of Galloway, Galloway House, is situated on the edge of the village, with the settlement being planned along Georgian lines. When the house was built, the people living in the village of Carswell were moved to Garlieston.

The port became an important import point for goods being brought into the Machars throughout the 19th and early 20th centuries. In 1876 the Wigtownshire Railway was extended to the settlement and goods flowed regularly through the port, with the maritime industries of shipbuilding and associated activities taking place in the village.

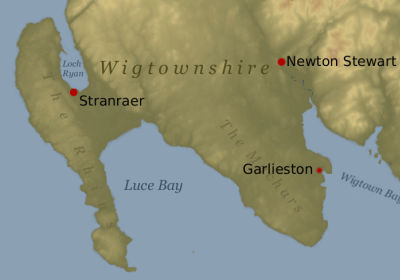
Location of Garlieston in SW Scotland

== Second World War ==
During the Second World War the village became part of the secret Mulberry Harbour project in preparation for D-Day. The profile of the beach and sea bed at Garlieston was similar to that of the proposed harbour sites in Normandy and that, coupled with the remote nature of the locality, led to Garlieston and the surrounding area being selected as the development region for the artificial harbours. Prototypes of three designs were trialled in Garlieston Harbour and at nearby Rigg Bay and Portyerrock. A concrete caisson (code-named Hippo) from the harbours could be seen in Cruggleton (or Rigg) Bay until it was destroyed by a storm on Sunday 12 March 2006. Remnants of the prototypes, in particular concrete Beetles that supported the floating roadways, can be seen at Eggerness, Portyerrock and Rigg Bay. The remains are now scheduled as national monuments by Historic Scotland.

== Currently ==
Today the village is in general a quiet sleepy place, with much of the local industry and port activity having ceased over the past 50 years. Garlieston railway station was closed in 1964. A bowling green sits on the waterfront and the village caravan site attracts tourists, with the harbour providing berthing facilities for those who are touring by boat. Although Galloway House is privately owned, the gardens, managed separately by the Galloway House Gardens charity are open to the public and pay and display parking provides easy access to the gardens and Rigg Bay.

== Notable natives ==
- Charles Gordon McClure (1885–1933), also known as Dyke White, cartoonist
- Earls of Galloway at Galloway House.

== Gallery ==
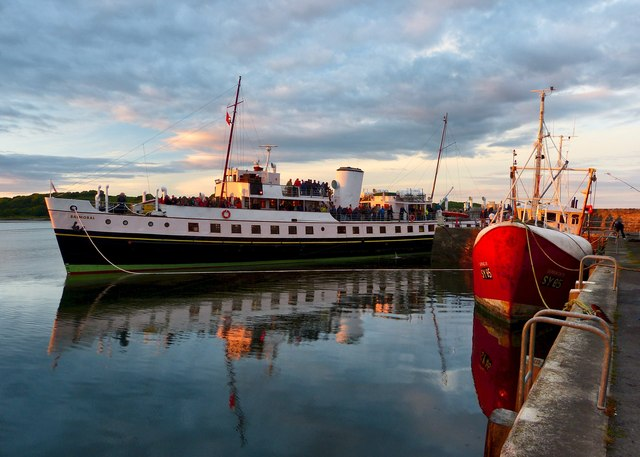
Garlieston Bay and Harbour

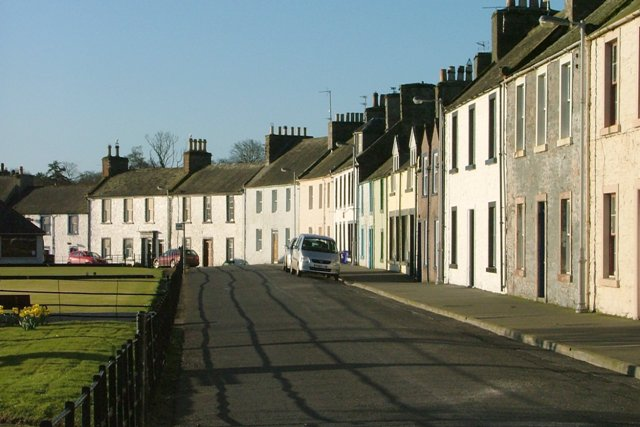

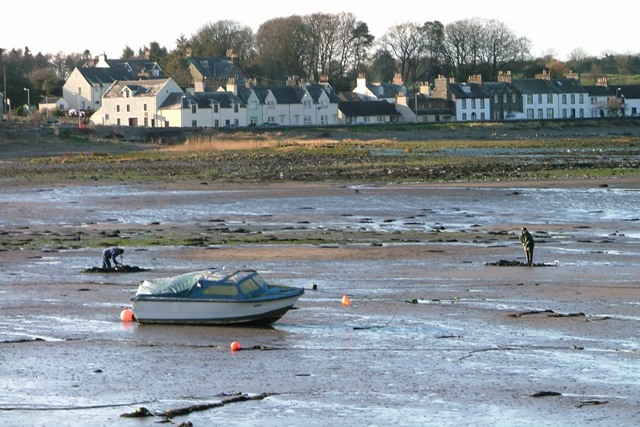

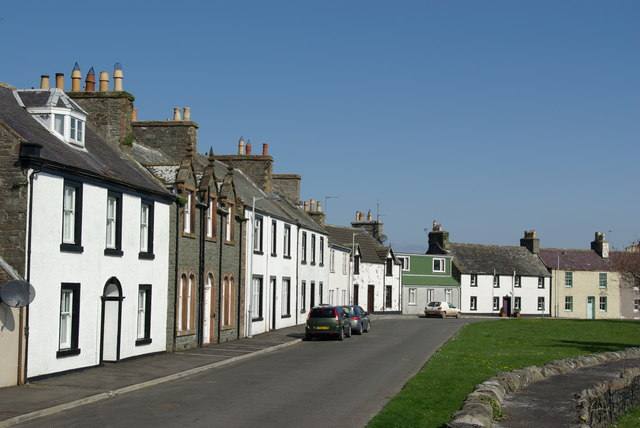

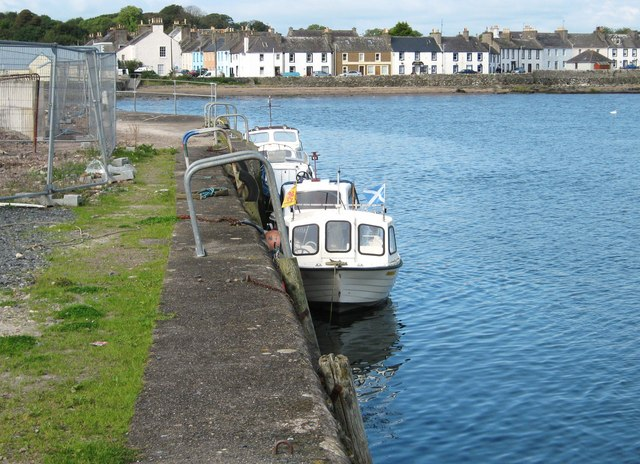
