= Garlieston railway station =

Former railway station in Scotland

Garlieston
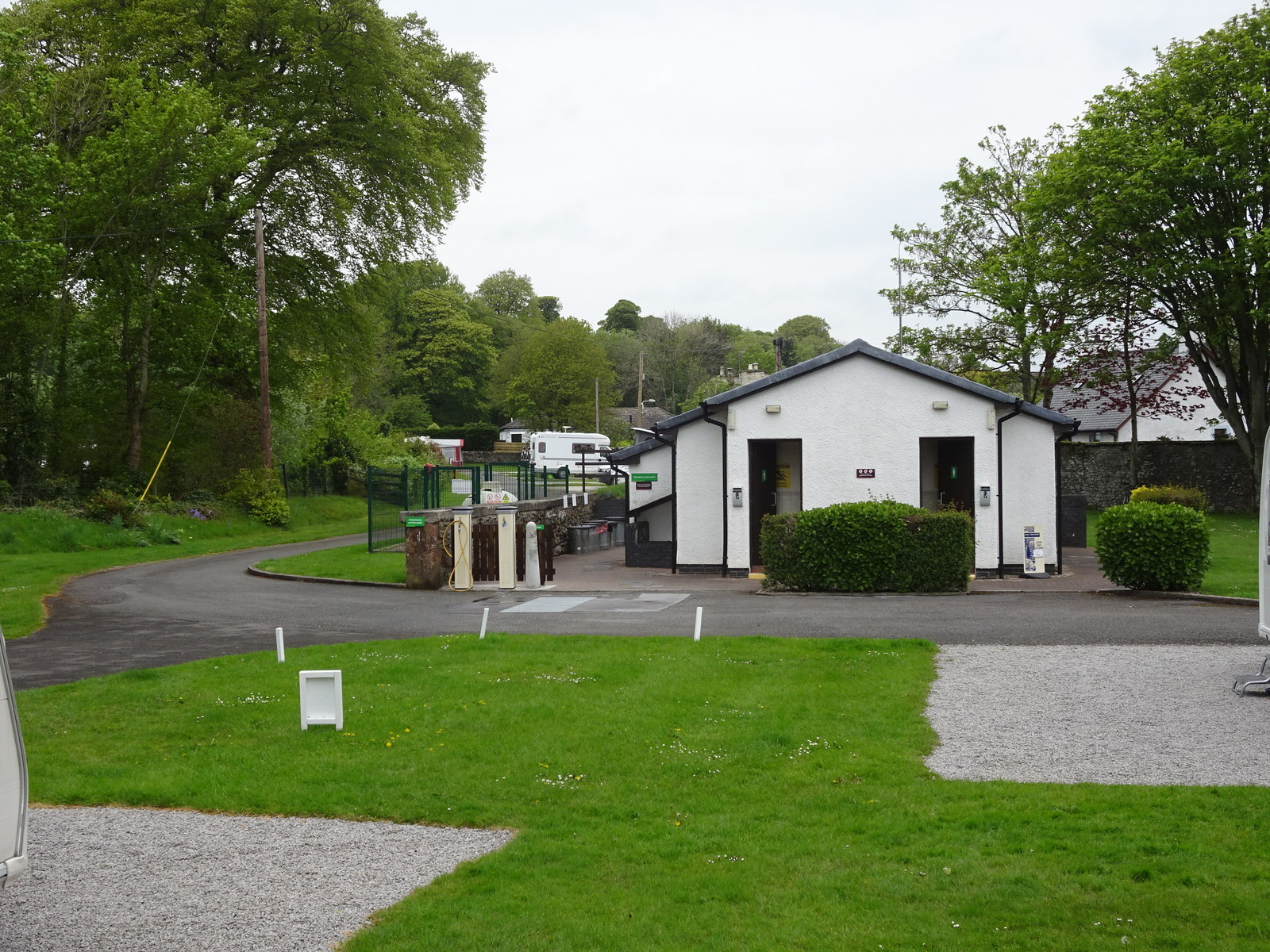
- The site of the station in 2019

General information
- Location: Garlieston, Wigtownshire; Scotland
- Coordinates: 54.78788°N 4.36950°W

Other information
- Status: Disused

History
- Original company: Wigtownshire Railway
- Pre-grouping: Caledonian, Glasgow & South Western, Midland and London North Western Railways
- Post-grouping: LMS

Key dates
- 3 April 1876: Opened
- 1 March 1903: Closed to passenger services
- 1964: Closed to all services
Location

Garlieston is the closed terminus of the Garlieston branch of Wigtownshire Railway; running from a junction at Millisle. It served the coastal village and harbour of Garlieston in Wigtownshire. The Garlieston branch, together with the rest of the Wigtownshire Railway, closed completely in 1964.

The Wigtownshire Railway was itself a branch of the Portpatrick and Wigtownshire Joint Railway; running from a junction at Newton Stewart to Whithorn.

== Services ==
The branch opened from Millisle to Garlieston on 3 April 1876 for both goods and passengers.

Regular passenger services ceased on the Garlieston branch on 1 March 1903. However, Garlieston had a good harbour and it occasionally ran boat excursions to the Isle of Man. These were well patronised, so the railway continued to provide excursion trains to Garlieston until 1935.

Goods services ran from Newton Stewart to Whithorn and to Garlieston until the Whithorn branch closed completely on 5 October 1964. By the 1960s, these services ran three days per week; with conditional working on the Garlieston branch, when required.

| Preceding station | Historical railways | Following station |
|---|---|---|
| Millisle | Caledonian, Glasgow & South Western, Midland and London North Western Railways; Portpatrick and Wigtownshire Joint Railway | Terminus |

== See also ==
- List of closed railway stations in Britain
