= Newton Stewart railway station =

Disused railway station in Newton Stewart, Dumfries and Galloway

Newton Stewart
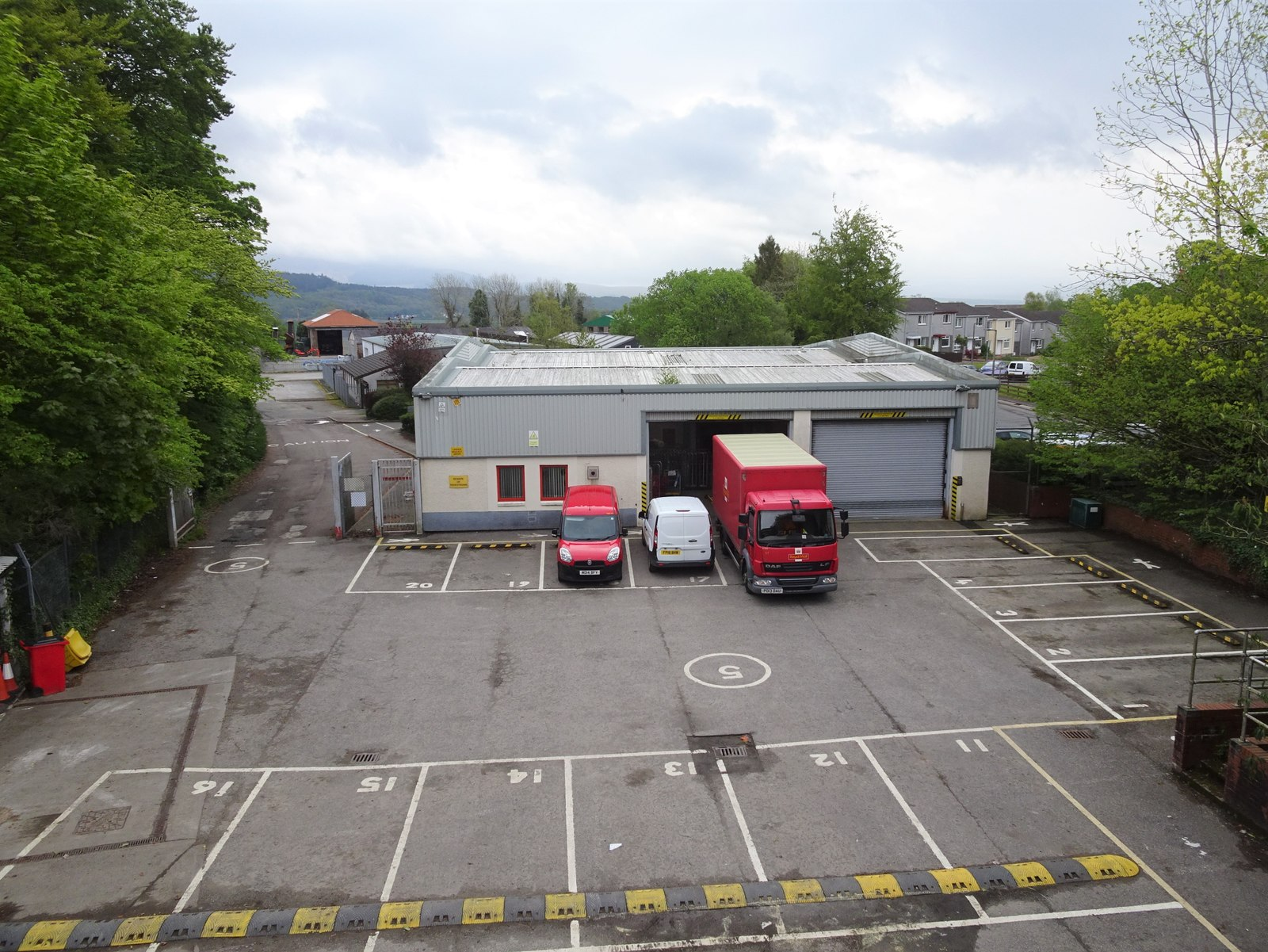
- The site of the station, looking Eastern towards Palnure, in 2019

General information
- Location: Newton Stewart, Wigtownshire; Scotland
- Coordinates: 54.9537°N 4.4913°W
- Grid reference: NX405649
- Platforms: 3

Other information
- Status: Disused

History
- Original company: Portpatrick Railway
- Pre-grouping: Portpatrick and Wigtownshire Joint Railway; Caledonian Railway
- Post-grouping: London, Midland and Scottish Railway British Rail (Scottish Region)

Key dates
- 12 March 1861: Opened
- 14 June 1965: Closed
Location

Newton Stewart railway station served the town of Newton Stewart, in the historic county of Wigtownshire in the administrative area of Dumfries and Galloway, Scotland from 1861 to 1965 on the Portpatrick and Wigtownshire Joint Railway.

== History ==
The station opened on 12 March 1861 and was situated by the Portpatrick and Wigtownshire Joint Railway with the goods yard, a structure which still survives today, to the north. A locomotive shed to the west of the junction was built in 1920. The station was closed to both passengers and goods traffic on 14 June 1965.

Preceding station	Disused railways	Following station
Palnure; Line and station closed	Portpatrick and Wigtownshire Joint Railway	Mains of Penninghame; Line and station closed
Palnure; Line and station closed	Portpatrick and Wigtownshire Joint Railway	Kirkcowan; Line and station closed
