= Castle Kennedy railway station =

Disused railway station in Castle Kennedy, Dumfries and Galloway

Castle Kennedy
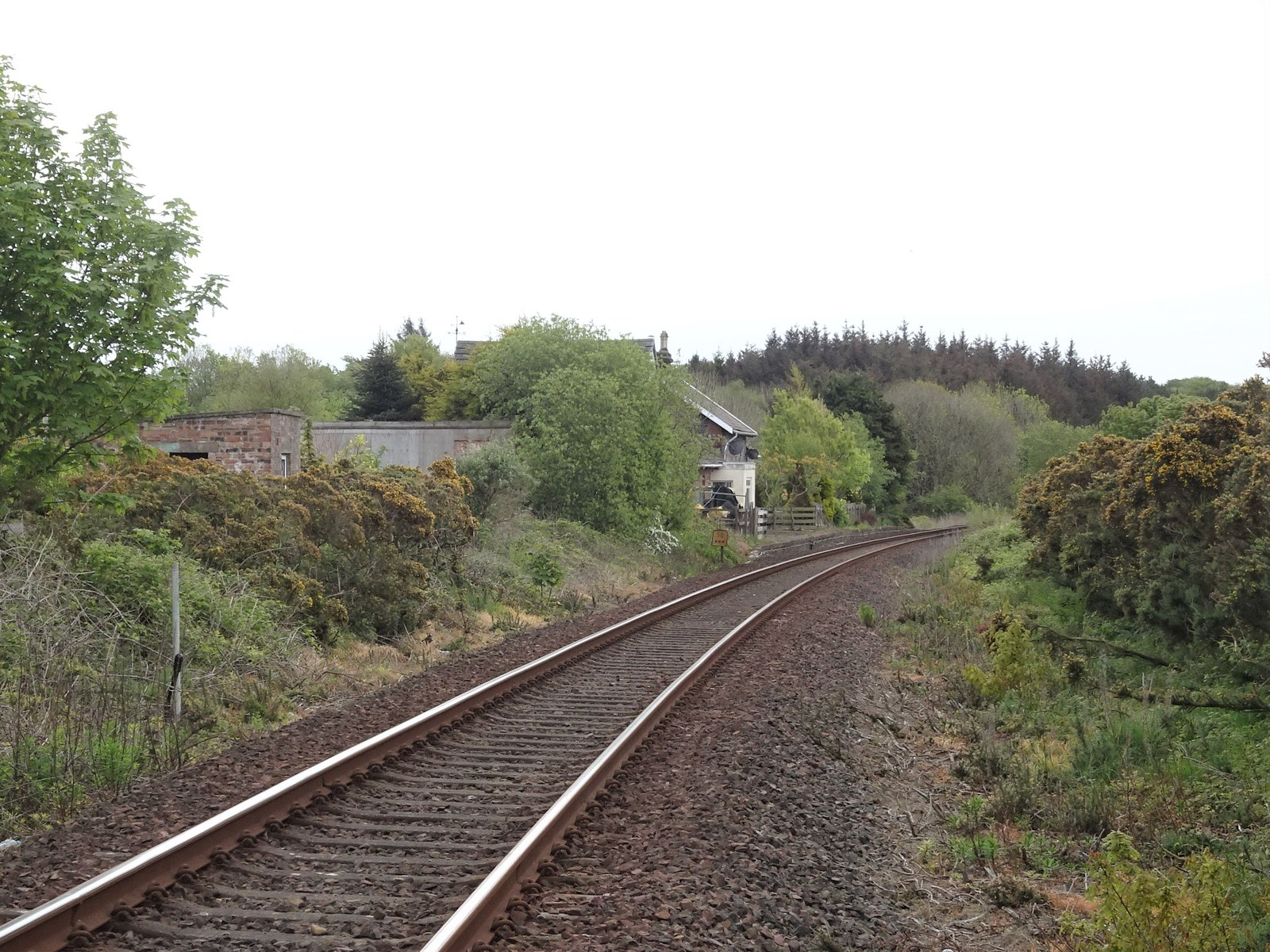
- Site of the station, looking east towards Dunragit, in 2019

General information
- Location: Castle Kennedy, Dumfries and Galloway; Scotland
- Coordinates: 54.8943°N 4.9534°W
- Grid reference: NX107595
- Platforms: 2

Other information
- Status: Disused

History
- Original company: Portpatrick Railway
- Pre-grouping: Portpatrick and Wigtownshire Joint Railway; Caledonian Railway
- Post-grouping: London, Midland and Scottish Railway British Rail (Scottish Region)

Key dates
- 12 March 1861: Opened
- 14 June 1965: Closed
Location

Castle Kennedy railway station served the village of Castle Kennedy, in the historic county of Wigtownshire in the administrative area of Dumfries and Galloway, Scotland from 1861 to 1965 on the Portpatrick and Wigtownshire Joint Railway.

== History ==
The station opened on 12 March 1861 by the Portpatrick and Wigtownshire Joint Railway. To the northwest was the goods yard and to the south was the signal box. The signal box was replaced in 1942 when the line was doubled to Dunragit. The station was closed to both passengers and goods traffic on 14 June 1965, while the signal box closed in 1970, at the same time the line to Dunragit was again singled.

Preceding station	Disused railways	Following station
Dunragit; Line partially open, station closed	Portpatrick and Wigtownshire Joint Railway	Stranraer Harbour; Line and station open
