= Colfin railway station =

Former railway station in Scotland

Colfin
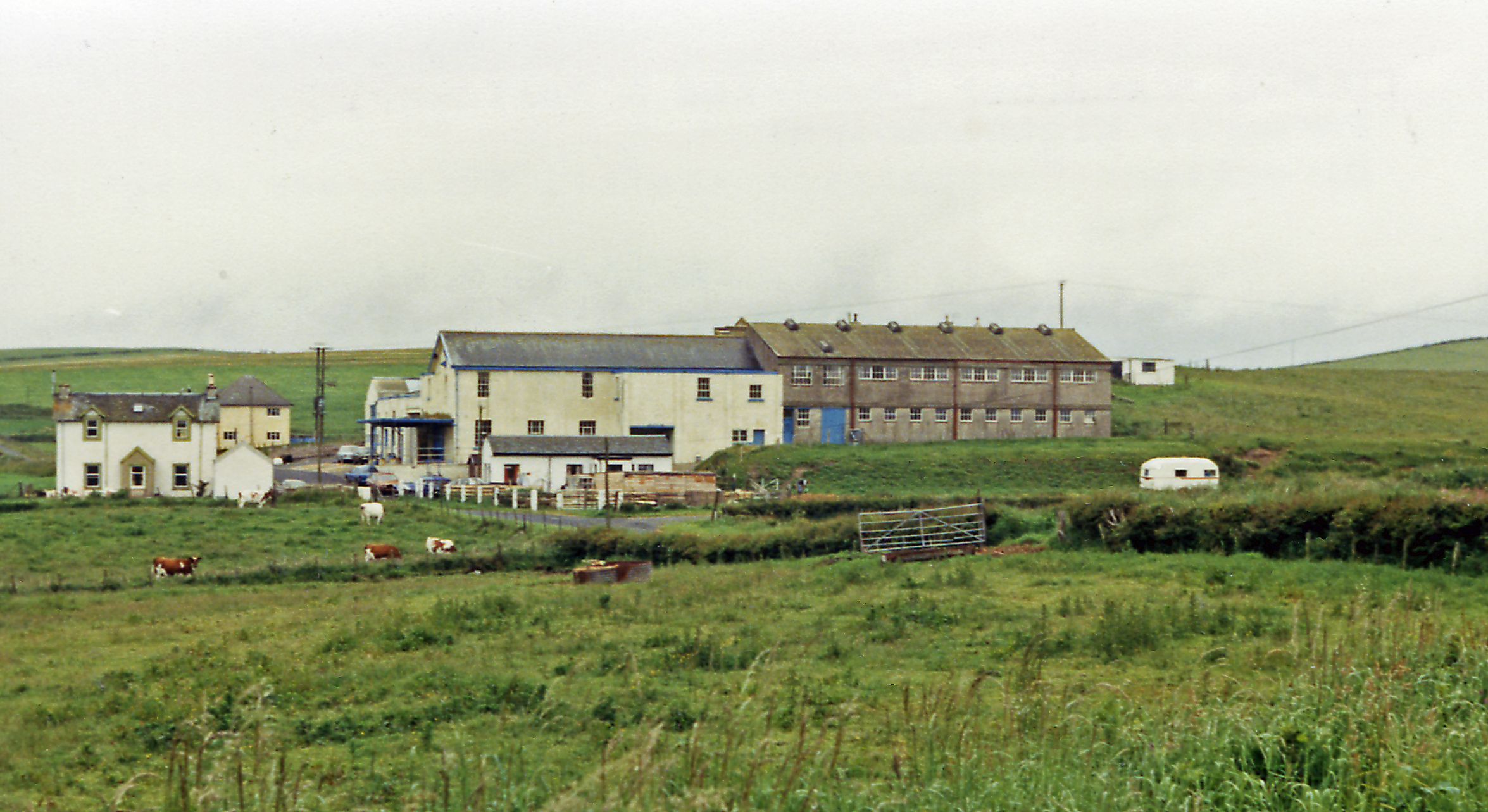
- Remains of the station in 1986

General information
- Location: Scotland
- Coordinates: 54.8489°N 5.0553°W

Other information
- Status: Disused

History
- Original company: Portpatrick Railway
- Pre-grouping: Portpatrick and Wigtownshire Joint Railway

Key dates
- 28 August 1862: Station opened
- 6 February 1950: Station closed for passengers
- 1 April 1959: closed for freight service
Location

Colfin railway station, located in Wigtownshire, Scotland, between Portpatrick and Stranraer, was a station on the Portpatrick and Wigtownshire Joint Railway. Opened on 28 August 1862, when the extension of the line from Stranraer to Portpatrick was put in service, it was closed on 6 February 1950, though freight service between Colfin and Stranraer continued until 1 April 1959, serving the Colfin Creamery, which had been built in proximity to the station.

== Route ==
Preceding station	Disused railways	Following station
Stranraer Town	Portpatrick and Wigtownshire Joint Railway	Portpatrick
