= New Galloway railway station =

Disused railway station in New Galloway, Dumfries and Galloway

New Galloway
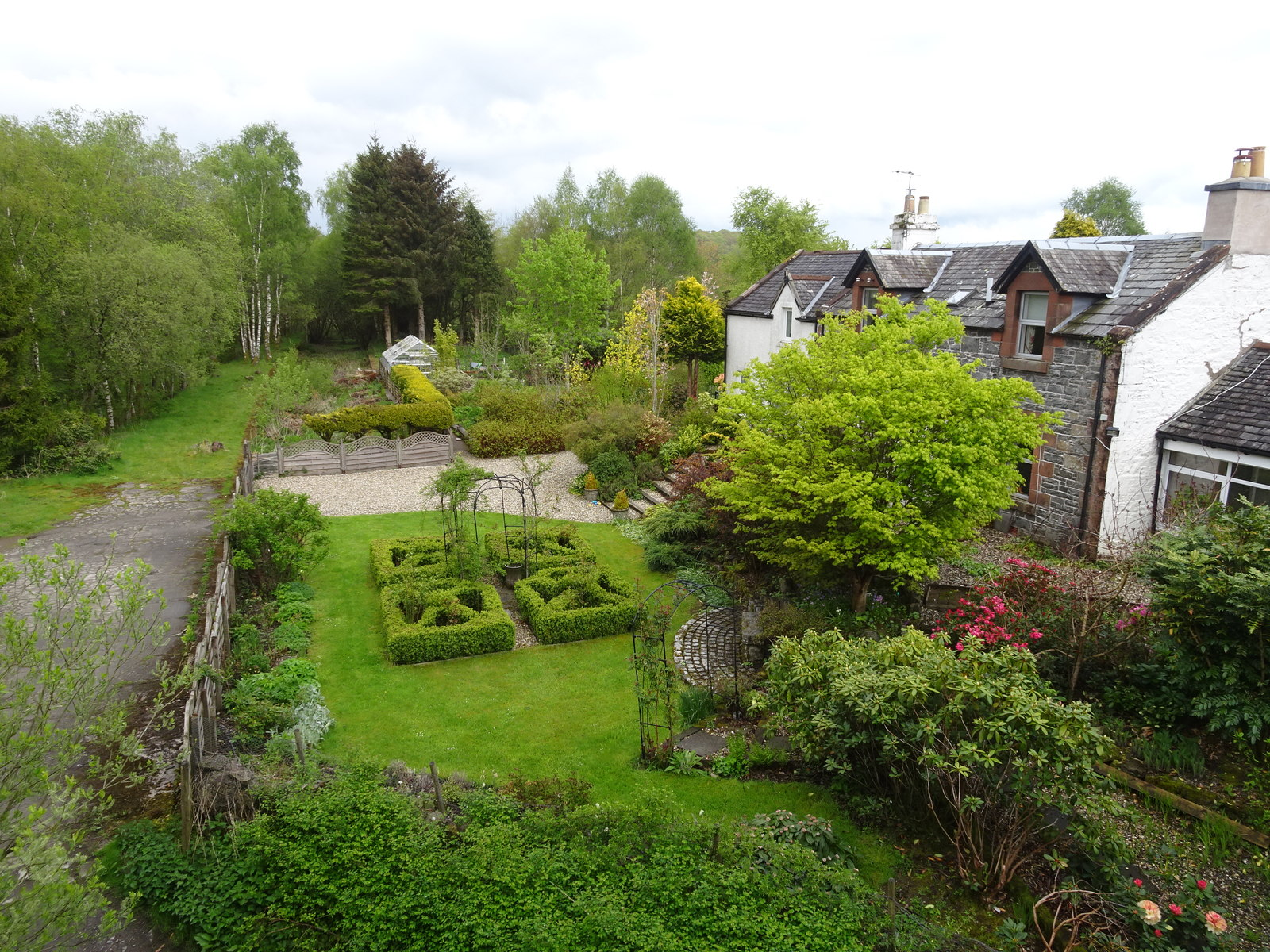
- The site of the station, looking east towards Parton, in 2019

General information
- Location: New Galloway, Kirkcudbrightshire; Scotland
- Coordinates: 55.0109°N 4.0951°W
- Grid reference: NX661704

Other information
- Status: Disused

History
- Original company: Portpatrick Railway
- Pre-grouping: Portpatrick and Wigtownshire Joint Railway; Caledonian Railway
- Post-grouping: London, Midland and Scottish Railway British Rail (Scottish Region)

Key dates
- 12 March 1861: Opened
- 14 June 1965: Closed
Location

New Galloway railway station served the town of New Galloway in the historic county of Kirkcudbrightshire in the administrative area of Dumfries and Galloway, Scotland, from 1861 to 1965 on the Portpatrick and Wigtownshire Joint Railway.

== History ==
The station opened on 12 March 1861 by the Portpatrick and Wigtownshire Joint Railway. The signal box was situated east of the westbound platform and the goods yard was to the north. The platforms were extended in 1891. The station closed to both passengers and goods on 14 June 1965.

== Station site today ==
The station master's house, the road bridge and part of the platforms still exist.

Preceding station	Disused railways	Following station
Parton; Line and station closed	Portpatrick and Wigtownshire Joint Railway	Loch Skerrow Halt; Line and station closed
