= Gatehouse of Fleet railway station =

Disused railway station in Gatehouse of Fleet, Dumfries and Galloway

Gatehouse of Fleet
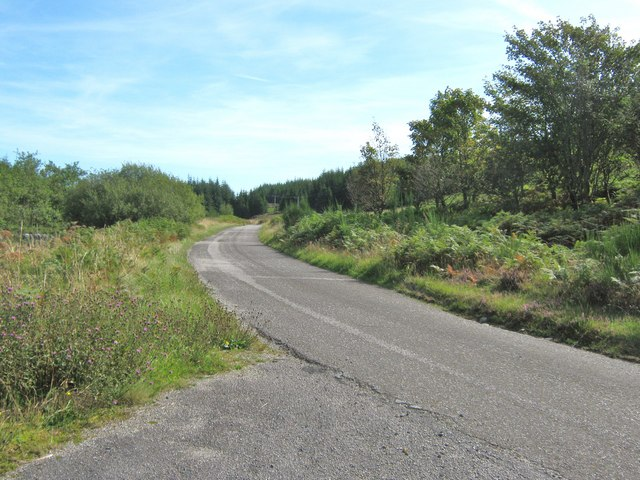

General information
- Location: Gatehouse of Fleet, Dumfries and Galloway; Scotland
- Coordinates: 54.9352°N 4.2736°W
- Grid reference: NX544624
- Platforms: 2

Other information
- Status: Disused

History
- Original company: Portpatrick Railway
- Pre-grouping: Portpatrick and Wigtownshire Joint Railway; Caledonian Railway
- Post-grouping: London, Midland and Scottish Railway British Rail (Scottish Region)

Key dates
- September 1861: Opened as Dromore
- 1 July 1863: Name changed to Gatehouse
- 1 June 1865: Name changed to Dromore for Gatehouse
- 1 September 1866: Name changed back to Gatehouse
- 1 June 1871: Name changed back to Dromore
- 1 January 1912: Name changed to Gatehouse of Fleet
- 5 December 1949: Closed to passengers
- 20 May 1950: Reopened
- 14 June 1965: Closed
Location

Gatehouse of Fleet railway station served the town of Gatehouse of Fleet, in the historic county of Kirkcudbrightshire in the administrative area of Dumfries and Galloway, Scotland from 1861 to 1965 on the Portpatrick and Wigtownshire Joint Railway. The station was over 6 miles from the town.

== History ==
The station opened in September 1861 as Dromore by the Portpatrick and Wigtownshire Joint Railway. It went through a lot of name changes, being renamed to Gatehouse on 1 July 1863, to Dromore for Gatehouse on 1 June 1865, back to Gatehouse on 2 September 1866, back to Dromore on 1 June 1871, and finally to Gatehouse of Fleet on 1 January 1912. The station closed to passengers on 5 December 1949 but reopened on 20 May 1950, only to close along with the line on 14 June 1965.

== In popular culture ==
Lord Peter Wimsey gathers information about his suspects by chatting with station staff and passers-by in the Dorothy L. Sayers novel The Five Red Herrings.

| Preceding station | Disused railways | Following station |
|---|---|---|
| Loch Skerrow Halt; Line and station closed | Portpatrick and Wigtownshire Joint Railway | Creetown; Line and station closed |
