= Creetown railway station =

Disused railway station in Creetown, Dumfries and Galloway

Creetown
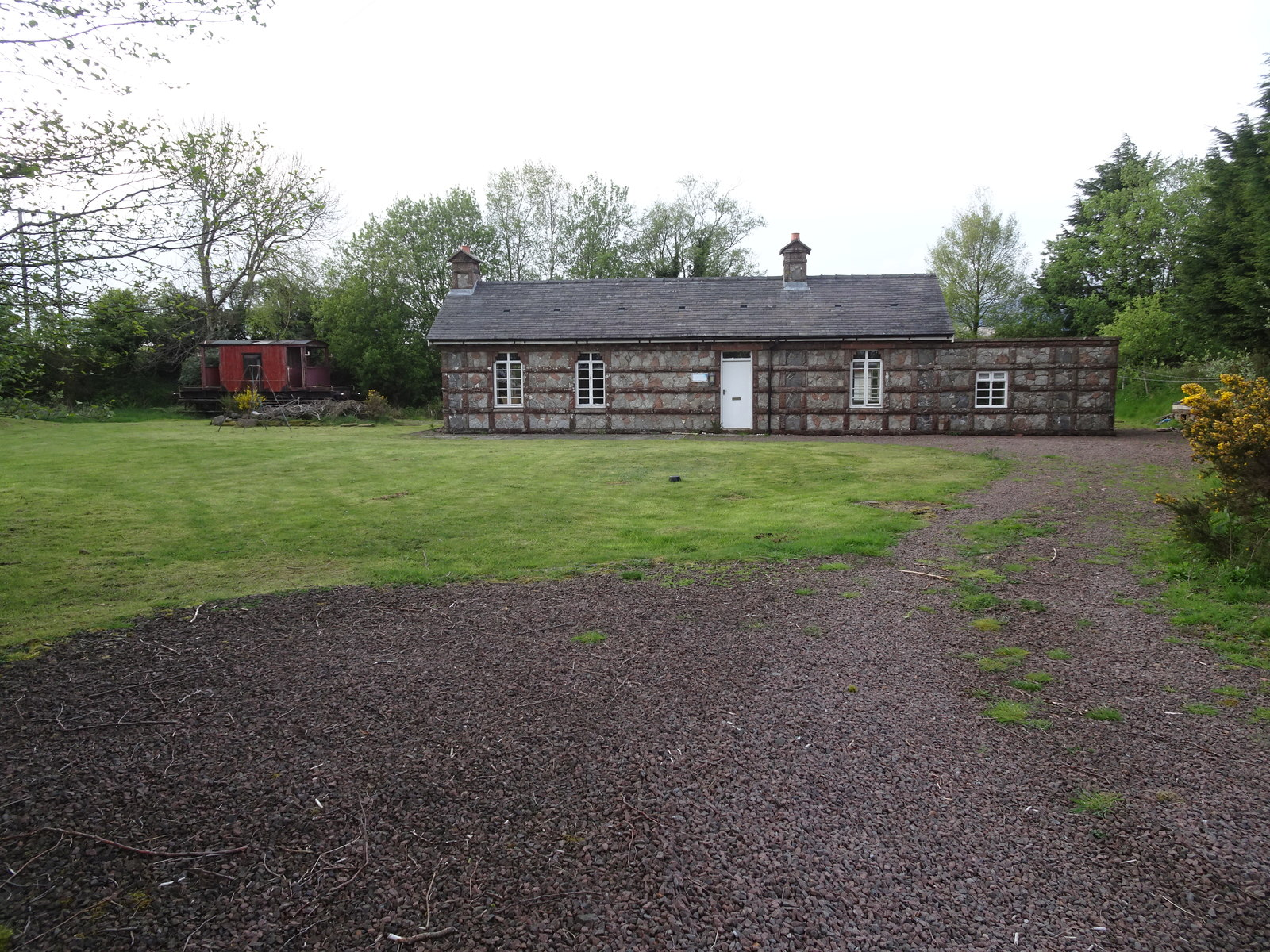
- Station forecourt in 2019

General information
- Location: Creetown, Dumfries and Galloway; Scotland
- Coordinates: 54.911°N 4.38°W
- Grid reference: NX475599
- Platforms: 2

Other information
- Status: Disused

History
- Original company: Portpatrick Railway
- Pre-grouping: Portpatrick and Wigtownshire Joint Railway; Caledonian Railway
- Post-grouping: London, Midland and Scottish Railway British Rail (Scottish Region)

Key dates
- 12 March 1861: Opened
- 14 June 1965: Closed
Location

Creetown railway station served the town of Creetown, in the historic county of Kirkcudbrightshire in the administrative area of Dumfries and Galloway, Scotland from 1861 to 1965 on the Portpatrick and Wigtownshire Joint Railway.

== History ==
The station opened on 12 March 1861 by the Portpatrick and Wigtownshire Joint Railway. The signal box was at the east end of the westbound platform and the goods yard was to the south. The station closed to both passengers and goods traffic on 14 June 1965.

== Station site ==
The station fell into ruins, but in 1990 it was restored with a brake van and part of the platform being kept. The goods building also still exists.

Preceding station	Disused railways	Following station
Gatehouse of Fleet; Line and station closed	Portpatrick and Wigtownshire Joint Railway	Palnure; Line and station closed
