= Loch Skerrow Halt railway station =

Disused railway station in Skerrow, Dumfries and Galloway

Loch Skerrow Halt
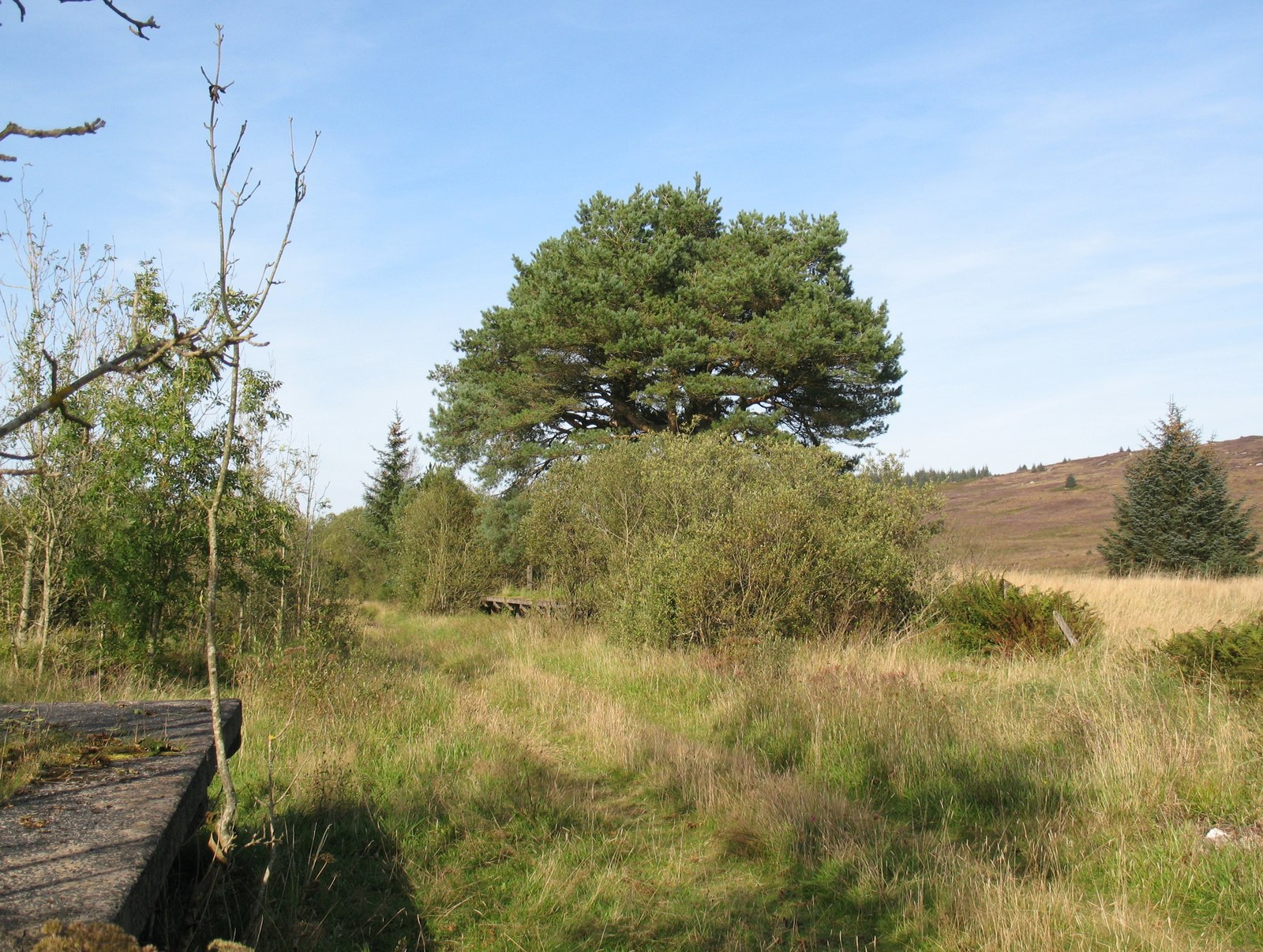
- The site of the station in 2019

General information
- Location: Skerrow, Dumfries and Galloway; Scotland
- Coordinates: 54.9895°N 4.1743°W
- Grid reference: NX609682

Other information
- Status: Disused

History
- Original company: Portpatrick and Wigtownshire Joint Railway

Key dates
- 1871: opened as non-advertised.
- 13 June 1955: Advertised as public station
- 9 September 1963: regular advertised service withdrawn
- 15 June 1965: completely closed
Location

Loch Skerrow Halt railway station was situated in Dumfries and Galloway, Scotland on the Portpatrick and Wigtownshire Joint Railway.

== History ==
The station was opened as a public station on 13 June 1955 by British Railways. It had a siding and a signal box. The purpose of the station was to split the signalling section between New Galloway and Gatehouse of Fleet. With a sparse local population, there was little need for a station, so it closed to regular passengers on 9 September 1963. It remained an unadvertised station and was used occasionally until the line was closed in 1965.

== Popular culture ==
Richard Hannay, the hero of the 1915 novel The Thirty-Nine Steps, by John Buchan, reputedly got off a train here, fearing that he had become the prime suspect in a couple of murders in London.

Preceding station	Disused railways	Following station
New Galloway; Line and station closed	Portpatrick and Wigtownshire Joint Railway	Gatehouse of Fleet; Line and station closed
