= Skerrow =

Coordinates: 54.9895°N 4.1743°W

Loch Skerrow Halt railway station was located at a passing loop on the single-track Portpatrick and Wigtownshire Joint Railway. Although there was no local population, the halt was open from 1955 to 1963, the line being closed in 1965.
