= Dunragit railway station =

Disused railway station in Dunragit, Dumfries and Galloway

Dunragit
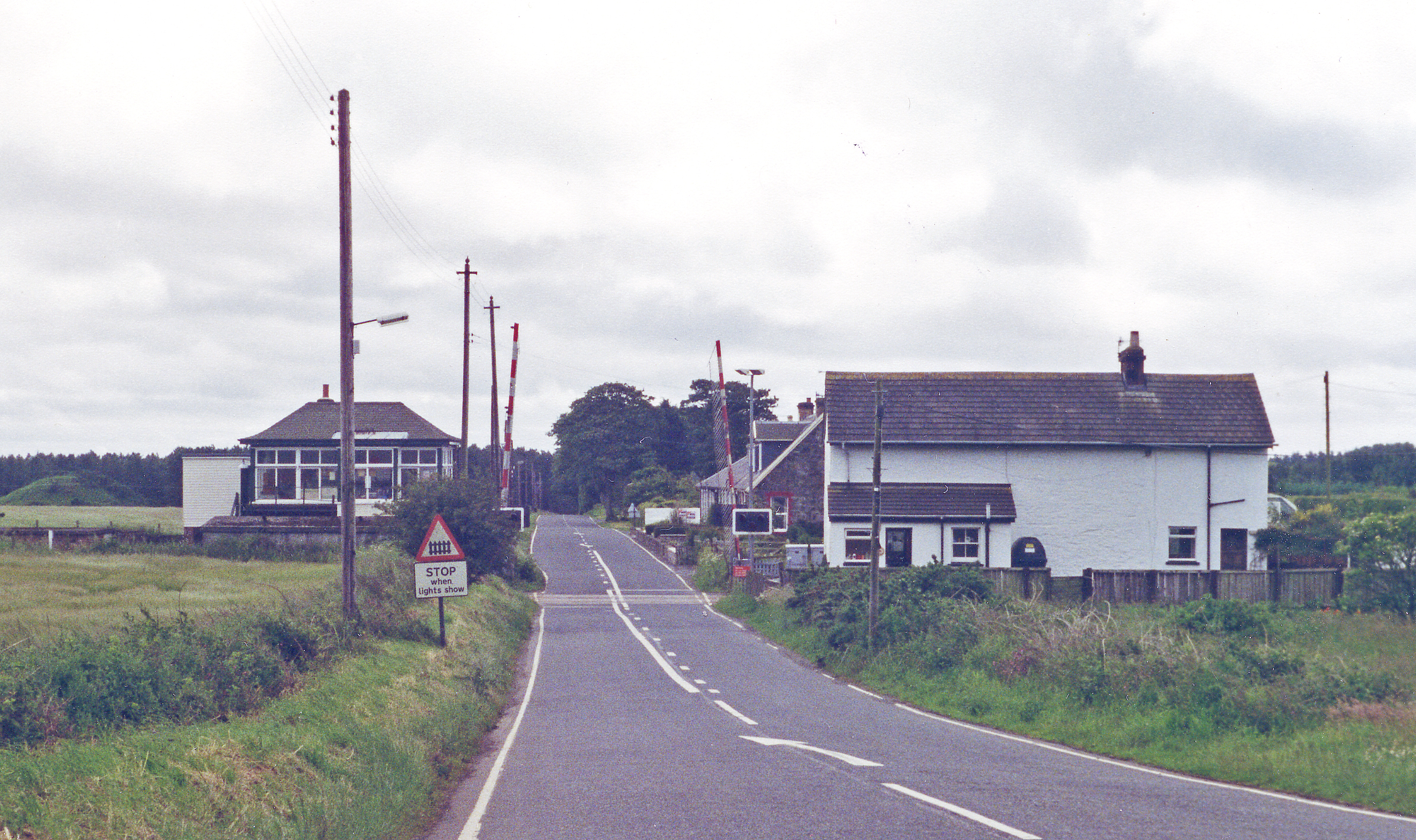
- The site of the station in 1996

General information
- Location: Dunragit, Dumfries and Galloway; Scotland
- Coordinates: 54.8776°N 4.8882°W
- Grid reference: NX148574
- Platforms: 2

Other information
- Status: Disused

History
- Original company: Portpatrick Railway
- Pre-grouping: Portpatrick and Wigtownshire Joint Railway; Caledonian Railway
- Post-grouping: London, Midland and Scottish Railway British Rail (Scottish Region)

Key dates
- 1 July 1861: Opened
- 14 June 1965: Closed
Location

Dunragit railway station served the village of Dunragit, in the historic county of Wigtownshire in the administrative area of Dumfries and Galloway, Scotland from 1861 to 1965 on the Portpatrick and Wigtownshire Joint Railway.

== History ==
The station opened on 1 July 1861 by the Portpatrick and Wigtownshire Joint Railway. The signal box, which opened in 1877, was situated on the westbound platform. It was replaced in 1927 by a new building. The station closed to both passengers and goods traffic on 14 June 1965.

Preceding station	Disused railways	Following station
Glenluce; Line and station closed	Portpatrick and Wigtownshire Joint Railway	Castle Kennedy; Line partially open, station closed
New Luce; Line open, station closed	Girvan and Portpatrick Junction Railway	Castle Kennedy; Line partially open, station closed
