= RAF Castle Kennedy =

Former Royal Air Force station in Dumfries and Galloway, Scotland

RAF Castle Kennedy
- Castle Kennedy, Dumfries and Galloway in Scotland

Site information
- Type: Satellite station
- Owner: Air Ministry
- Operator: Royal Air Force
- Controlled by: RAF Flying Training Command

Location
- Shown within Dumfries and Galloway RAF Castle Kennedy (the United Kingdom)
- Coordinates: 54°53′52″N 4°56′06″W

Site history
- Built: 1940/41
- In use: July 1941 - 15 November 1957
- Battles/wars: European theatre of World War II

Airfield information
Runways
Direction	Length and surface
00/00	Concrete
00/00	Concrete

Royal Air Force Castle Kennedy, or more simply RAF Castle Kennedy, is a former Royal Air Force satellite station located in Castle Kennedy, Dumfries and Galloway, Scotland.

The following units were here at some point:

- No. 2 Squadron RAF
- No. 2 Torpedo Training Unit RAF (December 1942 - September 1943)
- No. 3 Air Gunners School RAF (April - December 1942 & November 1943 - June 1945
- No. 10 Air Gunners School RAF (July - December 1941)
- Detachment of No. 17 Service Flying Training School RAF (November - December 1944)
- No. 104 Storage Sub Unit of No. 57 Maintenance Unit RAF (July 1945 - September 1947)
- No. 2799 Squadron RAF Regiment
- Central Gunnery School RAF (June - December 1941)
