= Stranraer Town railway station =

Former railway station in Scotland

Stranraer Town
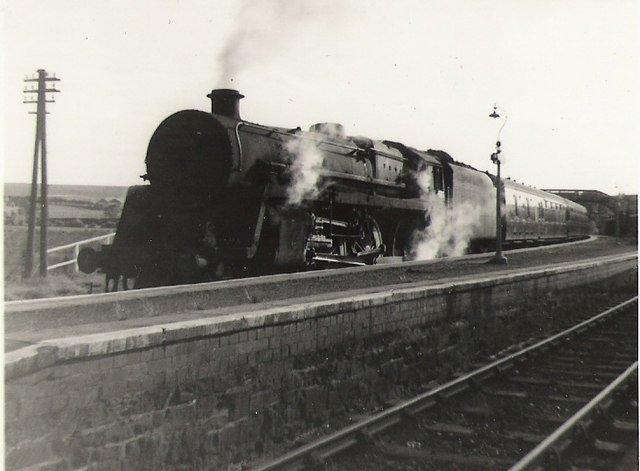

General information
- Location: Scotland
- Coordinates: 54.9006°N 5.0169°W
- Platforms: 1

Other information
- Status: Disused

History
- Pre-grouping: Portpatrick and Wigtownshire Joint Railway

Key dates
- 11 March 1861: Station opened
- 7 March 1966: closed for passengers
- 2009: closed completely
Location

Stranraer Town railway station, located in Wigtownshire, Scotland, served the town of Stranraer and was a station on the Portpatrick and Wigtownshire Joint Railway.

== History ==
Opened on 11 March 1861, when the Castle Douglas to Stranraer Town was opened, it was closed to passengers on 7 March 1966, the year after the closure of the 'Port Road' route to Castle Douglas & Dumfries. Services beyond here to Portpatrick had previously ended in 1950.

Though closed to passenger traffic, the station and surrounding sidings remained in regular use as a freight depot until the end of Speedlink wagonload traffic in 1993. The last trains were steel trains from Tees Yard. All regular freight traffic from here to Northern Ireland via the ferries subsequently ceased and the depot was formally closed in 2009. The sidings remained in-situ, heavily overgrown, until 2015 when lifting commenced and by 2017 it had been completed.

== See also ==
- Stranraer Harbour railway station
