= Cairnryan Harbour =

Coordinates: 54.974232°N 5.030052°W

- Location within Dumfries and Galloway
- Council area: Dumfries and Galloway
- Lieutenancy area: Wigtown
- Country: Scotland
- Sovereign state: United Kingdom
- Post town: STRANRAER
- Postcode district: DG9
- Dialling code: 01776
- Police: Scotland
- Fire: Scottish
- Ambulance: Scottish
- UK Parliament: Dumfries and Galloway
- Scottish Parliament: Galloway and Upper Nithsdale

Cairnryan Harbour is a roll-on ferry terminal on Loch Ryan in south west Scotland north of Stranraer.

In World War II it was developed as an emergency west coast port facility, in case Liverpool or the Clyde ports were put out of commission by enemy action.

== Portpatrick at first ==
Portpatrick, on the western side of the Rinns, (Note: Sometimes spelt Rhins) had long served as a port for a short sea route from Donaghadee in Northern Ireland. Since 1620 the route had been used for importing cattle and horses, and for the transfer of military personnel. Later mail transit for the Post Office mails developed, by 1838 8,000 to 10,000 letters passed through the port daily, brought by coach from both Dumfries and Glasgow.

However the small harbour was cramped and exposed to westerly winds. Although Government funding had been promised for improvements space for substantial expansion was limited. Also the development of more attractive alternative routes, in particular from Holyhead to Kingstown, (renamed Dún Laoghaire) led to a loss of commitment to Portpatrick.

== Next Stranraer ==
In 1857 the Portpatrick Railway was authorised, its primary objective being to connect Portpatrick and Carlisle for the carriage of mails, passengers and goods. When it became obvious that Portpatrick Harbour was not going to be improved, the railway concentrated on Stranraer as its ferry port. Stranraer is at the southern end of Loch Ryan; although the passage to Irish ports is longer, Stranraer was a more spacious and better-sheltered location, so it became the dominant port for transits to Northern Ireland.

== World War II ==
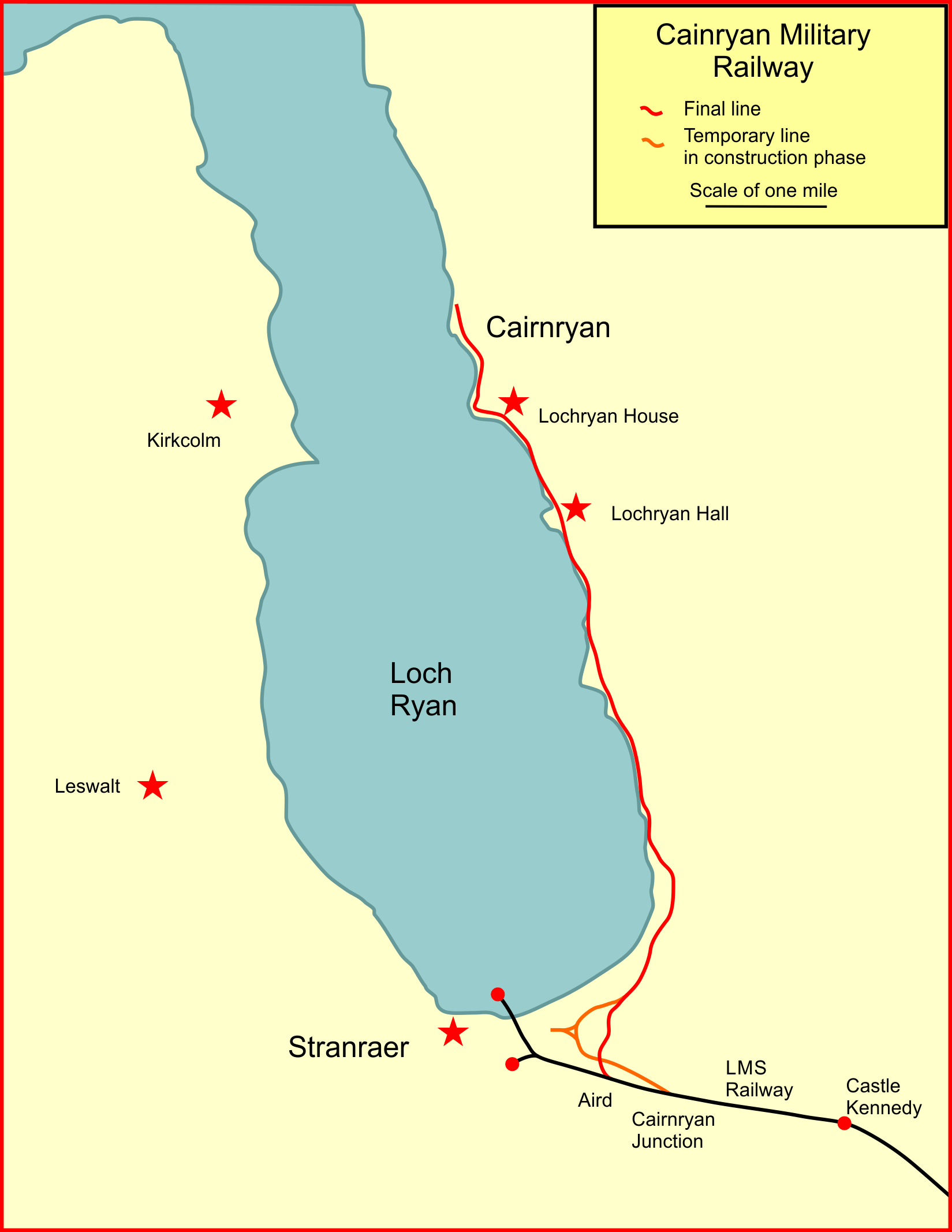
Cairnryan Military Railway system

In 1940, consideration was given to the provision of a west coast port for use in the event of Liverpool or Glasgow being put out action. This was a large undertaking, planned to take up the full capacity of one of the large commercial ports. Faslane on the Gare Loch was also considered, but it was determined to develop the location that became Cairnryan on the eastern shore of Loch Ryan, some distance north of Stranraer.

This involved considerable civil engineering work and 4,000 military and other personnel worked on the project. Many of the military staff were American, at that stage the USA had not entered the war and thus they wore civilian clothing. Work began on 20 January 1941.

== Cairnryan Military Railway ==
A siding from the main line was laid in from a ground frame connection about a mile east of Stranraer Harbour Junction. The first occupants of the siding were five dormitory coaches, LMS camping coach 46059 and a canteen van, for which an ex-Highland Railway 4-4-0 LMS no 14382, Loch Moy, supplied steam heat, though minus its internal machinery. This siding expanded into a large yard of ten parallel roads, ultimately 6 1/4 miles long, curved round to the shore of the loch.

A signalbox was erected at the junction and opened on 11 October 1942.

Five groups of sidings and 47 roads were constructed, as well as a large engine shed and coaling stage. The military railway connected with the main line at Cairnryan Junction, about a mile (about 2 km) east of Stranraer, aligned to permit through running to and from the east. The final alignment of the railway after the construction phase was altered in the Stranraer area, and the main line connection was later made at Aird, somewhat nearer Stranraer. The railway was opened in July 1942, and the port itself was ready in July 1943.

A timetabled passenger operation was in place, and Gill reproduces a photograph of a railway ticket, marked "C.& S.Railway" (i.e. Cairnyan and Stranraer Railway) (officially a military recreational travel permit) the return fare was 2 1/2d. The ticket is marked "Passenger travels at his own risk."

The preparations for the Normandy landings took the focus of activity to the south of England, and Cairnryan was for the time being reduced to a care and maintenance status. In fact only eighteen fully laden ocean-going vessels used the port.

=== Royal visit ===
At the end of June 1942, King George VI and Queen Elizabeth paid a visit to Northern Ireland, and it was arranged that they would travel via the Cairnryan Military Railway and the port. The full Royal Train did not go down the CMR; a two-coach train was provided: the Caledonian Railway officers' saloon and a newly decorated first brake. Stranraer got out its best class 2P 4-4-0 locomotive no 600, and they cleaned, polished and scrubbed to perfection.

Two days later the king and queen returned, and 2P no 614 was borrowed from Dumfries. The royal passengers transferred to the main line train at the temporary platform at the junction.

== After the war ==
After the end of World War II, the facility was used to load superfluous ammunition, brought to the port by rail, onto army landing craft for disposal at sea - a hazardous task, which took the lives of several at the port (including on one occasion eight young servicemen killed on the North Deep Water Wharf when accidentally mishandling a case of fuses), while the long-term and wider risks of such dumping have only later become more evident.

Smith describes the railway operation on the military line:

They brought these gas shells in standard trains of 32 wagons. The WD people worked them from Cairnryan Junction down the 5½ miles of rather lumpy line to the new port. Authority thought that 32-wagon trains were uneconomical, so they got an Austerity 2-10-0 [locomotive] down to Cairnryan, and worked the gas shells down from the junction in trains of 64. And the 64-wagon train got away with them! [The wagons overpowered the braking effort of the locomotive and brake van on the gradient.] Well, I've talked of various exciting happenings in that neighbourhood, but I think that 64 [loaded wagons] of poison gas behind your tender—and you can't stop—is quite enough excitement for any normal driver for quite a time.

At the end of the war, the Atlantic U-boat fleet surrendered in Loch Ryan and was anchored in the port before being towed to the North Channel and scuttled. This activity was codenamed Operation Deadlight.

After the end of any strategic objective, Ship breaking became the main industry; the great British aircraft carriers HMS Centaur, HMS Bulwark, HMS Eagle, and HMS Ark Royal were all sent there for decommissioning, as well as a number of other vessels including HMS Mohawk and HMS Blake. As recently as 1990, Soviet Navy submarines were being dismantled there for scrap.

The railway and the main line connection at Cairnryan Junction remained available for use for some years, but the junction with the main line at Aird had ceased to be functional by 1960. The decision was taken to remove the facility; the final rail movement was part of the dismantling process in 1967.

A single pier remains, one was dismantled and another was destroyed in an ammunition explosion shortly after the war. The remaining pier is in a state of disrepair and fenced off to the public after partially collapsing in the 1990s when it was being used to load stone from the nearby Croach Farm quarry in Cairnryan. Despite this many anglers use it as it offers access to seafish such as mackerel, cod, dogfish, mullet and plaice.

== Commercial ferries ==
In the 1970s the ferry service between Stranraer and Larne in Northern Ireland was operated by British Railways. As private motoring and road transport became dominant at the expense of classic rail-ferry-rail transits, the significance of Stranraer as the ferry terminal, adjacent to the railway station, declined, and a private sector operator, P&O Ferries started operating roll-on roll-off ferries on a route from Cairnryan in 1973. A new link span was built for the purpose, and the port operation was cheaper than at Stranraer; moreover the sea transit was shorter.

As the importance of rail passenger connections further declined, Stena Line also transferred to Cairnryan opening a new terminal at Old House Point in 2011.

Preceding station	Ferry	Following station
Terminus	Stena Line; Ferry	Belfast
Terminus	P&O Ferries; Ferry	Larne

== Rail connections ==
The nearest station is Stranraer with a bus connection from the port connecting with trains to Glasgow Central along the Glasgow South Western Line.

There is also a coach link between here and Ayr railway station going up the Ayrshire Coast Line, by a company named Dodds of Troon.

== See also ==
- Cairnryan
