= Portpatrick railway station =

Former railway station in Scotland

Portpatrick
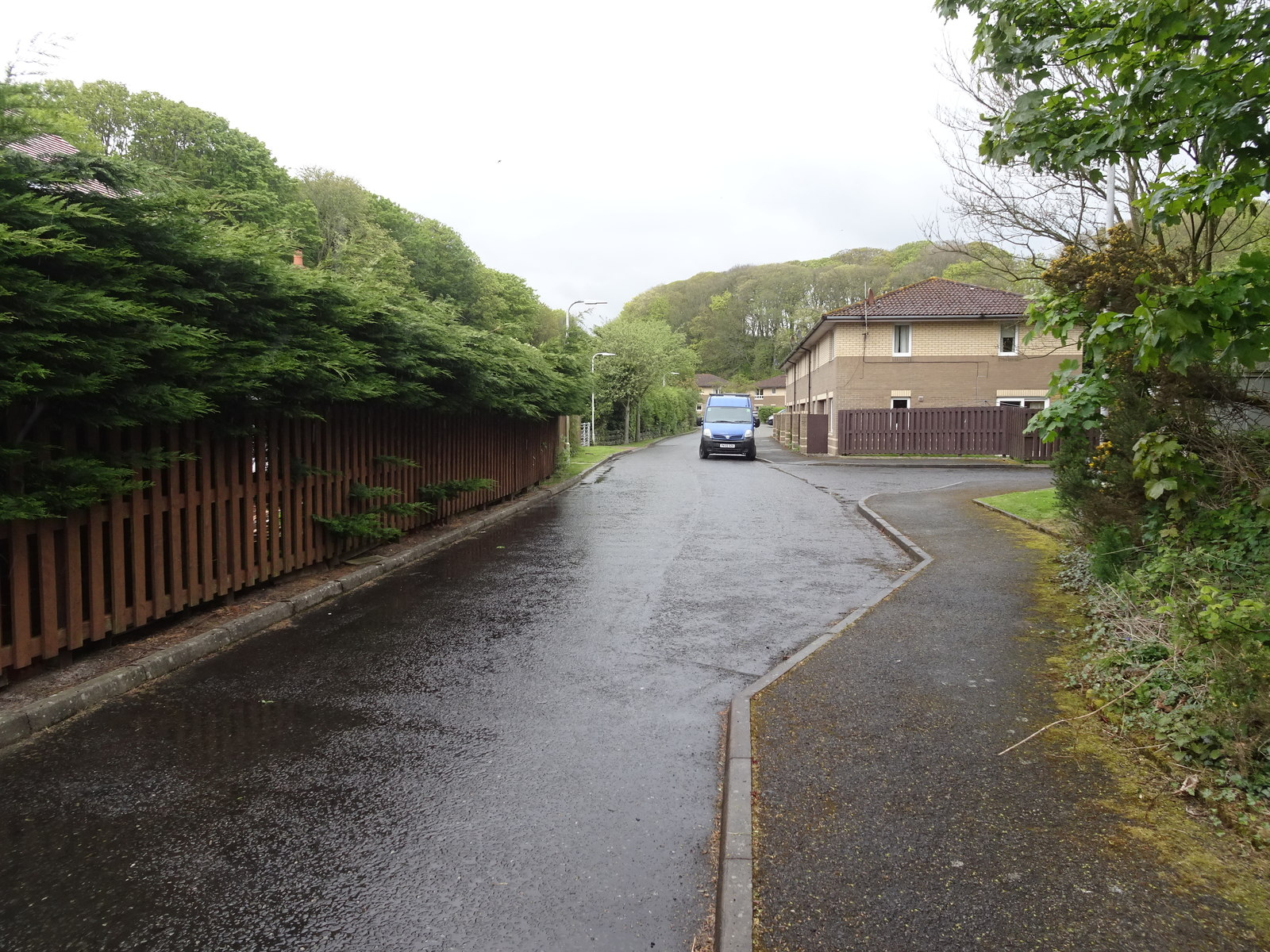
- The site of the station in 2019

General information
- Location: Dumfries and Galloway; Scotland
- Coordinates: 54°50′42″N 5°6′44″W
- Grid reference: NX002544
- Platforms: 1

Other information
- Status: Disused

History
- Original company: Portpatrick Railway
- Pre-grouping: Portpatrick and Wigtownshire Joint Committee
- Post-grouping: London, Midland and Scottish Railway

Key dates
- 28 August 1862: Opened
- 1868: Traffic to Portpatrick harbour ceased
- 6 February 1950: Closed
Location

Portpatrick railway station was a railway station serving the village of Portpatrick, Dumfries & Galloway, Scotland. Opened in 1862 the station served the village until the line between Portpatrick and Stranraer closed in 1950.

== Construction ==
The development of railways in the south west of Scotland came later than much of the rest of the country and it was not until 1857 that a line was authorised. The company entitled the Portpatrick Railway was to run from Dumfries to Portpatrick with a short branch to the harbour at Stranraer. Portpatrick was chosen as the terminus because it is the closest point to Ireland on the British mainland and the promoters of the line wished to develop the mail traffic across this sea route.

Construction of the line between Stranraer and Portpatrick did not start until 1860, priority having been given to the line from Dumfries but as the act authorising the company placed a stricture on the company forbidding the payment of any dividend until the line to Portpatrick and the harbour there, attention moved to the line and it was ready for inspection by the Board of Trade Inspector in August 1862. With the line approved the station opened for traffic on 28 August 1862.

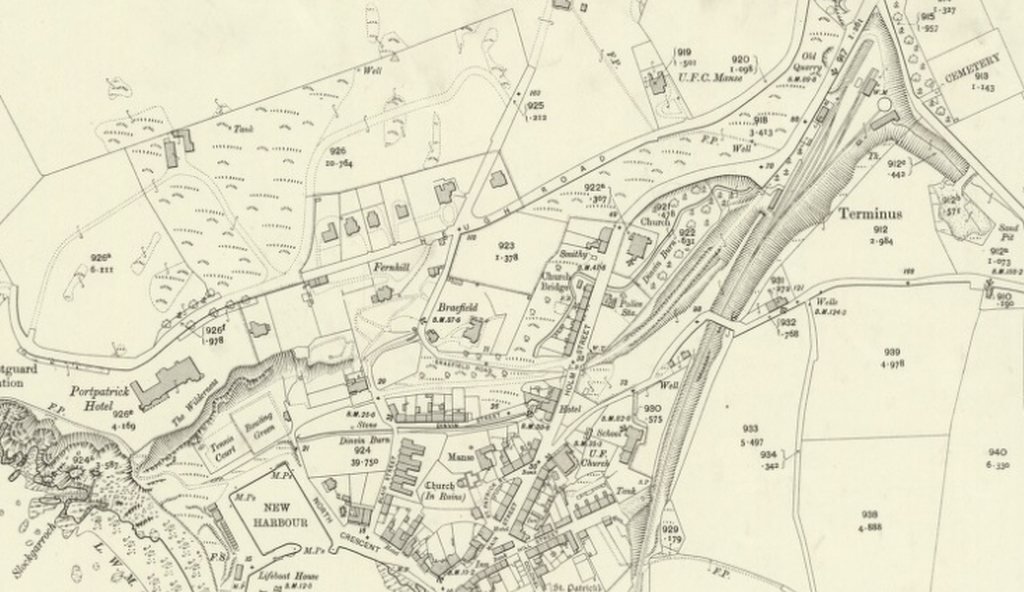
1908 Ordnance Survey map of Portpatrick station. The abandoned route to the harbour can be seen on the left hand side

The line ran from Stranraer in a generally south-westerly direction before curving through almost a half circle to run into the village on a north-east axis to the station site which was hewn out of the hillside above the village. A single platform was provided along with goods facilities and a small engine shed and turntable. The station was host to a LMS caravan in 1935 and 1936 followed by two caravans from 1937 to 1939.

=== Harbour branch ===
Part of the approved route of the line was a short branch descending from the station to the north harbour to allow for the transfer of passengers and mails to packet steamers operating between Portpatrick and Donaghadee however the Admiralty who had responsibility for port works did not share the enthusiasm for development of mail services with the result that although the railway line was built there was no regular shipping service for trains to connect with. Despite extensive correspondence between the railway company and the Admiralty the proposed development works to the harbour were not carried out although the railway company did receive financial compensation instead. Various short-lived attempts to introduce a regular service to Donaghadee but none were successful and with the failure of the Donaghadee and Portpatrick Short Sea Steam Packet Company service after only a few weeks in 1868 the railway company abandoned the line from the harbour to the station.

The line to the harbour wasn't easy to work, it was quite steep and trains of only short length could be run due to the awkward layout at Portpatrick station where the harbour line deviated via a spur at the buffer end of the platform.

== Services ==
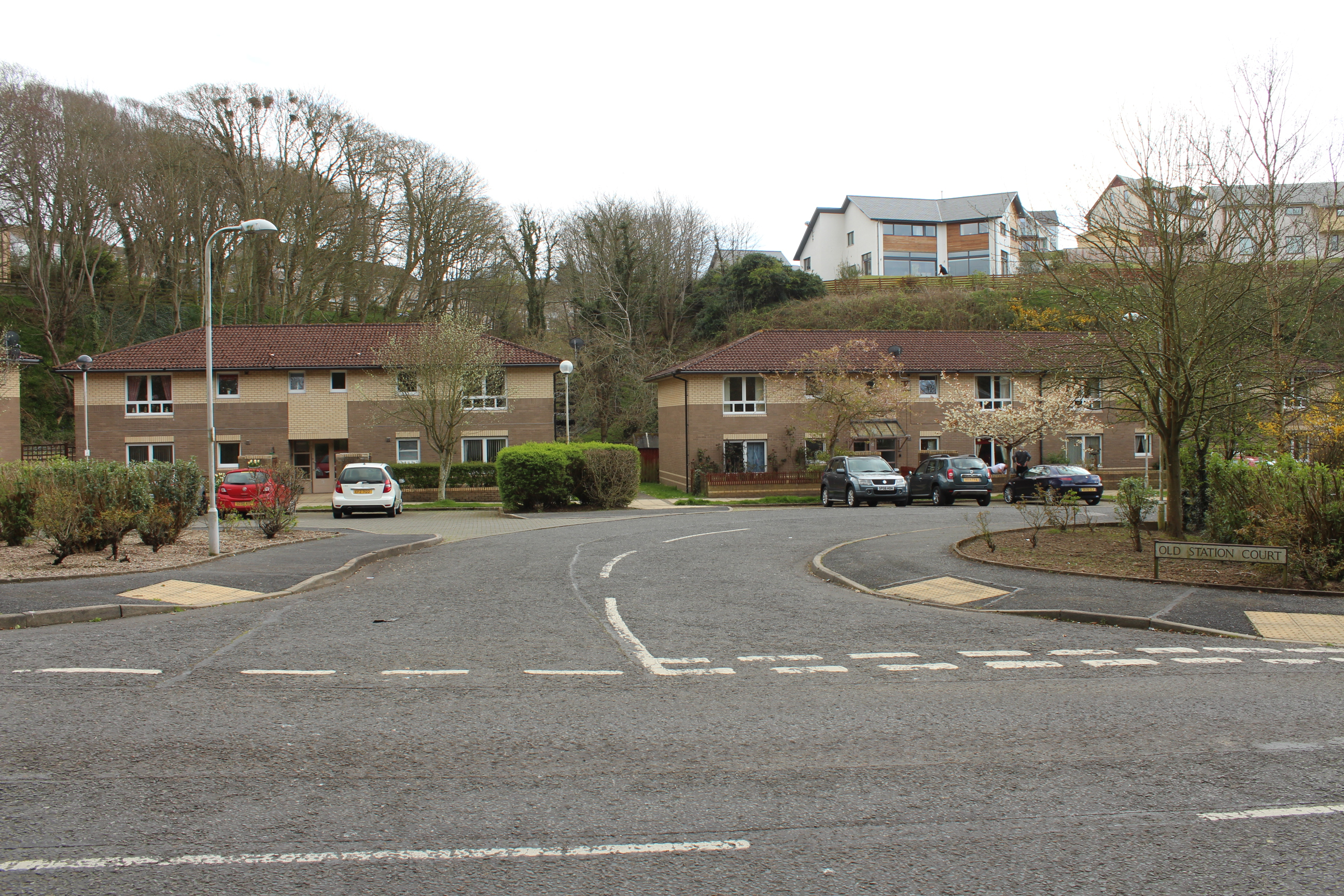
The site of the railway station, now a housing estate, photographed in April 2017

Passenger services varied from three to six trains per day between Portpatrick and Stranraer Town. Virtually all services terminated at Stranraer and passengers travelling further would change at Stranraer for services to Carlisle or Glasgow.

== Closure ==
Services from Portpatrick were an early closure of British Railways management; buses to and from Stranraer were more frequent and faster than the train services so the station closed on 6 February 1950 with all passenger and goods services withdrawn. The track was lifted soon after and the station site is now a housing estate.
