= Castle Kennedy =

Village in Dumfries and Galloway, Scotland

Coordinates: 54.9077°N 4.9487°W

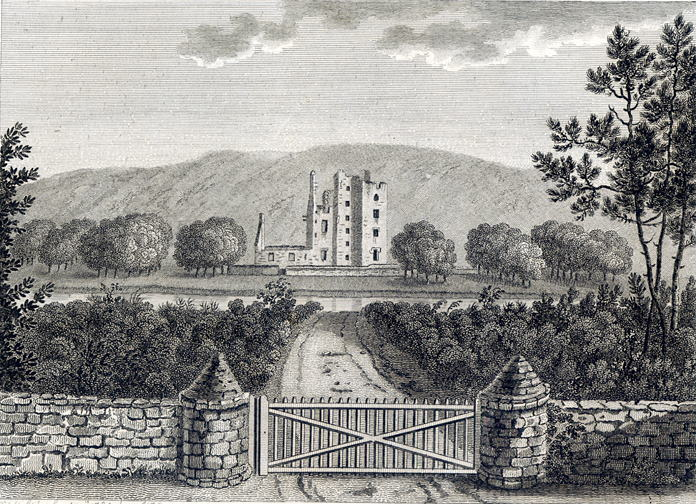
- Castle Kennedy by Francis Grose (1789)

- Location within Dumfries and Galloway
- OS grid reference: NX113603
- Council area: Dumfries and Galloway
- Lieutenancy area: Wigtown
- Country: Scotland
- Sovereign state: United Kingdom
- Post town: Stranraer
- Postcode district: DG9
- Dialling code: 01776
- Police: Scotland
- Fire: Scottish
- Ambulance: Scottish
- UK Parliament: Dumfries and Galloway
- Scottish Parliament: Galloway and West Dumfries

Designations

Inventory of Gardens and Designed Landscapes in Scotland
- Official name: Castle Kennedy
- Designated: 30 June 1987
- Reference no.: GDL00093

Castle Kennedy is a small village 3 miles (4.8 km) east of Stranraer in Dumfries and Galloway, south-west Scotland. It is on the A75 road, and is within the civil parish of Inch. The village is to the south of the Lochinch Castle estate, which includes the ruins of the 17th-century Castle Kennedy, as well as Castle Kennedy Gardens which are open to the public.

Prior to the Reformation the two lochs within the Lochinch estate, Black Loch and White Loch, were together known as Loch Crindil. A small island in the White Loch was the site of a church, which may have given the parish its name: "the Inch", from the Scottish Gaelic: innis, meaning "island".

Castle Kennedy was built in 1607 as a mansion house by the Earl of Cassilis, on the site of an older castle. It was acquired in 1677 by Sir John Dalrymple, later the Earl of Stair, though the house burned down in 1716. The 2nd Earl retained the ruin as a focal point for new formal gardens laid out from 1720 to 1730, following his time as ambassador at Versailles upon which it was based. The earl used troops to landscape the estate, including several focal features such as "The Giant's Grave", "Mount Marlborough" and the "Dancing Green".

In the 1860s the 9th and 10th Earls built Lochinch Castle on the estate, in a "Franco-Scottish style", and partially restored the 18th-century gardens that had fallen into disrepair. The estate remains the property of the Earl of Stair, and Castle Kennedy Gardens are open to the public. Restoration of the gardens continues. Because of the Gulf Stream and the proximity of the sea on two sides, the gardens enjoy a mild climate which permits the cultivation of a range of rhododendrons and other plants not often seen in Scotland.

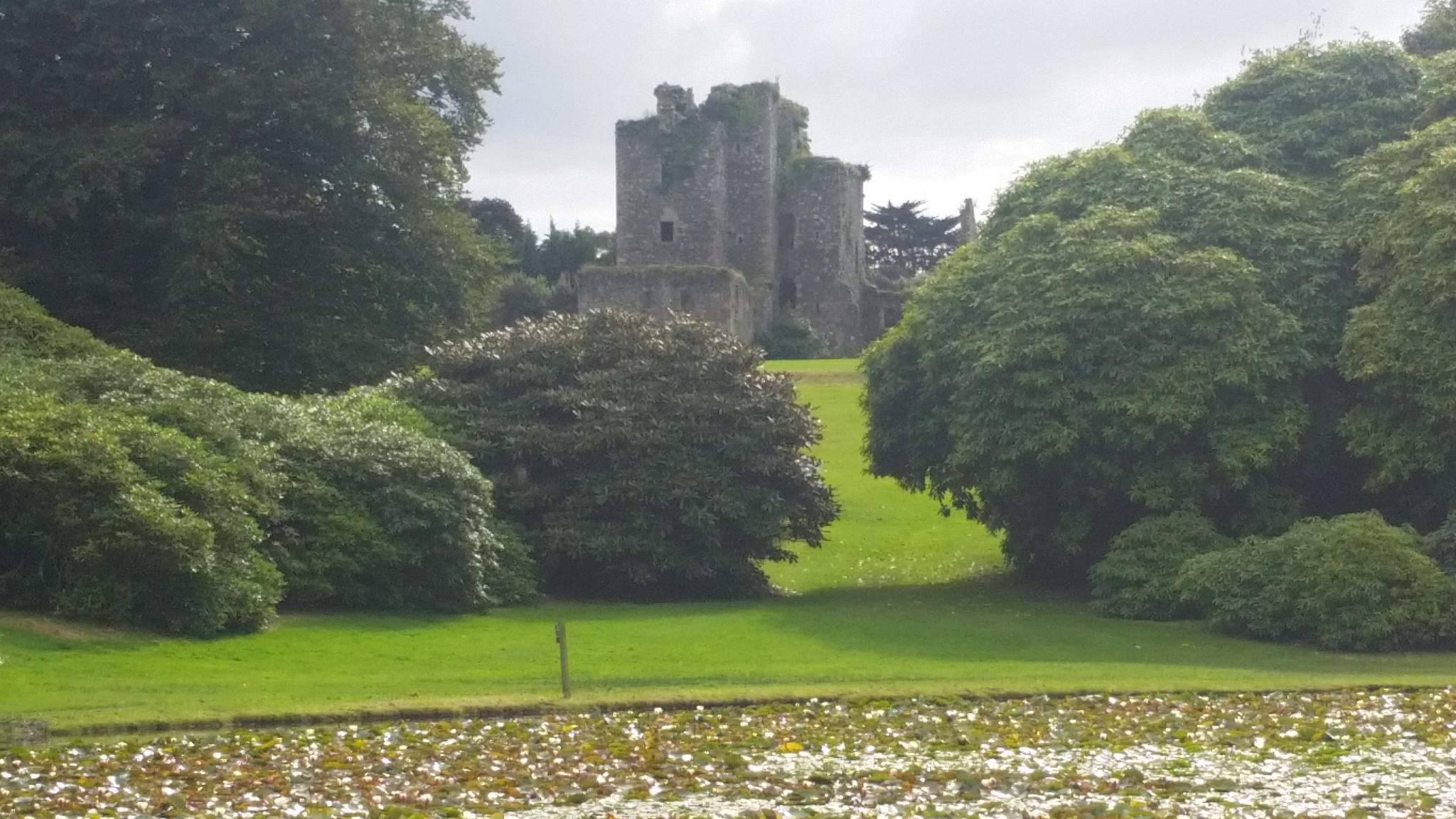
2017

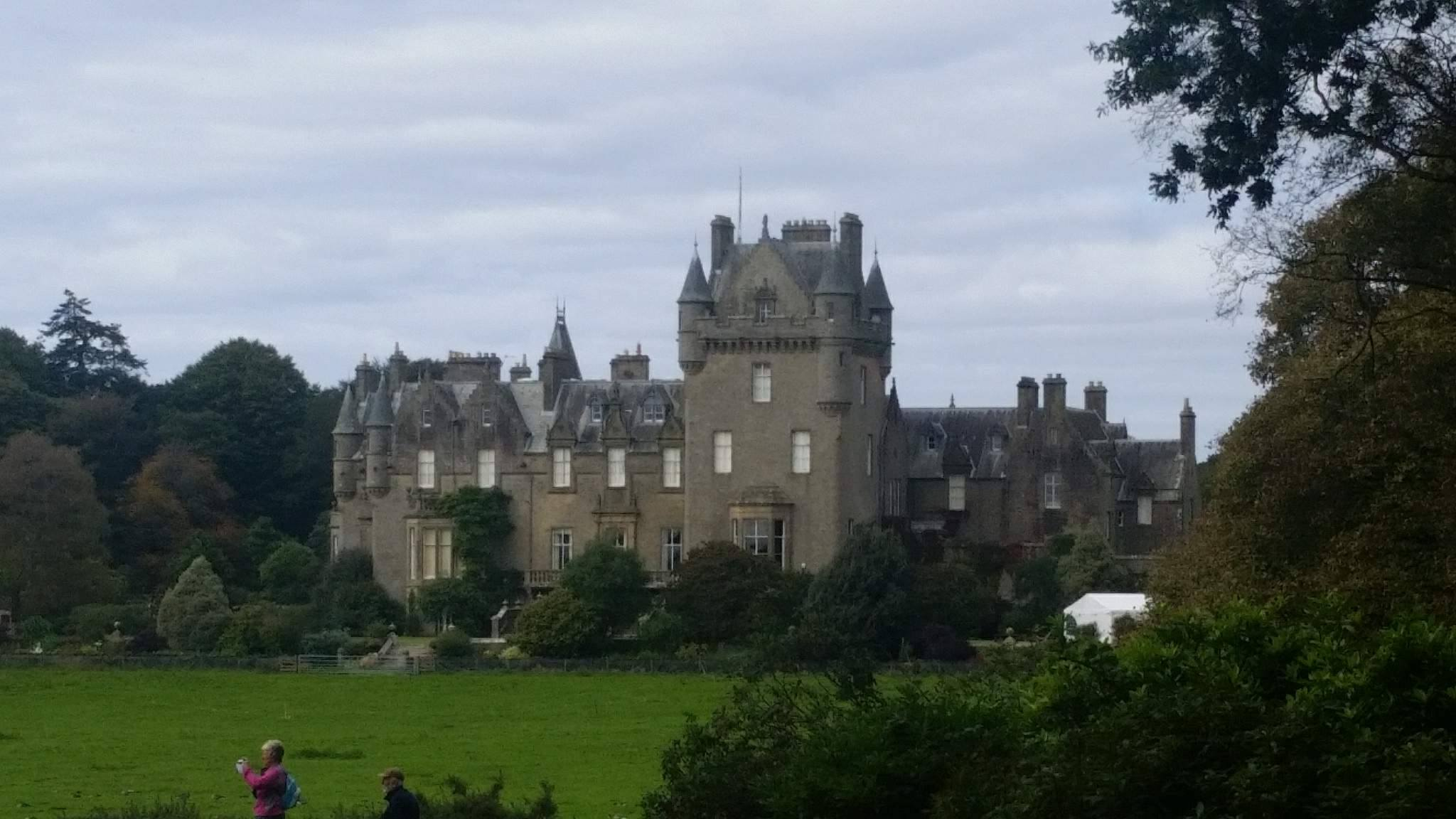
Lochinch Castle

Castle Kennedy had a station on the Portpatrick and Wigtownshire Joint Railway, which opened in 1861 and closed in 1965. The station building is now a house, and the closest station is at Stranraer. During the Second World War an airfield was constructed to the east of the village: it operated from 1941 to 1945, and the runways remain in place. The village has its own primary school, with a roll of 38 pupils.

The former RAF Castle Kennedy is located nearby.
