= Stranraer railway station =

Railway station in Dumfries and Galloway, Scotland

Stranraer Scottish Gaelic: An t-Sròn Reamhar
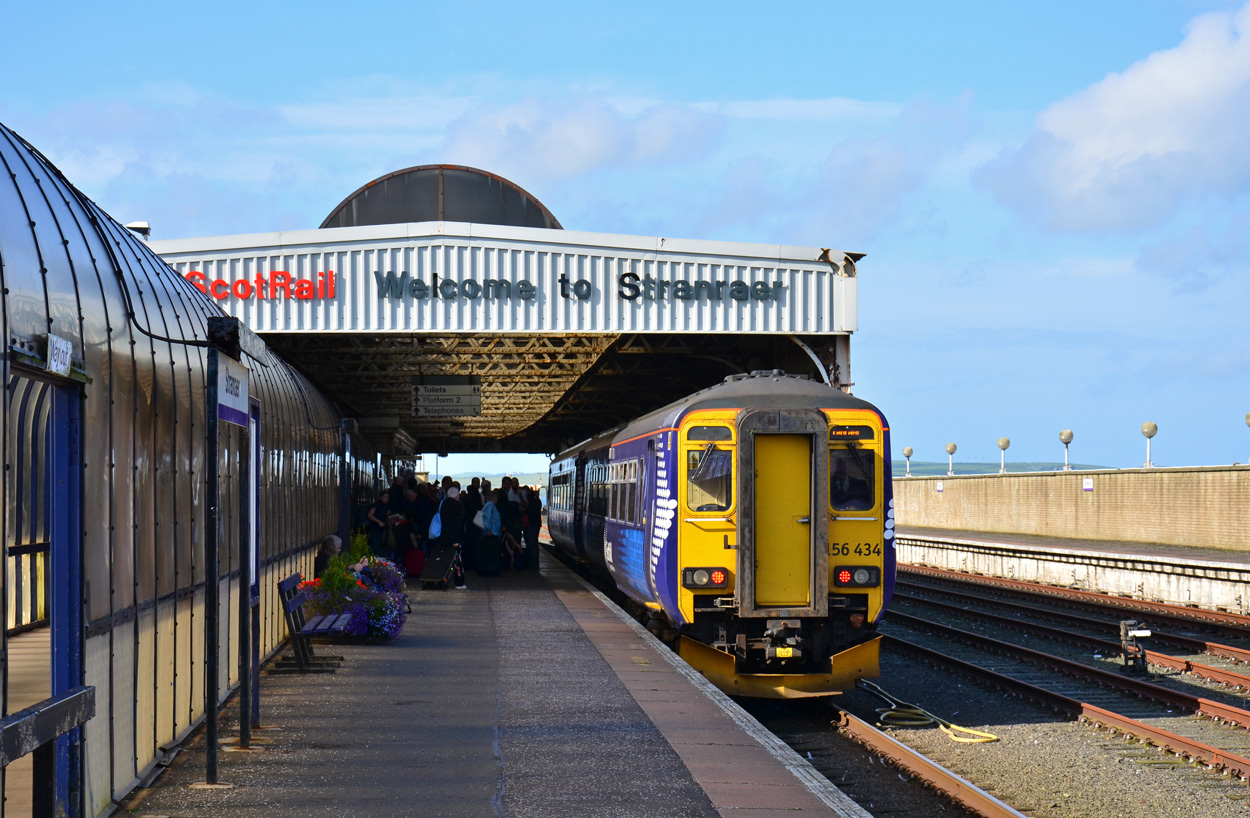
- 156 434 at Stranraer

General information
- Location: Stranraer, Dumfries and Galloway; Scotland
- Coordinates: 54.9093°N 5.0249°W
- Grid reference: NX062613
- Manager: ScotRail
- Platforms: 2 (1 in use)

Other information
- Station code: STR

History
- Original company: Portpatrick Railway
- Pre-grouping: Portpatrick and Wigtownshire Joint Railway
- Post-grouping: London Midland and Scottish Railway

Key dates
- 1 October 1862: Opened as Stranraer Harbour
- by 1996: Renamed Stranraer

Passengers
- 2021/22: ▲31,858
- 2022/23: ▲40,138
- 2023/24: ▼31,866
- 2024/25: ▼30,196
- 2025/26: ▲48,792
Location
Notes
- Passenger statistics from the Office of Rail and Road

Stranraer railway station (formerly known as Stranraer Harbour railway station) is a railway station that serves the town of Stranraer, Dumfries and Galloway, Scotland. The station is measured 53 miles 77 chains (86.8 km) from the former signal box at Castle Douglas and is the terminus of the Glasgow South Western Line. It has two platforms (although only one of these is currently in use). Stranraer station remains owned by Stena Line and not Network Rail.

The station is located on the east pier of Stranraer Harbour, formerly used by ferry services to Northern Ireland. Aside from serving Stranraer, the next nearest town, Newton Stewart, is 20 miles away, and it is closer to Belfast than Glasgow.

== History ==
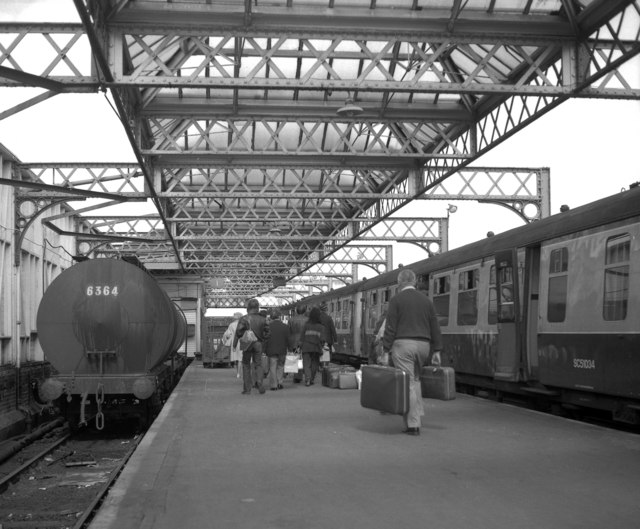
Passengers have just arrived on the train and transfer to the ferry in 1978

The station was opened on 1 October 1862 by the Portpatrick Railway; however, the current station buildings date from 1877 under the Portpatrick Railways Act 1877, when the modern-day line towards Girvan opened. The line to Portpatrick closed in 1950.

A ferry service had commenced by 1861 but passengers made their way from Stranraer Town station to the steamers, not Stranraer Harbour station. The first daily ferry service started on 1 October 1862 to Larne and was provided by PS Briton. However, it only lasted until 31 December 1863. Originally named Stranraer Harbour, the station name was simplified to Stranraer by 1996. The station was reconstructed in 1984.

The Stena Line ferry service to Larne was moved to Belfast on 12 November 1995. Stena stopped serving Stranraer on 21 November 2011, having invested £200 million on a new route to Loch Ryan Port, at Cairnryan. ScotRail has cut services to Stranraer since the ferry services started departing from further up Loch Ryan and ferry passengers who previously travelled by rail now face a long journey to Ayr by bus.

The line that runs from Stranraer station was temporarily closed between August and November 2018 due to the closures of platform 3 and 4 of Ayr station. This was caused by the adjacent hotel building that was found to be structurally unsound, which was then subsequently secured and services then resumed.

== Facilities ==
There is a waiting room, a ticket office and toilets at the station. There is also a car park, bike storage, waiting room, a help point and a live departure screen.

== Passenger volume ==
Passenger volume at Stranraer
	2004–05	2005–06	2006–07	2007–08	2008–09	2009–10	2010–11	2011–12	2012–13	2013–14	2014–15	2015–16	2016–17	2017–18	2018–19	2019–20	2020–21	2021–22	2022–23	2023–24	2024–25
Entries and exits	53,190	55,377	54,149	51,539	50,040	50,274	57,276	45,388	45,292	45,530	51,634	53,968	62,282	69,964	56,386	65,862	9,014	31,858	40,138	31,866	30,196

The statistics cover twelve month periods that start in April.

== Services ==
7 days a week, there are five trains per day to Ayr (two of which extend beyond Ayr to Kilmarnock and one of those continues to Glasgow). On Mondays to Saturdays the frequency is very uneven with gaps of between two and four hours at certain times of the day. On a Sunday all trains run to Ayr only and depart every two hours.

Preceding station	National Rail	Following station
Terminus	ScotRail; Glasgow South Western Line	Barrhill
	Historical railways	
Terminus	Caledonian, Glasgow & South Western, Midland and London North Western Railways; Portpatrick and Wigtownshire Joint Railway	Castle Kennedy; Line open; station closed

== Future proposals ==
On 21 November 2011, Stena Line operations ceased at Stranraer and were transferred a few miles up Loch Ryan to Cairnryan. Since then, the South West of Scotland Transport Partnership have funded a feasibility study as to whether the station could be relocated nearer to the town centre, currently a 15 minute walk away, supported by Transport Scotland and Network Rail.

In 2026 the Scottish Green Party mentioned in their manifesto that they would put forth proposals to link it to Dumfries railway station.

== Cultural references ==
The station was featured in Episode 54 of All the Stations in 2017. Presenters Geoff Marshall and Vicki Pipe highlighted the now-defunct ferry terminal and the debilitated state of the current station.

== Community rail ==
The station, as with most other stations across Ayrshire, including up to Kilmarnock, is part of the South West Scotland Community Rail Partnership.

== Connections ==
=== Bus link to Cairnryan ferry terminals ===
In September 2013 a bus link, route 350 operated by McLeans, was introduced between the railway station and the P&O Ferries and Stena Line ferry terminals at Cairnryan, operating on all days except Sundays. The bus also serves the centre of Stranraer. In 2017 this service was rerouted and no longer calls at Stranraer station.

== See also ==
- Stranraer Town railway station

== Bibliography ==
- Baker, S.K. (1980) [1977]. Rail Atlas of Britain (3rd ed.). Oxford: Oxford Publishing Company. ISBN 0-86093-106-4.
- Baker, S.K. (2007) [1977]. Rail Atlas - Great Britain & Ireland (11th ed.). Oxford Publishing Company. ISBN 978-0-86093-602-2.
- Baker, Stuart K. (1996) [1977]. Rail Atlas Great Britain & Ireland (8th ed.). Yeovil: Oxford Publishing Co. ISBN 0-86093-534-5. T534.
- Brailsford, Martyn, ed. (December 2017) [1987]. Railway Track Diagrams 1: Scotland & Isle of Man (6th ed.). Frome: Trackmaps. ISBN 978-0-9549866-9-8.
- Butt, R. V. J. (October 1995). The Directory of Railway Stations: details every public and private passenger station, halt, platform and stopping place, past and present (1st ed.). Sparkford: Patrick Stephens Ltd. ISBN 978-1-85260-508-7. OCLC 60251199. OL 11956311M.
- Caton, Peter (2018). Remote Stations. Leicestershire: Matador. ISBN 978-1-78901-408-2.
- Fryer, C.E.J. (1991). The Portpatrick and Wigtownshire Railways. Oakwood Press. ISBN 0-85361-408-3.
- Jowett, Alan (March 1989). Jowett's Railway Atlas of Great Britain and Ireland: From Pre-Grouping to the Present Day (1st ed.). Sparkford: Patrick Stephens Ltd. ISBN 978-1-85260-086-0. OCLC 22311137.
- Thorne, H. D. (2005). Rails to Portpatrick. Wigtown: G.C. Books. ISBN 1-872350-63-1.
