= Portpatrick and Wigtownshire Joint Railways =

Former railway line in Scotland

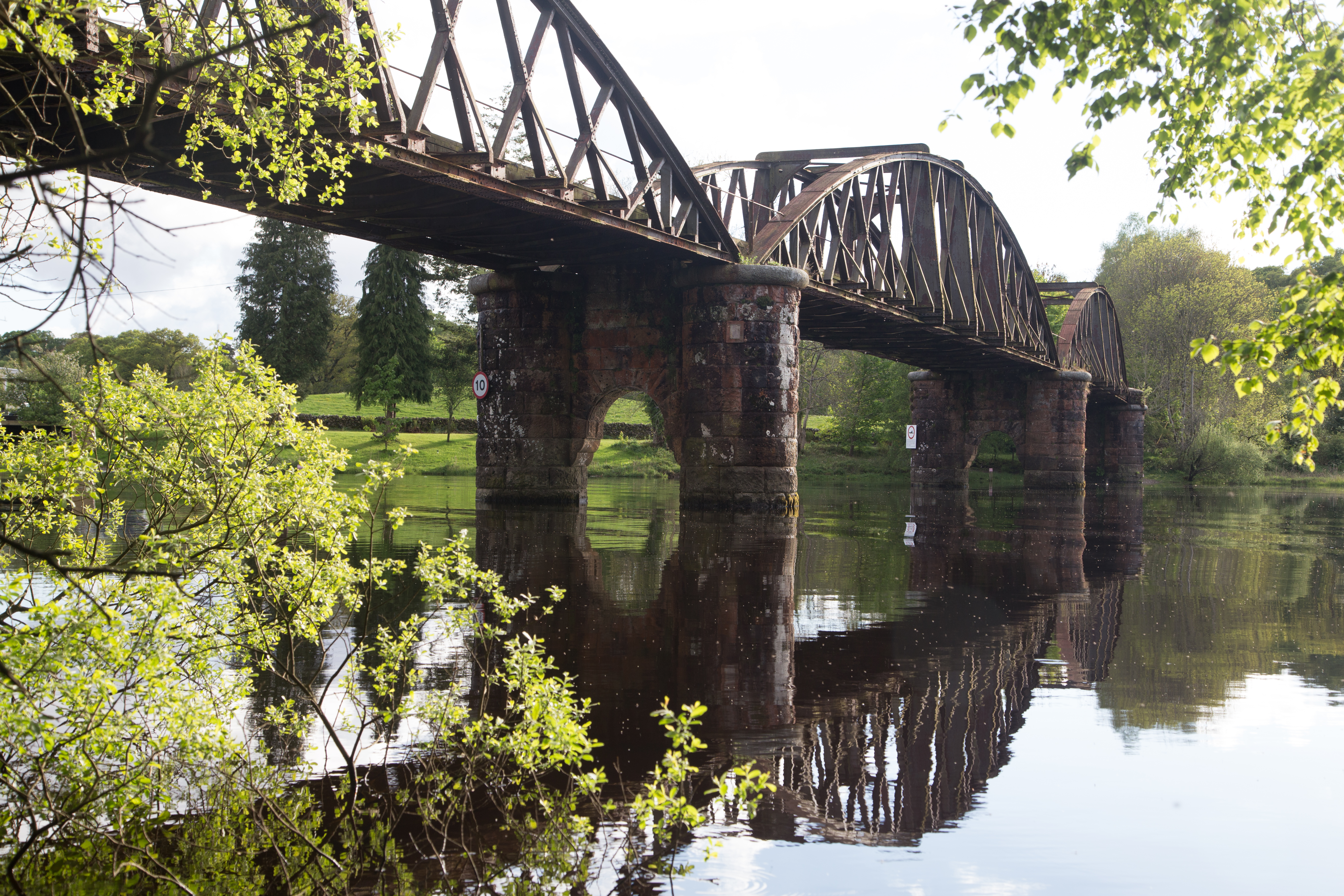
- Loch Ken Viaduct

Overview
- Other name: The Port Road
- Status: Disused
- Locale: Galloway, Scotland
- Termini: Castle Douglas; Stranraer

History
- Completed: 1862
- Closed: 1965

The Portpatrick and Wigtownshire Joint Railways (Note: The final word is in the plural.) were a network of railway lines serving sparsely populated areas of south-west Scotland. The title appeared in 1885 when the previously independent Portpatrick Railway (PPR) and Wigtownshire Railway (WR) companies were amalgamated by the Portpatrick and Wigtownshire Railways (Sale and Transfer) Act 1885 (48 & 49 Vict. c. clxxxiv) into a new company jointly owned by the Caledonian Railway, Glasgow & South Western Railway, Midland Railway and the London and North Western Railway and managed by a committee called the Portpatrick and Wigtownshire Joint Committee.

The Portpatrick Railway connected Castle Douglas and Portpatrick, opened in 1861 and 1862 and was intended to revive the transit to the north of Ireland through Portpatrick, although Stranraer actually became the dominant port. The line became known as The Port Road, as nobody ever called Portpatrick anything other than 'The Port.'

The Wigtownshire Railway, which ran from a connection with the PPR at Newton Stewart to Whithorn, opened from 1875.

The PPR route often known as the Port Road, linked Dumfries, via Castle Douglas, with the port towns of Portpatrick and Stranraer. It also formed part of a route by rail and sea from England and Scotland to the north of Ireland.

The line was single track throughout, serving a region of very low population density, but it achieved significance by carrying heavy traffic, both passenger and goods, to and from northern Irish destinations through Portpatrick and Stranraer. The line closed in 1965 apart from the short section from Stranraer Harbour to Challoch Junction, which continues in use as part of the Glasgow - Ayr - Stranraer route.

== History: beginnings ==
As early as 1620 Portpatrick had been established as the port for the short sea route between south-west Scotland and the north of Ireland, at Donaghadee in County Down. Irish cattle and horses were a dominant traffic early on, and Post Office mails developed later: by 1838 8,000 to 10,000 letters passed through the port daily, brought by road coach from Dumfries, and from Glasgow. A barracks was erected in the town to facilitate troop movements. However, the limitations of the little harbour became serious disadvantages as other more efficient rail-connected routes, via Liverpool, and later Holyhead became dominant. Portpatrick's nearest railhead was Ayr, 60 miles (97 km) away, and the Post Office discontinued use of Portpatrick for mails from 30 September 1849; much of the livestock traffic had already moved to other routes.

== The Castle Douglas and Dumfries Railway ==
The Glasgow and South Western Railway (G&SWR) was formed by amalgamation in 1850, on the opening of the main line which ran from Glasgow via Kilmarnock and Dumfries to Carlisle. When local interests promoted a railway branching from it at Dumfries and running to Castle Douglas, the G&SWR actively supported it, in fact subscribing £60,000 towards the little company's capital. The G&SWR motives appear to have been a desire to secure the territory from their rival, the Caledonian Railway, as well as the formation of a first section of a route to Portpatrick. The Castle Douglas and Dumfries Railway (CD&DR) opened on 7 November 1859 and was worked from the outset by the G&SWR.

The larger company soon made advances to take over the CD&DR, and did so (formally on the basis of an amalgamation) on 1 August 1865.

== Plans for a railway in Wigtownshire and Kirkcudbright ==
On 30 April 1856, before the CD&DR obtained its authorising act of Parliament, a meeting was held in Wigtown at which it was agreed that Wigtownshire and Kirkcudbrightshire (Note: Formally the Stewartry of Kirkcudbright.) needed a railway connection, and on 26 May 1856 it was decided to build a railway to Dumfries; the intention included connecting Portpatrick to the national railway network, with a view to reviving the Donaghadee route. The government indicated tentative support for such a sea connection, and for improving the harbour at Portpatrick, so the committee proceeded; on 19 September 1856 plans for the route of the British and Irish Grand Junction Railway were tabled. By now the CD&DR had obtained its authorising act of Parliament, the Castle Douglas and Dumfries Railway Act 1856 (19 & 20 Vict. c. cxiv), and the Portpatrick line would join it at Castle Douglas instead of going independently to Dumfries. The route east of Newton Stewart took a markedly northerly course through bleak terrain, and this may have been to avoid competing with coastal steamers on a more southerly alignment.

While there was much enthusiasm locally for the new venture, it was important to obtain financial support from investors elsewhere. For a while the Great Northern Railway (GNR) was leading, offering £160,000. At the time the GNR was no closer than Bradford, but it sought alliances and for a time had hopes of forming its own trunk route to Scotland and the north of Ireland. This was ended when the G&SWR made it clear it would refuse running powers between Gretna Junction and Castle Douglas.

== Portpatrick Railway ==
=== Formation and construction ===
Portpatrick Railway Act 1857
- Act of Parliament
- Parliament of the United Kingdom
- Long title: An Act to authorize the Construction of a Railway from Castle Douglas in the Stewartry of Kirkcudbright to Portpatrick in the County of Wigtown.
- Citation: 20 & 21 Vict. c. cxlix

Dates
- Royal assent: 17 August 1857

Text of statute as originally enacted

The British and Irish Grand Junction Railway Bill for the new line went to Parliament in the 1857 session, but the grand title was changed to the more modest Portpatrick Railway (PPR). With little opposition, it obtained the Portpatrick Railway Act 1857 (20 & 21 Vict. c. cxlix) on 17 August 1857. (Note: The Queen's Printer's copy incorrectly gives the date as 10 August 1857.) Capital was to be £460,000 with borrowing powers of £150,000, and three railways were required (Note: Smith says "required" on page 21, but on page 22 and page 28 it seems that this was negotiated.) to subscribe funds: the Lancaster and Carlisle Railway (£40,000), the G&SWR (£60,000), and the Belfast and County Down Railway (£15,000). (Those three railways had the option of subscribing more in addition.) The main line was to be 60 3/4 miles (98 km) in length from Castle Douglas to Portpatrick, with two short branches: to the west quay at Stranraer, and to the north pier at Portpatrick.

The construction process was put in hand, but the available funds were not sufficient to complete the line, and the PPR approached the other railways for further financial support; the Lancaster and Carlisle was reluctant but was urged by its sponsoring company, the London and North Western Railway to do so. The G&SWR subscribed an additional £40,000.

Towards the end of the construction period the PPR gave consideration to the working arrangements. The G&SWR were authorised to work the line by the original act of Parliament, and had offered to do so for 72% of gross receipts. This charge was considered excessive and negotiations took place which the PPR board considered unsatisfactory. On 28 March 1860, they decided that "the board should retain the working of the line under their own management" Evidently this had been foreseen, and provisional arrangements for the supply of locomotives had already been made, and this was quickly followed by contracts for rolling stock and for signalling equipment. The G&SWR had been confident that its terms for working the line would have to be accepted, and it was now angry at the emerging decision. It had subscribed £60,000 to the PPR on the assumption that the little company would effectively belong to it, and had promised a further £40,000: it now made that sum conditional on an impossible contribution by the Belfast and County Down Railway. The breach was irreconcilable, made more so by the fact that the acid correspondence between the two companies was published as a pamphlet. Dalrymple, as chairman, told his shareholders that the loss of the £40,000, though "attended with great inconvenience" need not "make any material, or at least, permanent, financial embarrassment".

=== Operation to 1863 ===
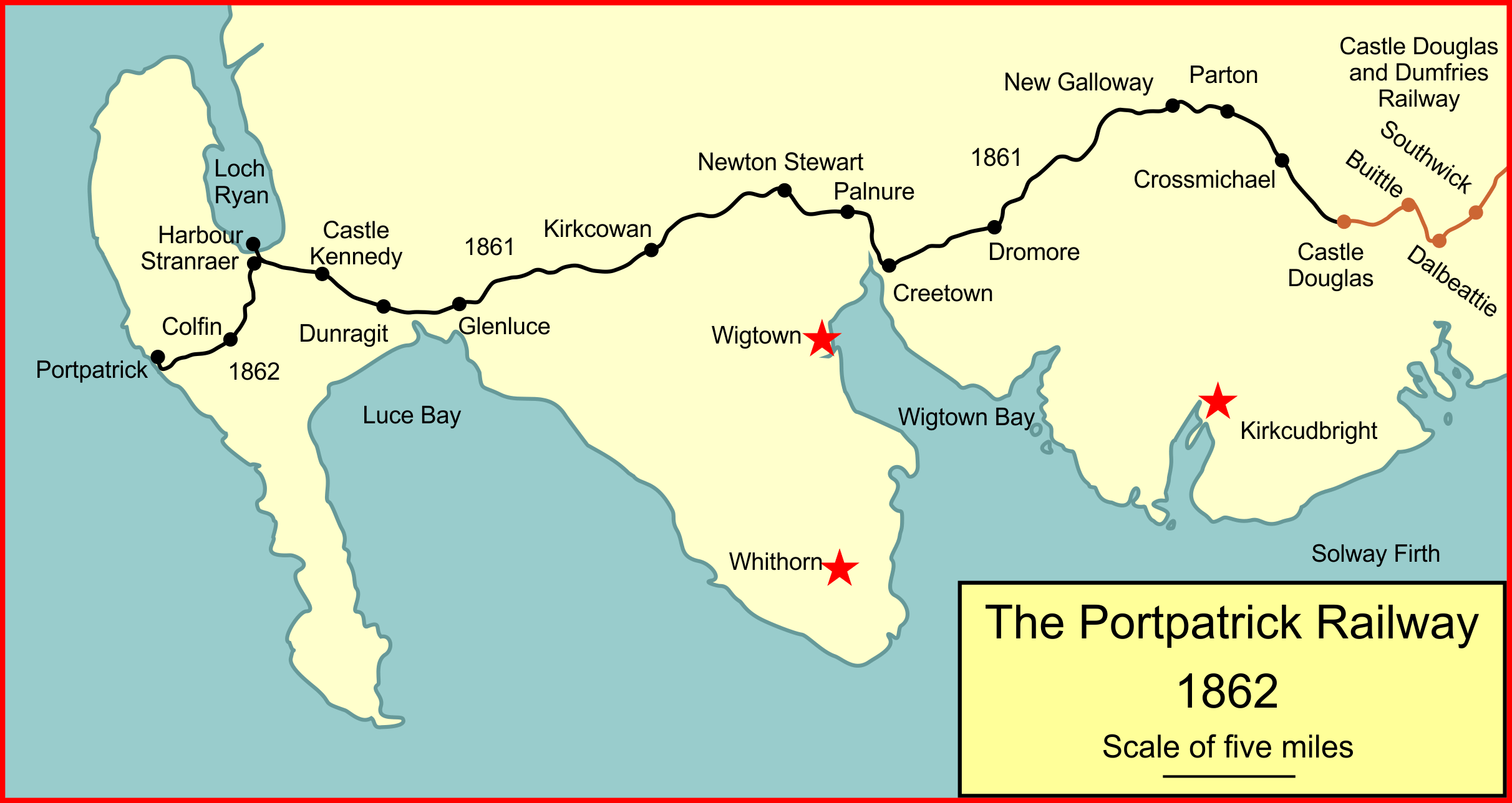
The Portpatrick Railway system, 1861–62

So the PPR made its own arrangements, and early in 1861 Captain H. W. Tyler made the formal inspection of the line over a three-day period. His only significant adverse comment was that the rail joints were not fished. (Note: Normally the butted ends of the rails are kept in alignment by fishplates.) The line was single throughout, worked by telegraph order; crossing stations were at Castle Douglas, New Galloway, Creetown, Newton Stewart, Glenluce and Stranraer. A shareholders' special train ran on 11 March 1861 and a full public service started the following day, consisting of two passenger trains each way between Stranraer and Castle Douglas, and probably one goods train. The line had not yet opened to Portpatrick itself. The passenger trains conveyed three classes of passenger. In November the passenger service was augmented to three trains each way, possibly by converting the goods train to mixed operation. At this time the motive power fleet consisted of three 0-4-2 mixed traffic tender locomotives and an 0-6-0 locomotive loaned by the LNWR.

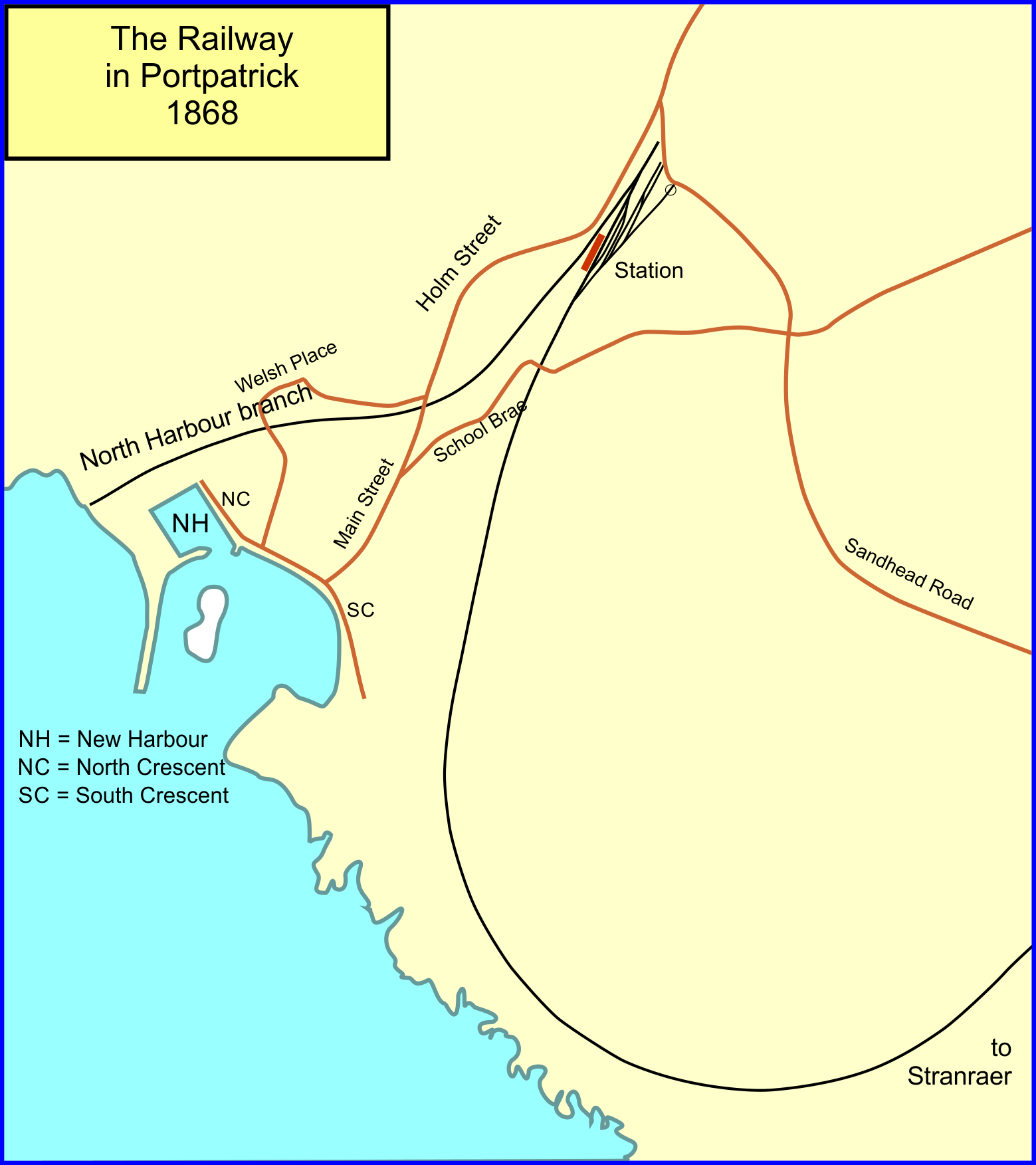
Railways within Portpatrick

In the Portpatrick Railway Act 1857 (20 & 21 Vict. c. cxlix), a clause had been entered penalising the company if the short branch to the north pier at Portpatrick was not completed by August 1862. The company had accepted this obligation on the understanding that the government would improve the little harbour to enable efficient working of mail and other shipping. This work was essential also to railway operation, as the available land for a terminal was very cramped. A change of government policy began to suggest that the harbour improvement works might not be funded, and the PPR, with limited funds for building its line, was alarmed that their obligation might be to build an unusable branch line; accordingly they had not built any of the main line from Stranraer. However, in 1861 the government did in fact put the work in hand, and the PPR now accelerated the completion of their lines, and the line opened on 28 August 1862, after a Board of Trade inspection on 1 August 1862. The line ran to a town terminus at Portpatrick. To reach the harbour itself, a headshunt was provided beyond the station; a backshunt from there led to the harbour; due to the cramped site the headshunt was only sufficient for an engine and two coaches. The ordinary Portpatrick station was informally referred to as "the high station"; the line to the harbour descended very steeply, and was a plain single line without sidings.

The harbour improvement works seemed to have been suspended and there was no sign of the transfer of the Post Office mail traffic—the original motivation for the entire PPR—to the route. There is no evidence of any passenger or goods terminal building on the harbour branch and it seems likely that the PPR was doing the minimum to comply with the legal obligation, having realised that the government-funded harbour improvements were now in doubt.

There were two daily trains in each direction between Stranraer and Portpatrick, one each way conveying goods also, but in October an express, not conveying 'parliamentary' (third class) passengers, was put on between Castle Douglas and Stranraer, making connection there with an Irish ferry. The burgh of Stranraer had constructed a "north landing place" and the PPR had built a deviation to the original Stranraer Pier branch to serve it. Although the sea passage from Stranraer to Irish destinations was longer than from Portpatrick, Stranraer was naturally sheltered and there was much more space for pier and railway accommodation. The Belfast and County Down Railway was extending its line to Larne on the north side of Belfast Lough and it appeared likely that a Stranraer - Larne ferry service would be more advantageous than a Portpatrick - Donaghadee one.

The "north landing place" became known as the East Pier and rail connection with it was established, boat trains to and from Castle Douglas (with connections for Carlisle) started on 1 October 1862. This was in advance of the Board of Trade inspection by Captain Tyler, on 2 December 1862, when he reported "that the opening of this branch would be attended with danger to the public using it by reason of the incompleteness of the works". The PPR continued to operate the short branch nonetheless. However, the ferry service was loss-making, and was discontinued (together with the boat trains) from 31 December 1863.

The PPR itself was losing money too; the 1862–1863 revenue account showed a loss of £1,073 on turnover of £9,464.

=== Locomotives 1861 to 1864 ===
Portpatrick Railway Locomotives 1861 to 1864
No	Name	Wheel Arrangement	Foundry	Built	Acquired	Notes
1		0-4-2	Sharp Stewart & Co	1861	1861	Caledonian Railway No 262
2		0-4-2	Sharp Stewart & Co	1861	1861	Caledonian Railway No 263
3		0-4-2	Sharp Stewart & Co	1861	1861	Caledonian Railway No 264
4		0-6-0	ex LNWR No 550, Crewe	1861	1861	Returned 1862 LNWR No 550
4		0-4-2	Sharp Stewart & Co	1862	1862	Caledonian Railway No 265
5		0-6-0	ex LNWR No 638, Crewe	1862	1862	Caledonian Railway No 266
6		2-2-2	Sharp Stewart & Co	1861	1861	Caledonian Railway No 267
7		2-2-2	Sharp Stewart & Co	1861	1861	Caledonian Railway No 268
8		2-4-0	Sharp Stewart & Co	1861	1861	Caledonian Railway No 269

== The Kirkcudbright Railway ==
The town of Kirkcudbright was some way from the growing railway network, and in 1861 local interests presented a bill to Parliament for a line from Castle Douglas; the Kirkcudbright Railway was authorised by the Kirkcudbright Railway Act 1861 (24 & 25 Vict. c. ccv) of 1 August 1861. It was to run from Castle Douglas to Kirkcudbright. It opened for goods traffic on 17 February 1864, and to passengers on 15 August 1864. It was absorbed by the G&SWR the following year, on 1 August 1865.

== Finding a sponsor for the Portpatrick Railway ==
The PPR was now (in 1863) in the position of having expended all its capital on building the line (and having been deprived of some promised funds from the G&SWR); losing money on revenue account; finding that the promised boom in mail traffic through Portpatrick was illusory; and observing that the Stranraer - Larne ferry was on the point of closing down. Moreover, the business of operating the railway directly had proven more complex and expensive than had been anticipated.

Portpatrick Railway (No. 1) Act 1864
- Act of Parliament
- Parliament of the United Kingdom
- Long title: An Act to enable the Portpatrick Railway Company to alter certain of their Works; to increase their Capital; to make working Arrangements with certain Companies; and to use Portions of other Undertakings.
- Citation: 27 & 28 Vict. c. cccxvii

Dates
- Royal assent: 29 July 1864

Text of statute as originally enacted

At this time the G&SWR approached the PPR, offering to subscribe the denied £40,000 after all. It did so on 15 December 1863. Its motivation for this change of heart was alarm that the Dumfries, Lochmaben and Lockerbie Railway had opened (on 1 September); that company was worked by the Caledonian Railway (CR), which therefore had access to Dumfries, and the PPR had asked the G&SWR for running powers over the CD&DR line, clearly intending to link with the CR. (The facility had been refused.) The G&SWR now hoped to acquire the PPR to fend off its rival. The PPR directors were aggrieved at the bad faith of the G&SWR over the £40,000 subscription, and negotiated with the CR, who offered generous terms including the subscription of £40,000, matching the G&SWR offer. Provisional agreement to the working arrangement with the CR was finalised, and a parliamentary bill was prepared by the PPR, seeking running powers over the CD&DR line (and the short section of G&SWR at Dumfries); the bill also sought to regularise the Stranraer East Pier, and to substantially increase authorised share capital. The bill was passed by Parliament and became the Portpatrick Railway (No. 1) Act 1864 (27 & 28 Vict. c. cccxvii) on 29 July 1864. The running powers had been secured. The working arrangement with the CR took effect on 4 December 1864. (Note: Date implied, but not stated, by Smith.)

== Worked by the Caledonian ==
The Caledonian Railway lost no time in imposing its presence; through traffic to Glasgow and Edinburgh was routed via Lockerbie and the CR. The CR was responsible for maintaining the PPR line, but soon requested additional facilities, such as siding accommodation at Stranraer and additional crossing places. The actual intermediate passing places were New Galloway, Dromore, Creetown, Newton Stewart and Glenluce. The CR wanted to add Crossmichael, Loch Skerrow, Kirkcowan and Dunragit. The PPR had imagined that signing the Working Agreement would release it from expenses like this, and in any case, hardly had any money to extend its facilities.

In this period the line was operated by train despatcher (rather than by a train staff system) until the late 1880s.

Smith describes an incident illustrating the primitive state of Portpatrick Railway resources:

Portpatrick was a brute of a place to get out of—a great grinding curve, and an up-grade of 1 in 57, the whole in full track of the westerly gales, even in the rock cutting where the blow hole up at the Tailor's Peak let the salt spray in to coat the rails. The old single [probably 2-2-2 no. 7] was coming up, and, not unusually, stuck. "Get back an' half yer train" instructed the driver. "H'ye a saaa?" inquired the fireman. Truly a saw would have been necessary, for they had only one coach on!"

== The Girvan and Portpatrick Junction Railway ==
The Portpatrick Railway gave ready access from Portpatrick and Stranraer to Dumfries and English locations, but the connection from the City of Glasgow was ill-served. On 5 July 1865 an act of Parliament, the Girvan and Portpatrick Junction Railway Act 1865 (28 & 29 Vict. c. ccclviii), authorising the Girvan and Portpatrick Junction Railway (G&PJR) received royal assent; it would join with existing routes via Ayr, and connect in to the PPR at Challoch Junction, about 6 1/2 miles (10 km) east of Stranraer. At first, this was treated amicably by the PPR as it would shoulder a share of the costs of the port facilities at Stranraer and bring in mileage fees for the through running, but when the G&PJR agreed with the G&SWR to work its line, the Caledonian Railway, working the PPR line, became defensive. The G&PJR started public operation on 5 October 1877 in the face of CR obstruction.

Heavy expenditure on enhanced signalling and other works were incurred by the PPR, to be paid for by the G&PJR. However that company was in deep financial difficulties, even more so than the PPR, and the matter went to the Court of Session. Notice of Interdict was served on 1 February 1882 and from 7 February G&PJR trains were not allowed to run over the PPR. The G&PJR terminated both passenger and goods trains at New Luce and the gap was covered by road transport.

The G&PJR managed to raise some money and cleared most of the indebtedness, and through train running resumed from 1 August 1883.

== Shipping services ==
Portpatrick Railway (Steamboats) Act 1864
- Act of Parliament
- Parliament of the United Kingdom
- Long title: An Act to enable the Portpatrick Railway Company to establish Communication by Steam Vessels between Portpatrick and Donaghadee, and between Stranraer and Belfast and Larne.
- Citation: 27 & 28 Vict. c. cccxviii

Dates
- Royal assent: 29 July 1864

Text of statute as originally enacted

Convinced that Irish traffic would be profitable, the CR acquired two small paddle steamers and operated a service between Stranraer and Belfast from 4 December 1865. The PPR was prevailed upon to support this venture financially; but Irish traffic suffered a severe decline at this time and when one of the steamers suffered damage during a crossing on 21 January 1868, the decision was taken to suspend the ferry operation. Once again the purpose of the PPR—to connect with Ireland—was frustrated. An independent company, the Donaghadee and Portpatrick Steam Packet Company now started a service, with a single vessel making at first two-round trips daily from 13 July 1868, cut back to one daily round trip from 21 September, but then discontinued from 31 October 1868. It appears likely that connecting trains used the ordinary Portpatrick station, not the Harbour terminal.

During this period the Government's intentions regarding the use of Portpatrick as a mail terminal clarified: there was now no prospect of this happening, and when the government offered compensation of £20,000 and the transfer of ownership of the harbour at Portpatrick to the PPR, these terms were accepted as the best that could be obtained. The Caledonian Railway proposed that this be regarded as income of the line, to which they would be entitled. As they had accepted the commercial risk of revenue income which was now lacking, this might seem reasonable; but the PPR successfully argued that this was not provided for in the Working Agreement, and they refused to share the money.

From 18 August 1871 another independent operator started a service between Donaghadee and Portpatrick. On 29 August the vessel, named Aber, was rammed in thick fog by an Atlantic steamer and sank in five minutes; the new service had lasted 12 days.

As a visible indication of the decline of the port, the Portpatrick lighthouse was dismantled in 1871 and shipped to, and erected in Colombo in Ceylon (now Sri Lanka).

A final attempt at a regular service started on 7 June 1873, but there was little patronage and it ceased five days later, on 12 July 1873. £500,000 had been expended on the harbour. In October 1874 the rails were lifted and moved to Newton Stewart to be used in the extension of siding accommodation there.

If the Post Office was unwilling to support Portpatrick, they were not opposed to taking advantage of a route that did not need massive capital expenditure, and from March 1871 they agreed to pay £1,500 annually for the carriage of mail over the PPR, on the basis of trains running in direct connection with night mail trains on the main line. This encouraged the PPR to support a Larne and Stranraer Steamboat Company in running a daily return crossing on that route, from 1 July 1872; the vessel was the Princess Louise. This improved the finances of the PPR considerably, and the company agreed to the use of a small shunting engine to take passenger coaches on to the East Pier at Stranraer; the flimsy structure had not previously been used and passengers had to walk along the unsheltered jetty to the ships.

Late in 1875 a second, similar, steamer was commissioned, named Princess Beatrice.

Portpatrick Railway Act 1877
- Act of Parliament
- Parliament of the United Kingdom
- Long title: An Act to authorise the Portpatrick Railway Company to acquire the East Pier at the Harbour of Stranraer; and for other purposes.
- Citation: 40 & 41 Vict. c. lx

Dates
- Royal assent: 28 June 1877

Text of statute as originally enacted

The East Pier at Stranraer was owned and maintained by the town council. It had never been robust, and subsidence and other difficulties demanded urgent repairs in May 1876. The council was unwilling to execute the work, costed at £6,000, and after considerable wrangling, the PPR obtained authorisation to take over the pier, by the Portpatrick Railway Act 1877 (40 & 41 Vict. c. lx) of 28 June 1877.

== Wigtownshire Railway ==
=== First construction ===
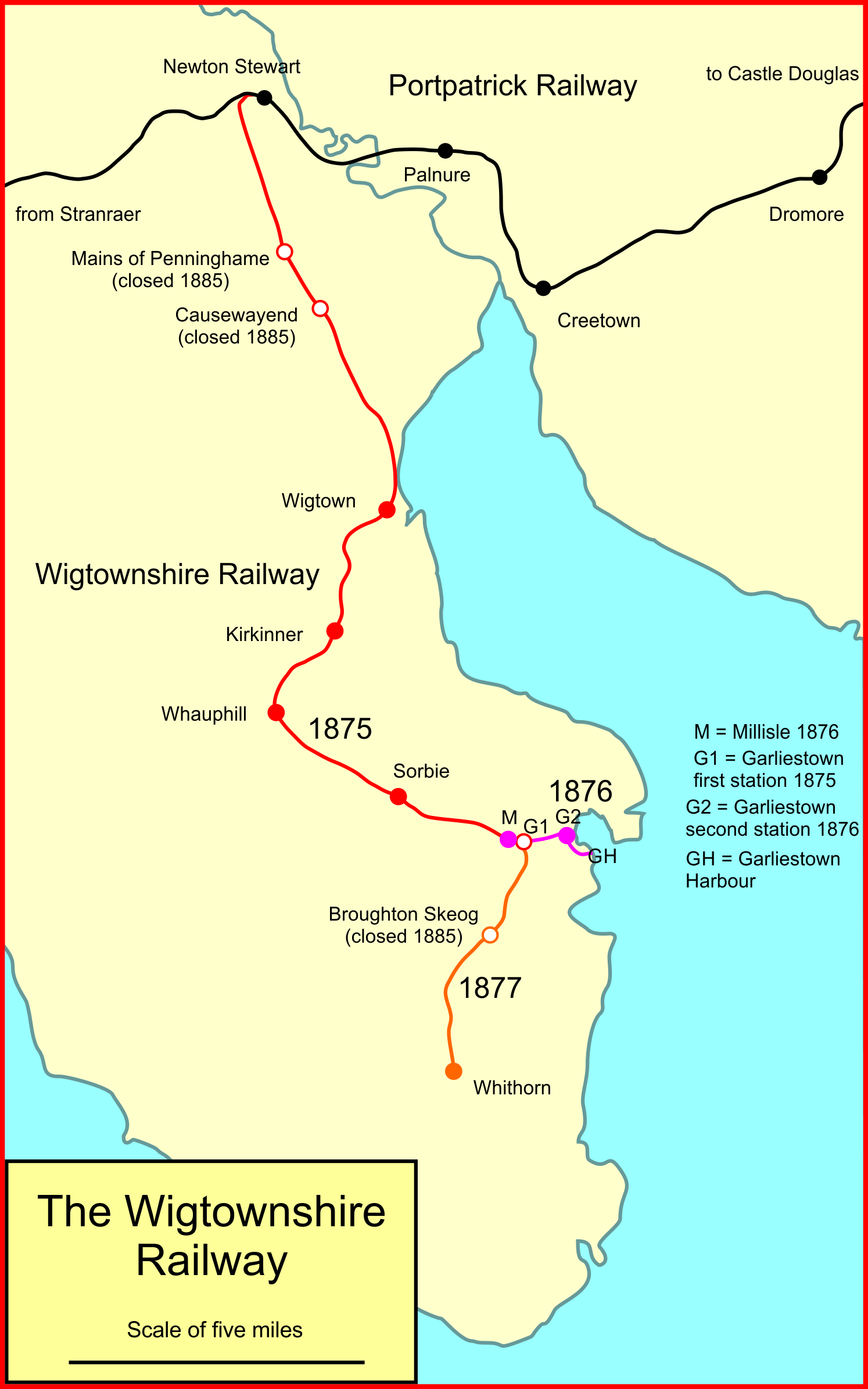
System map of the Wigtownshire Railway

The area of Galloway known as the Machars lies south of Newton Stewart between Luce Bay and Wigtown Bay. The agricultural land is the most productive in the area and the several ports served coastal and international shipping. Proposals were made in 1863 for a railway to be built in the area, but it was not until 1871 that sufficient interest in a railway scheme was generated. The proposed line was from Newton Stewart on the PPR southwards to Wigtown and nearly to Garliestown, (Note: This was the spelling at the time; the Ordnance Survey maps use that spelling up to the 1947 edition; the seventh series one-inch map surveyed in 1951 is the first to use Garlieston. (Ordnance Survey of Great Britain: One inch to one mile, seventh series, published by the Ordnance Survey, Southampton.) However Quick states that the goods station was called Garlieston by 1910.) then turning away to Whithorn. The divergence was due to the hostility of the 9th Earl of Galloway who owned extensive lands in the area. The harbour of Garliestown was to be reached by a short horse-operated tramway branch, running partly along the road.

Wigtownshire Railway Act 1872
- Act of Parliament
- Parliament of the United Kingdom
- Long title: An Act for making a Railway from Newton Stewart to Whithorn and a Tramway to Garlies Town, in the county of Wigtown; and for other purposes.
- Citation: 35 & 36 Vict. c. lxxxviii

Dates
- Royal assent: 18 July 1872

The Wigtownshire Railway (WR) was authorised by an act of Parliament, the Wigtownshire Railway Act 1872 (35 & 36 Vict. c. lxxxviii), of 18 July 1872, with capital of £96,000 and the usual one-third borrowing powers, only to be accessible if a certain proportion of shares had been subscribed. The 1 1/2-mile (2.4 km) tramway could not be operated by locomotives, nor by stationary engine or as an "atmospheric railway". The main line was to be just over 19 miles (31 km) long.

Construction proceeded, although share subscription was not as full as hoped, and the Company started to consider working arrangements. The obvious sponsor was the Caledonian Railway, but the CR had lost money working the PPR and declined. The WR decided to work the line itself, and were pleasantly surprised to receive a letter dated 7 January 1875 from Thomas Wheatley, who had (it transpired) recently resigned under a cloud from the North British Railway, where he had been locomotive superintendent. Wheatley offered to do everything necessary to work and maintain the line for 65% of gross receipts. This seemed too good to be true but, taking Wheatley's misdemeanour into account, everything seemed in order, and Wheatley was given the working contract for five years from 31 July 1875.

The section from Newton Stewart to Wigtown was ready for goods operation on 1 March 1875 and locomotive no. 1, a 2-2-2 well tank obtained by Wheatley from the NBR (their no. 32) arrived to take up its duties. Goods traffic started on 3 March 1875 and a passenger service to Wigtown was begun on 7 April 1875 with some four-wheel coaches, thought to be second-hand from the LNWR. There were four journeys each way daily. There were no intermediate stations until May when platforms at Causewayend and Mains of Penninghame were ordered to be installed. There was not a frequent service here: the 10.20 am and 4.20 pm trains called on Fridays only, Newton Stewart market day.

At this time the planned construction of the line was to extend to Sorbie, as the available share subscriptions would only reach that far. However, Sorbie was a poor location for a terminal, and thoughts turned to reaching Garliestown, another 2 miles (3 km) further. Certain directors agreed to subscribe further funds, amounting to £7,000 and the work was quickly put in hand. The line was opened throughout from Newton Stewart to a Garliestown station on 2 August 1875. Wheatley procured a second engine, no. 2, an 0-4-2 pannier tank, formerly an 0-4-2 tender engine, no. 146 of the NBR.

The station called Garliestown was at the point of junction of the projected Whithorn line, but it was some distance from Garliestown itself. It was now decided to build a railway extension to Garliestown, and this was laid out on the north side of the road, whereas the authorised tramway would have been in the road. This line was not authorised by Parliament, and it was paid for by separate subscriptions by the directors. It opened on 3 April 1876, and four trains daily ran from Newton Stewart to the new Garliestown station; the earlier one was renamed Millisle and downgraded to goods service only. The track layout there involved a backshunt to reach Garliestown.

The line between Garliestown and Wigtown may have closed to passengers briefly in August 1876.

Wheatley now obtained two more locomotives: no. 3 was an 0-4-2 tender engine, Addison from the Fleetwood, Preston and West Riding Junction Railway, and Gardner, an 0-4-0 tender engine converted from an 0-4-2 saddle tank from the same line became no. 4.

=== Completion of the line ===
Wigtownshire Railway Act 1877
- Act of Parliament
- Parliament of the United Kingdom
- Long title: An Act to authorise the construction by the Wigtownshire Railway Company of a Branch Railway to the Harbour of Garliestown, and the abandonment of their authorised Tramway to the said Harbour; and for other purposes.
- Citation: 40 & 41 Vict. c. li

Dates
- Royal assent: 28 June 1877

Text of statute as originally enacted

So Wigtown and Garliestown had been reached, the latter by an unauthorised railway branch; but Whithorn interests had subscribed money to the railway, and it was still 4 miles (6 km) from their town. Energetic canvassing for share subscription proved to be successful, and enough money came in to let a contract to complete the line. Fresh parliamentary authority was obtained in the Wigtownshire Railway Act 1877 (40 & 41 Vict. c. li) to extend the share capital and to legalise the Garliestown branch.

The Whithorn extension was ready for a ceremonial opening on 7 July 1877 and it was opened to the public on 9 July; a fifth engine, another 2-2-2 well tank, was obtained by Wheatley; formerly no. 31A of the NBR, it became WR no. 5. The Garliestown section was now operated as a shuttle branch line from a new Millisle station, 7 chains (140 m) north of the original Garliestown station. In December 1877 a platform was provided at Broughton Skeog level crossing. There were four passenger (or mixed) trains each way daily on the Whithorn main line, and seven shuttle services on the Garliestown branch. As well as passengers, cattle were a dominant traffic from the agricultural activity in the area, and imports from the harbours also. Excursion steamers ran from Garliestown to the Isle of Man, and excursion trains ran in connection from Stranraer and Dumfries.

Wheatley's operating contract expired on 31 July 1880 and in the absence of offers from the CR and G&SWR, the WR board negotiated a renewal with Wheatley, on slightly less favourable (to him) terms. Wheatley now brought another engine, no. 6, into the fleet he operated: an 0-6-0 saddle tank Bradby that he had been using elsewhere on contract work. At about this time, the 2-2-2 no. 1 was rebuilt as a 2-4-0. The 0-4-0 no. 4 seems to have been unsatisfactory and after a period laid up, was converted to an 0-4-2 saddle tank; after the conversion this locomotive proved much more useful.

On 13 March 1883 Wheatley died suddenly. His son, W. T. Wheatley had for several years been assisting him on the line, and took over the working contract until the end of the Wigtownshire Railway's independent existence. The Portpatrick and Wigtownshire Joint Railways were vested on 1 August 1885 and the independent existence of the Wigtownshire Railway took effect on 31 December 1885. The Wheatleys had served the little Company well in operating the line with the barest of financial resources.

David L. Smith gives two references to the use of tender-cab locomotives on the Whithorn line, at unspecified dates. In Tales of the Glasgow and South Western Railway (photograph before page 41) he reproduces a photograph of an 0-4-2; the caption reads "No. 17029, at one period no. 114. Fitted with tender cab for working Whithorn branch. In Legends he refers to "that old Millisle stalwart, No. 17440, with the tender cab".

== Formation of the Portpatrick and Wigtownshire Joint Railways ==
From 1873 the Midland Railway (MR) was nearing completion of its line to Carlisle—the Settle and Carlisle line—and it needed a Scottish partner: the G&SWR. The Midland was thinking strategically, wishing to recoup the expense of its long new trunk line, and it energised the G&SWR to do the same. The two companies formed a powerful Anglo-Scottish alliance. The rival Caledonian Railway (CR) was working the Portpatrick Railway line, and the Portpatrick Railway itself had become much more profitable in later years, paying a peak dividend of 4.75%. The CR working contract was due to expire in 1885 and the MR and G&SWR began to consider the implications. The CR and its English partner, the London and North Western Railway (LNWR) naturally wished to retain control, and the power struggle reached a stalemate. The outcome was that all four parties offered to acquire the railway jointly, guaranteeing Portpatrick Railway shareholders 3.5% on their holdings. This was an attractive offer, and after some negotiation on matters of detail, the arrangement was agreed upon, with the addition that the Wigtownshire Railway was to be included.

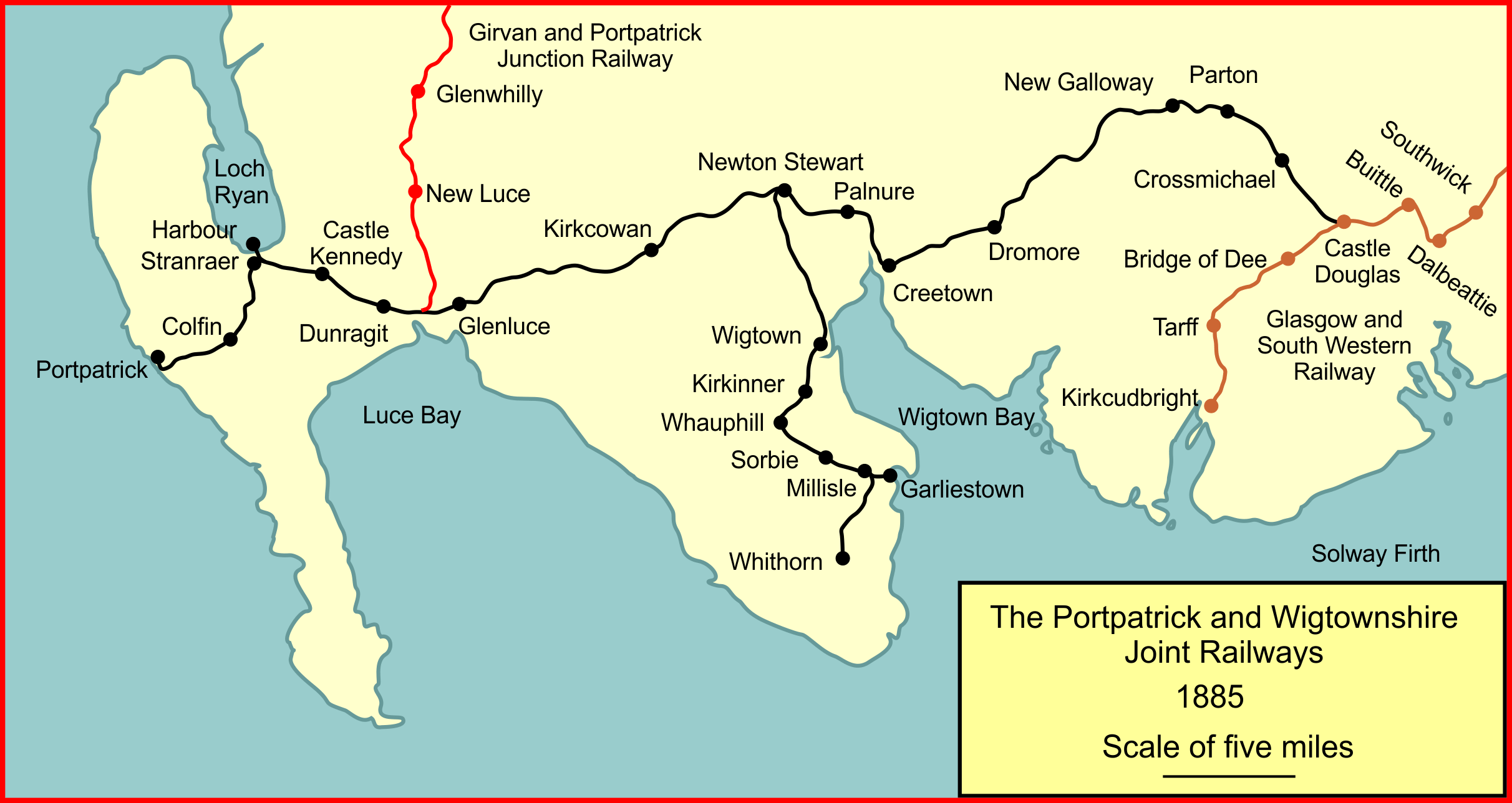
The P&WJ Railways system in 1885

Portpatrick and Wigtownshire Railways (Sale and Transfer) Act 1885
- Act of Parliament
- Parliament of the United Kingdom
- Long title: An Act to authorise the Sale and Transfer of the Portpatrick Railway and the Wigtownshire Railway to the London and North-western, the Midland, the Caledonian, and the Glasgow and South-western Railway Companies jointly; and for other purposes.
- Citation: 48 & 49 Vict. c. clxxxiv

Dates
- Royal assent: 6 August 1885

A parliamentary bill was presented, proposing a vesting date of 1 August 1885. The Portpatrick and Wigtownshire Railways (Sale and Transfer) Act 1885 (48 & 49 Vict. c. clxxxiv) was actually passed on 6 August 1885. 3.5% guaranteed stock was issued, one for one to Portpatrick Railway shareholders, and one for two to Wigtownshire Railway shareholders. The sale value was £491,980, which included £10,000 of stock in the Larne and Stranraer Steamboat Company. The four owning railways: LNWR, MR, CR and G&SWR were to form a joint committee to manage the line, and the Portpatrick Railway Company and the Wigtownshire Railway Company were to be dissolved on 1 January 1886. The LNWR was granted running powers over the G&SWR between Dumfries and Castle Douglas, and the MR acquired running powers between Carlisle and Gretna Junction. The "Stranraer Section" Joint Committee would continue to administer the section between Challoch Junction and Stranraer, accessed by trains from the Girvan line, although these were worked entirely by the G&SWR.

The two Scottish companies were to share the operational control between them, although Joint Committee meetings seem to have taken place in London. Wheatley's rolling stock fleet was purchased at valuation (£6,400).

== P&WJR operation ==
Domestic operation did not change much at first; but the London trains ran from Dumfries to Carlisle via Annan rather than via Lockerbie, with a significant time saving. The MR put on a six-wheel Pullman sleeping car.

The G&SWR now got a share of the working; their train crews had no familiarity with the route at first, and the Caledonian Railway refused to provide conductors. Smith recounts an early trip:

Shankland and McGill were coming from Dumfries to Stranraer with the evening train. It was dark when they left Creetown—an' Jock says t'me, "Well, that's Newton Stewart noo". But as they descended the long bank, doubts assailed McGill. "Canny on, man, Jock" says I. Is there no a station aboot here?" "Whitna station?" says he. "Dod," says I, "I think they ca' it Palnyowr or something". So we stoppit, an gor, we were half a mile by it! So we backit up. There were nae signals, only a caun'le in the winda. Naebody gaed oot or got in, so we just gaed on tae Newton Stewart again."

It emerged that the Wigtownshire line was in a very run-down state and engine power was frequently inadequate. The permanent way needed to be completely renewed (except on the Garliestown branch) in 1886.

Signalling was upgraded on the Portpatrick line in 1886–87, with electric train tablet instruments, and this was extended to the Challoch Junction to Stranraer section in 1887–88.

In the 1895 public passenger timetable, the former Portpatrick Railway main line had four trains each way daily; the first down and last up were fast trains, with "Sleeping Saloon between Euston and Stranraer Harbour". The other trains ran only to or from Stranraer (Town), three each way continuing to Portpatrick. There was an additional short working from Newton Stewart to Stranraer (Town) and back. The Whithorn line had four trains each way, most of them having a connection both to and from Garliestown.

At this time there were eight short workings each way between Stranraer and Dunragit, calling at Castle Kennedy. There were four G&SWR workings to and from Stranraer over the Challoch to Stranraer section.

== The Portpatrick Railway in the twentieth century ==
In the first years of the century, the Manson tablet exchange apparatus (referred to as Manson's travelling tablet catcher) was installed on the line, enabling exchange of the single-line tablets at signal boxes at a higher speed than with manual exchange. Acceleration of the fast trains was planned, and the Traffic Manager, Hutchinson, asked of the Engineer, Melville, "I assume that there can be no objection to the inclusive speed of one of our trains being increased from 36 to 40 mph. The road, I take it, is as good as can be found anywhere." Melville replied "There can be no objection at all to the express trains running at the inclusive speed you refer to ..." The acceleration was applied from July 1901.

At this period loadings on the express trains was increasing, leading to operating difficulties, and from March 1904 it was indicated that the mail train would run in duplicate.

Regular passenger services ceased on the Garliestown branch on 1 March 1903; Millisle was then renamed Millisle for Garlieston and trains reverted to calling at the original Garliestown station. The railway continued to provide excursion trains to Garliestown in connection with steamer excursions until 1935.

In 1922 there was a bad derailment near Palnure. When the state of the permanent way was assessed, "the Ministry of Transport was a bit shocked ... so the entire PP&W main line was put under a 45 mph [72 km/h] restriction till it could be reballasted and relaid. This was carried out in the next two years."

In the 1921 grouping the line became part of the London, Midland and Scottish Railway (LMS).

As locomotive designs developed, the difficult route of the Portpatrick and Wigtownshire line was unable to take advantage of large locomotive traction. Smith records that "At the end of March 1939 there came momentous news—official sanction for a 60 ft [18 m]; 4-6-0s to work to Stranraer". On 23 March 1939, a trial run was made with a 4-6-0, with the locomotive and tender separated at Stranraer to turn them. "There was no prospect of the 60 ft turntable being ready before late summer, so they laid longer rails, projecting at each end, on the existing 50 ft [15 m] turntable. This allowed them to turn a Class 5 4-6-0. The class 5s began to work from Glasgow to Stranraer on 16 April 1939.

It was about October that the new 60-foot turntable was ready at Stranraer. Class 5X 4-6-0s were drafted in, and were the mainstay of the Stranraer road throughout the war. World War II brought exceptional amounts of traffic to the line.

Smith records that 36 troop trains traversed the line in April 1940 as British forces were built up in Northern Ireland against the possibility of an enemy invasion of the Republic of Ireland. By the end of the year,

Large numbers of troops were now stationed in Northern Ireland, and the ordinary passenger [train] service proved quite inadequate for men going on leave to England and Wales. A special sailing had to be provided, with two large trains in connection. A train from London and one from Cardiff worked into Stranraer in the early morning, returning in the evening about 6.30 p.m. These were made up eventually to 16 coaches, each with a buffet car. Siding accommodation at Stranraer was terribly inadequate. They could service only one of those huge trains, so the Cardiff train had to be hauled to Ayr and back each day for servicing. Two Caley [Caledonian Railway] Class 3F 0-6-0s were put on this job.

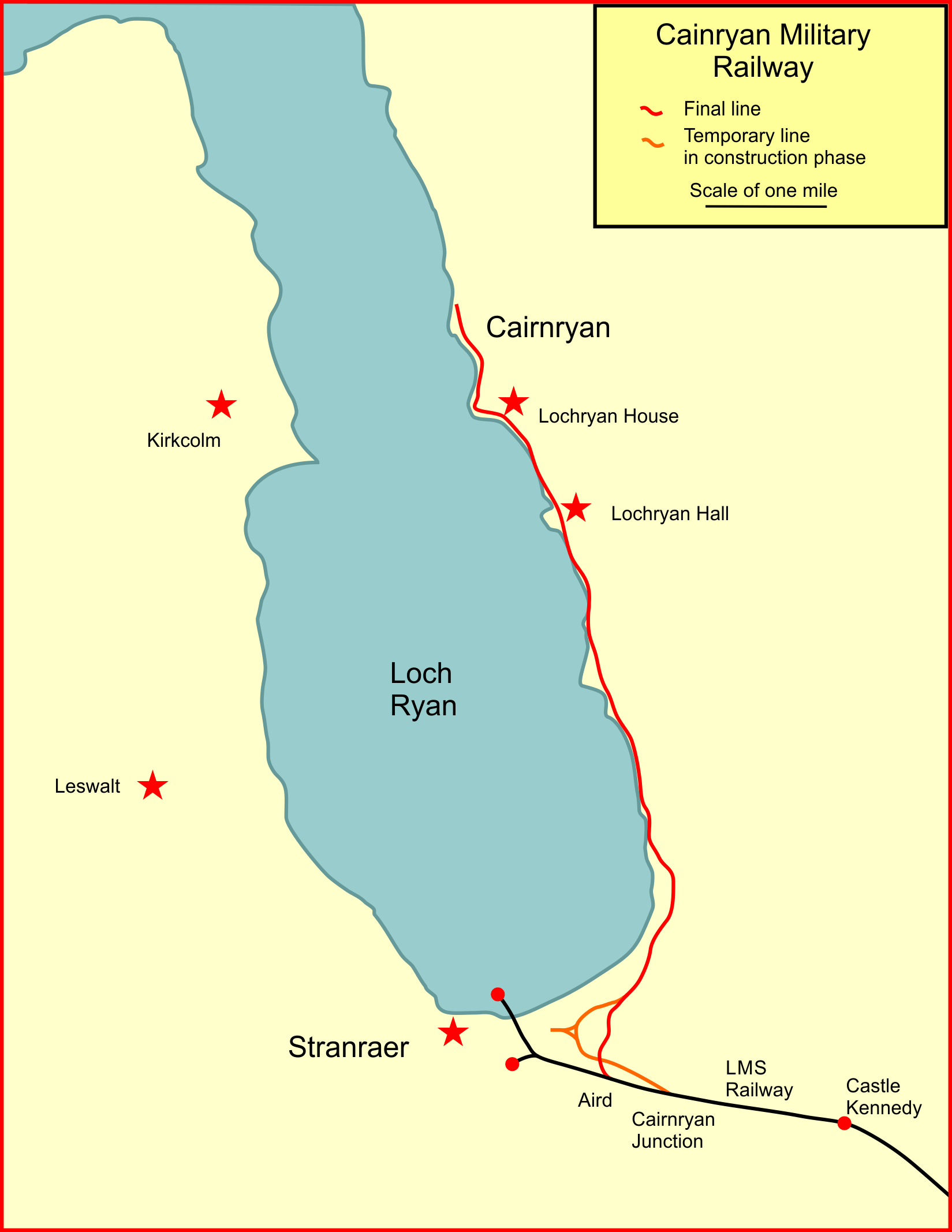
Cairnryan Military Railway system

Later in the war it was decided that an emergency west coast port should be established, to continue transatlantic trade in the event that Glasgow or Liverpool docks were disabled by enemy action. A new harbour facility was developed on Loch Ryan, called Cairnryan Harbour, and it was served by the Cairnryan Military Railway. This was a considerable undertaking. The new railway joined the Stranraer to Challoch line at Cairnryan Junction, about 2 miles (3 km) east of Stranraer, facing for trains approaching from the east. The point of junction was later moved closer to Stranraer, at Aird.

The line opened in July 1942. In the event the port was not needed, and only eighteen fully laden ocean-going vessels used the port during its lifetime. The port was closed after the war and the railway's last movement was a dismantling train in 1967. Smith speculates that if the port had been needed at full capacity, the limited rail access over difficult single lines (from Dumfries and from Ayr) would have been challenging.

Goods services ran from Newton Stewart to Whithorn until the line closed on 5 October 1964. By the 1960s, these services ran three days per week; with conditional working on the Garlieston branch, when required.

The section from Colfin to Portpatrick also closed in 1950; although Colfin to Stranraer remained open until 1959 for milk traffic. After that trains ran only to the northwestern termini: Stranraer Town and Stranraer Harbour.

The former Wigtownshire Railway closed completely to passengers on 29 September 1950; and the Portpatrick to Stranraer Town section closed in stages in the 1950s.

The main line closed on 12 June 1965 in consequence of the Beeching review.

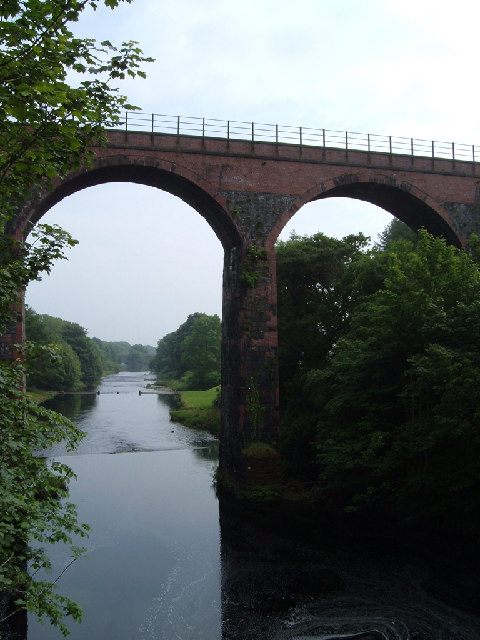
Glenluce Viaduct

Major structures on the route include the Loch Ken viaduct, across the Dee, the Gatehouse viaduct across the Big Water of Fleet, and the Glenluce viaduct, over the Water of Luce.

== Topography ==
The Portpatrick Railway opened between Castle Douglas and Stranraer (later Town station) on 12 March 1861; from Stranraer to Portpatrick on 28 August 1862; and the East Pier branch at Stranraer (later Stranraer Harbour) on 1 October 1862. The Portpatrick Harbour section opened on 11 September 1868; it is likely that passenger use ceased in November 1868, but the short line remained open until 1870. However Portpatrick railway station, which opened on 28 August 1862, remained open until 6 February 1950.

The line closed from Castle Douglas to Challoch Junction on 14 June 1965. The Challoch Junction to Stranraer (Harbour) section remains in use for trains from Ayr via Girvan.

In Kirkcudbrightshire:

- (Castle Douglas; CD&DR station; also junction for the Kirkcudbright Railway;)
- Crossmichael;
- Parton;
- New Galloway
- Loch Skerrow; opened after June 1861; renamed Lochskerrow 13 June 1955;
- Gatehouse of Fleet; opened as Dromore September 1861; renamed Gatehouse 1 July 1863; renamed Dromore for Gatehouse 1 June 1865; renamed Gatehouse 1 September 1866; renamed Dromore 1 June 1871; renamed Gatehouse of Fleet 1 January 1912; closed 5 December 1949; reopened 20 May 1950;
- Creetown;
- Palnure; opened 1 July 1861; closed 7 May 1951;

and in Wigtownshire:

- Newton Stewart; junction station for Whithorn;
- Kirkcowan;
- Glenluce;
- Dunragit;
- Castle Kennedy; opened 1 July 1861;
- Stranraer Harbour; originally "East Pier"; remaining open and reverted to "Stranraer" in 1993;
- Stranraer; renamed Stranraer Town 2 March 1953; closed to passengers 7 March 1966, and completely in 1994;
- Colfin; closed 6 February 1950;
- Portpatrick; closed 6 February 1950;
- Portpatrick Harbour; passenger use started 11 September 1868; and ceased November 1868; the line remained available for goods movements until 1870.

The Wigtownshire Railway opened as far as Wigtown to goods traffic on 3 March 1875 and to passengers on 7 April 1875; it was extended to the first "Garliestown" station on 2 August 1875, and again to the second Garliestown on 3 April 1876. The extension to Whithorn opened on 9 July 1877. The entire line closed on 25 September 1950.

Locations on the Wigtownshire Railway main line were:

- (Newton Stewart: Portpatrick Railway station)
- Mains of Penninghame; opened May 1875; closed 6 August 1885;
- Causewayend; opened May 1875; closed 6 August 1885;
- Wigtown;
- Kirkinner
- Whauphill; opened 2 August 1875;
- Sorbie; opened 2 August 1875;
- Millisle; opened 3 April 1876; (Note: As a passenger station according to Butt; but Smith says goods only. Thorne says that in February 1877 the Board dictated that "the original Garliestown station at the junction be called Millisle" but this probably refers to this new station. Thorne also says that the term Millisle Junction occurs in July 1977.) moved a short distance south and renamed Millisle for Garliestown 1 March 1903;
- Garliestown (first station); opened 2 August 1875; also known as Garliestown Upper from February 1876, and Garliestown Junction "later in 1876"; closed 3 April 1876;
- Broughton Skeog; opened December 1877; closed 6 August 1885;
- Whithorn;

and on the Garliestown branch:

- Garliestown (second station); opened 3 April 1876; closed 1 March 1903; also known as Garliestown New from February 1876, and later that year Garliestown Village.

A remarkable engineering structure on the line is the Big Water of Fleet Viaduct, about 1 mile (1.6 km) northeast of the former Dromore station. It was the largest structure on the Portpatrick Railway, being a stone viaduct of twenty spans. In the early years of the twentieth century, it was in danger of failing and extensive repair work was carried out from 1926, including sheathing the piers in heavy brickwork and spandrel strengthening using old rails; the repairs considerably degraded its aesthetic appearance. It is class B listed. Its nearby sister ‘Little Water of Fleet viaduct’ was demolished for an RAF exercise ordered by Winston Churchill in 1946.

On the Stranraer to Portpatrick section, a three-span viaduct was necessary to cross the Piltanton Burn near Lochans; it had 36 ft 9 in (11.2 m) spans with a height of 73 ft (22 m).

The gradients on the Portpatrick Railway main line were severe: gently undulating from Castle Douglas to New Galloway, they then formed a stiff climb at 1 in 80 to Loch Skerrow, the alternately falling and rising at 1 in 76 to the summit at Gatehouse of Fleet. There was then an unbroken descent of 6 1/2 miles (10 km) at 1 in 80 to near Palnure. A less constant climb then led to a summit near milepost 40 between Kirkcowan and Glenluce, then falling at a ruling gradient of 1 in 80 nearly to Challoch Junction. From Stranraer there was a stiff continuous climb at 1 in 72 to a summit at Colfin, at an elevation of 326 feet (99 m) above sea level, then a descent at 1 in 80 to Portpatrick.

== The line today ==
Only the Stranraer Harbour to Challoch Junction section is open; and is now served by services on the Glasgow South Western Line.

== Connections to other lines ==
- At Castle Douglas to the Castle Douglas and Dumfries Railway
- At Castle Douglas to the Kirkcudbright Railway
- At Challoch Junction to the Girvan and Portpatrick Junction Railway

== See also ==
- List of closed railway stations in Britain
