= Wigtown County Buildings =

Municipal building in Wigtown, Scotland

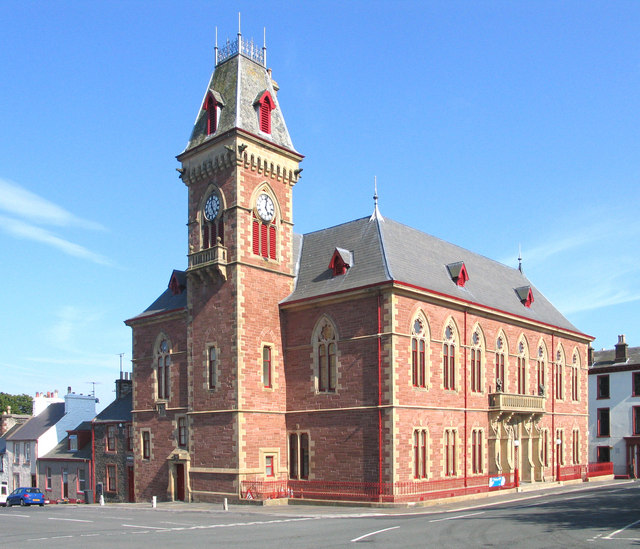
- Wigtown County Buildings

- Shown in Dumfries and Galloway
- 54.8685°N 4.4413°W
- Location: The Square, Wigtown

History
- Built: 1863

Site notes
- Architect: Thomas Brown II
- Architectural style: Gothic Revival style

Listed Building – Category B
- Official name: Wigtown Town Hall (former Wigtown Sheriff Court) including railings, The Square, Wigtown
- Designated: 20 July 1972
- Reference no.: LB42439

Wigtown County Buildings, also known as Wigtown County Buildings and Town Hall, is a municipal building in The Square, Wigtown, Scotland. The structure primarily served as the meeting place and town hall for Wigtown Burgh Council, but was also used for some meetings of Wigtownshire County Council. It is a Category B listed building.

== History ==
The first municipal building in Wigtown was a tolbooth which was completed in the 16th century. Two covenanters, Margaret Maclauchlan and Margaret Wilson, were held in a cell in the tolbooth before being executed by Scottish Episcopalians in 1685 by tying them to stakes on the town's mudflats and allowing them to drown with the rising tide: they are remembered as the Wigtown Martyrs. The tolbooth was replaced by a new town hall which was completed in 1756.

In the early 1860s, burgh officials decided to demolish the 18th century town hall and to erect a structure more in keeping with the importance of Wigtown as the administrative centre of the county of Wigtownshire. The new building was designed by Thomas Brown II in the Gothic Revival style, built in red sandstone and was completed in 1863. The design involved a symmetrical main frontage with eight bays facing onto The Square; the central section of two bays featured a doorway with a stone surround and the burgh coat of arms in the tympanum. The doorway was flanked by buttresses supporting a balcony with heraldic lions at the corners. The other bays on the ground floor and the bays on the first floor were fenestrated with gothic windows. On the north elevation of the building, there was a three-stage projecting tower with louvres and a clock in the third stage and a pyramid-style roof above. A coat of arms, which had been recovered from the 18th century town hall was installed above the door on the northern elevation. Internally, the principal room was the courtroom on the first floor. There was also a cell with a barrel-vaulted ceiling, which had formed part of the 18th century town hall, in the part of the building behind the tower.

Following the implementation of the Local Government (Scotland) Act 1889, which established a uniform system of county councils in Scotland, the new Wigtownshire County Council held its first meeting in the building on 22 May 1890, when it was decided to hold the council's annual meeting each May at Wigtown, but other meetings were to be held alternately at Stranraer and Newton Stewart. The council later acquired Ashwood House on Sun Street, Stranraer to serve as its main offices, close to the Sheriff Court on Lewis Street which was the council's meeting place when it met in Stranraer.

County Buildings in Wigtown continued to serve as the headquarters of Wigtown Burgh Council for much of the 20th century but ceased to be the local seat of government after the enlarged Wigtown District Council was formed at the Council Offices in Sun Street in Stranraer in 1975. However, the building served instead as the meeting place for the local community council.

With financial support from the Heritage Lottery Fund, a programme of refurbishment works was carried out and completed in 2003. The works built on an initiative started in 1999 to make Wigtown the "national book town" for Scotland and involved the creation of a library named after the local author, John McNeillie, and the creation of a small local history museum: items put on display in the museum included a set of early 18th century imperial measures, typically held by local authorities to ensure tradesmen comply with the Weights and Measures Act 1824.

In September 2018, a memorial stone was laid outside the town hall to commemorate the life of Sergeant Louis McGuffie who had been posthumously awarded the Victoria Cross for his actions at the Fifth Battle of Ypres during the First World War.

== See also ==
- List of listed buildings in Wigtown, Dumfries and Galloway
