= Wigtown =

Town in Dumfries and Galloway, Scotland

Coordinates: 54.870°N 4.439°W

Wigtown: Scottish Gaelic: Baile na h-Ùige; Scots: Wigtoun
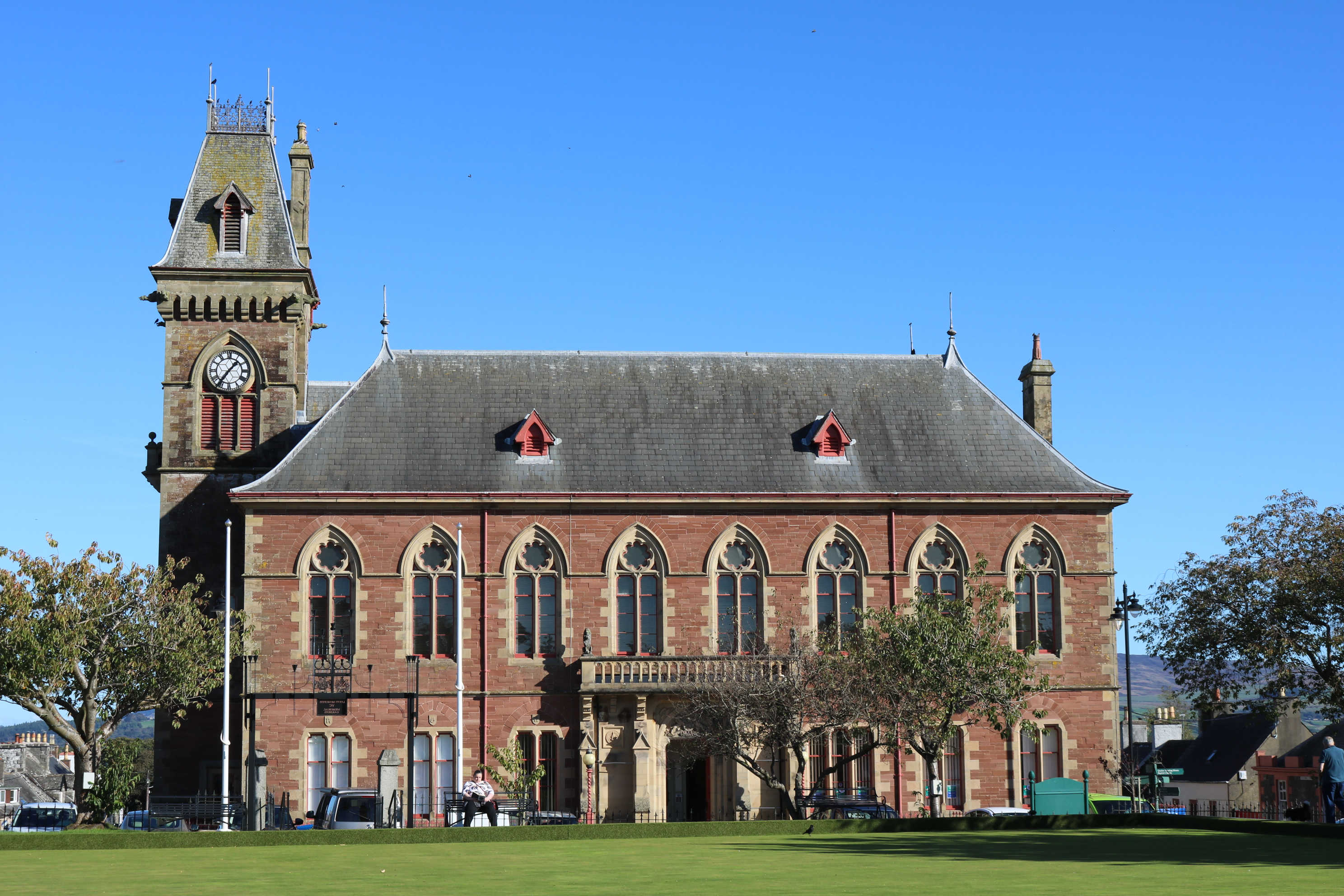
- Wigtown County Buildings, formerly the seat of Wigtownshire County Council

- Location within Dumfries and Galloway
- Population: 859 (2022)
- OS grid reference: NX435555
- Council area: Dumfries and Galloway
- Lieutenancy area: Wigtownshire
- Country: Scotland
- Sovereign state: United Kingdom
- Post town: NEWTON STEWART
- Postcode district: DG8
- Dialling code: 01988
- Police: Scotland
- Fire: Scottish
- Ambulance: Scottish
- UK Parliament: Dumfries and Galloway
- Scottish Parliament: Galloway and West Dumfries

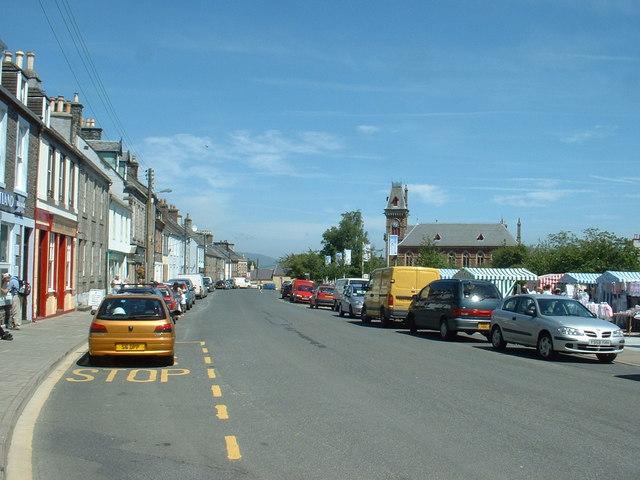
Wigtown

Wigtown (/ˈwɪɡtənˌ -taʊn/ (both used locally); Scottish Gaelic: Baile na h-Ùige) is a small historic market town and former royal burgh in Dumfries and Galloway, Scotland. Historically part of Wigtownshire, of which it is the county town, it lies east of Stranraer and south of Newton Stewart. It had a population of 859 in 2022.

Wigtown is known as "Scotland's National Book Town" with a high concentration of second-hand book shops and an annual book festival. It is part of the Machars peninsula.

== History ==
=== Name origins ===
W.F.H. Nicolaisen offered two explanations for the place-name Wigtown. One theory was that it meant 'dwelling place', from the Old English 'wic-ton'; however, if it is the same as Wigton in Cumbria, which was 'Wiggeton' in 1162 and 'Wigeton' in 1262, it may be 'Wigca's farm'. Other sources have suggested a Norse root with 'Vik' meaning 'bay', giving the origin as a translation of 'The town on the bay'.

=== Neolithic Age ===
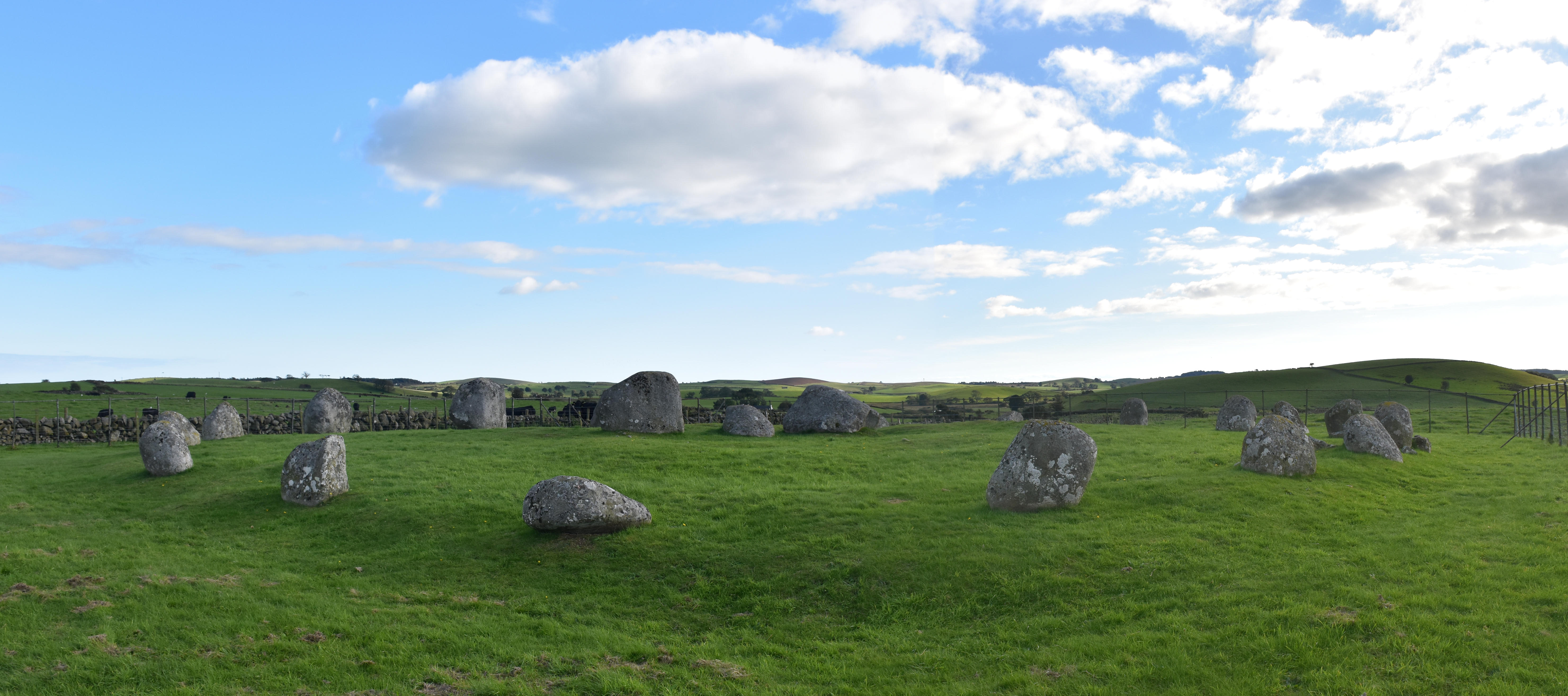
Torhouse Stone Circle, dating from the 2nd millennium BC, is one of the best preserved sites in Britain. It is c. 6 m (20 ft) in diameter.

The surrounding area (the Machars peninsula) is rich in prehistoric remains, most notably the Torhousekie Standing Stones, a Neolithic stone circle set on a raised platform of smaller stones. It consists of nineteen boulders up to 5 feet high aligned to the winter solstice, surrounding a ring cairn on which there are 3 large stones (flankers), two upright and one recumbent. On a low ridge across the road from the circle there are another three stones.

=== Early history ===
Andrew Symson, a 17th-century minister, suggested the first settlement would have stood on low-lying sands between the present-day Wigtown and Creetown. Wigtown had two ports (gates) which may have been closed at night to form a large cattle enclosure. These were East Port, opposite a site later occupied by the British Linen Bank, and the West Port, which stood opposite the mouth of the High Vennel.

Blackfriars, the Dominican friary, was founded at "Friarland" north of the mouth of the Bladnoch, south-east of the town of Wigtown, by Devorgilla in around 1267.

Wigtown Castle was in existence by 1291, on flat land down by the River Bladnoch, (outlines clearly seen on an aerial view), whilst the town and church were on a hill, "an inversion of the usual arrangements". Nothing remains of the castle, although a strong natural site and indication of a large enclosed and defended area seems to point to a castle of the Edwardian type (Edward I) dating from the end of the 13th century. The site of the castle was excavated after a fashion about 1830, by a Captain Robert M’Kerlie and a team of volunteers. The outlines of a building were clearly traced on that occasion and a ditch, which had been broad, was distinctly seen on the north where there was also a semi-circular ridge of considerable elevation said to be the remains of the castle's outer wall. A few years later, a reporter in the New Statistical Account wrote that a fosse was quite discernible, although "the foundations of the walls cannot now be traced". Mortar and "other remains indicative of an ancient building" were still to be observed.

The town developed as port and became a royal burgh in 1292. Medieval Wigtown was built on a rectangular pattern with burgage plots around the present day Square (Main Street) and later, the West Port. The royal burgh was granted to Sir Malcolm Fleming by David II in 1341. In 1372 Wigtown was acquired by Archibald the Grim Lord of Galloway. When he later became Earl of Douglas in 1384, it became attached to that earldom. It was restored to its former tenure as a royal burgh as a result of the forfeiture of the Douglases in 1455. Its status was formally recognised by a royal charter in 1457.

=== Wigtown Martyrs ===
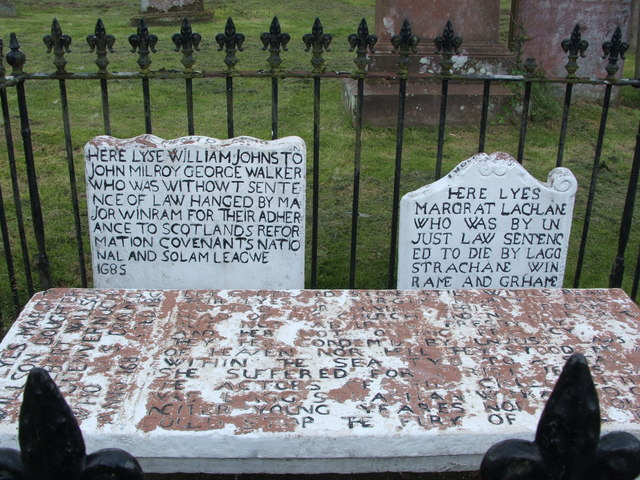
Covenanters' graves, in the graveyard of St Machutus's Church, Wigtown. The recumbent stone in the foreground is the grave of Margaret Willson, and, behind it, the upright stone on the right is that of "Margrat Lachlane" (Margaret McLaughlin), these being the two women who were executed by drowning (according to tradition, at the location of the present-day Martyrs' Stake). The upright stone on the left is that of the three Covenanter men who were hanged at the same time.

Monuments to the Wigtown Martyrs exist in Wigtown. During "The Killing Time" of the Covenanters in the 17th century, Margaret McLachlan, an elderly woman in her 60s, and Margaret Willson, a teenager, were, for refusing to swear an oath declaring James VII of Scotland as head of the church, sentenced to be tied to stakes in the tidal channel of the River Bladnoch near its entrance to Wigtown Bay to be drowned by the incoming tide. The execution date was 11 May 1685. The ploy was that the younger woman might be persuaded to change her mind after watching the older woman drown. The strategy failed and both died. This execution was carried out by dragoons under the command of Major Windram in the presence of Sir Robert Grierson of Lag who held the King's Commission to suppress the rebels in the South West. Their story, as told in various sources, tells how the women were betrayed by an informer. After about a month in prison they were tried as rebels and sentenced to death by drowning. The story of the Wigtown Martyrs was among those collected by Robert Wodrow and published in his History of the Sufferings of the Church of Scotland from the Restoration to the Revolution. The Church of Scotland synod had decided in 1708 to collect accounts of persecution under the Stuart monarchs, and persuaded Wodrow to take on the research. He wrote that Thomas Wilson "lives now in his father's room, and is ready to attest all I am writing."

=== Later history ===
In 1809, the Main Street Square gardens were enclosed by the town council as a public space, having formerly been used for keeping hens and other livestock. The enclosed area was planted and later, a bowling green and tennis courts would be added. Wigtown Bowling Club was established in 1830 and continues to run, being one of the oldest in Scotland. In the 19th century, a prison was established for the town on Harbour Road, being in operation until the 1940s when it closed (it is now a private residence). A gas works was established in the town in the mid 19th century in North Back Street and it remained in operation until the end of the Second World War.

An early reference to a tolbooth in Wigtown occurs in the late 16th century, and it is possible that this structure was blown up by gunpowder to make way for the new town hall which was completed in 1756. This municipal building in its turn gave way to the Wigtown County Buildings which were erected in 1862. The buildings served as the county Headquarters of Wigtownshire and are built of red sandstone from north-west England.

Wigtown removed its first mercat cross in the late 17th century (which stood at the east end of the Square). A second market cross was erected to replace the earlier one and instead built at the junction of Main street between 1816 and 1818.

Andrew Symson, a 17th-century minister of the church at Kirkinner, left a description of Wigtown. Writing in 1684, he described Wigtown as having "a market for horses and young phillies...which the borderers come and buy in great numbers."

Residents of Wigtown and the surrounding area earned their livings in a variety of ways. An 18th-century observer, Samuel Robinson commented that from its peculiar position in relation to the sea, the county of Wigtown offered many singular advantages to the landing of smuggled goods and smugglers were not slow in taking advantage of this: however after a barracks was built "the trade and those who conducted it were ruined".

Robinson, describing Wigtown, also noted that "the greatest number of houses were of a homely character, thatched and one storey high".

The Newton Stewart to Whithorn branch railway line had a station at Wigtown which opened in 1877.

=== Recent history ===
Wigtown was described by William Learmonth in 1920 as the quaintest county town in Scotland.

RAF Wigtown was constructed on the outskirts of the town and opened in 1941. Under the control of 29 Group RAF, the Station was home to No. 1 Air Observers School, later No. 1 Advanced Flying Unit (Observer), as well as providing a short-term home to several operational RAF squadrons. The Station was closed in 1948. Today it is very occasionally used by light aircraft, sometimes being referred to as Baldoon Airfield.

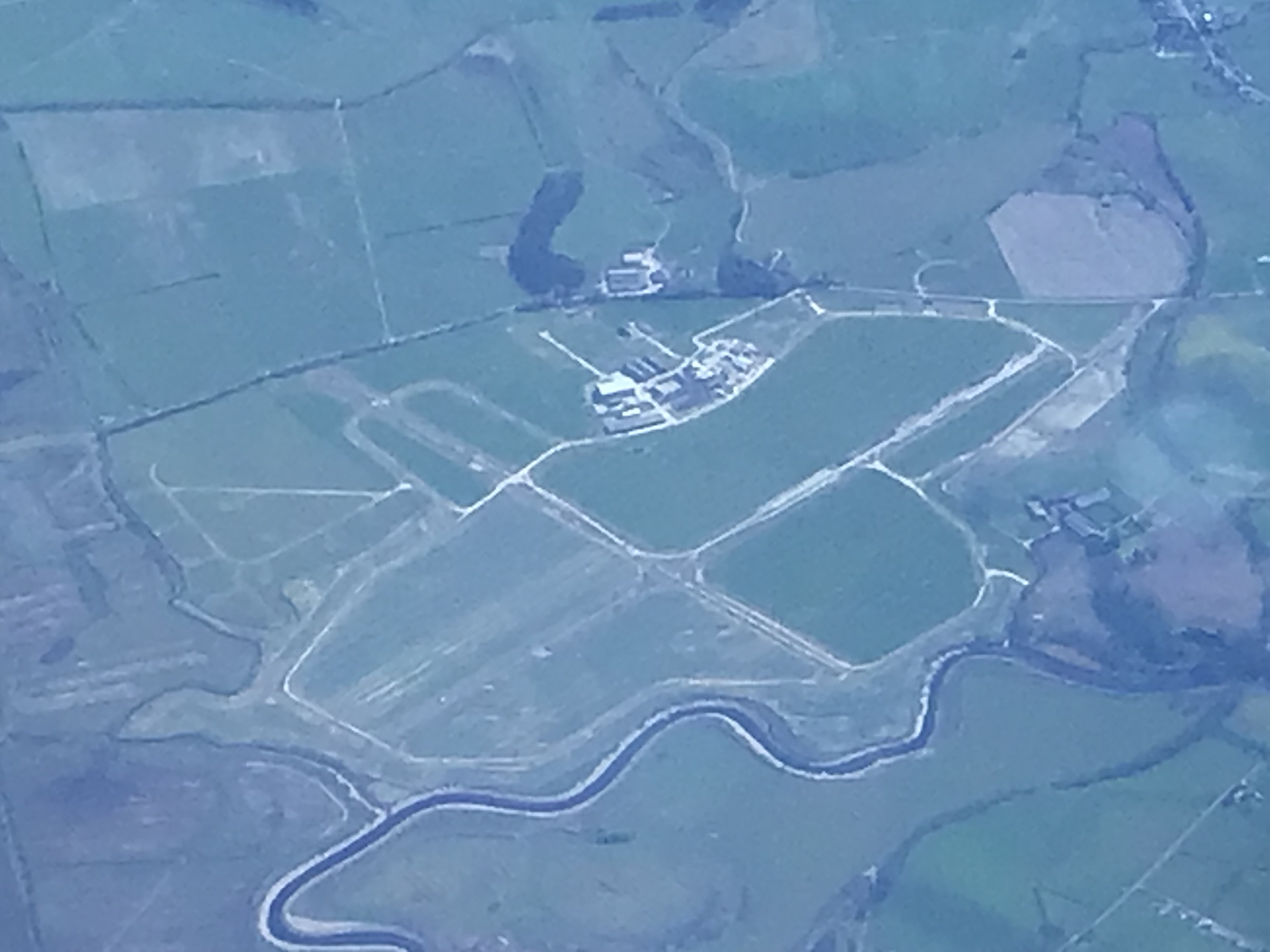
Aerial view of RAF Wigtown/Baldoon Airfield (April 2023)

In the 1990s Wigtown became Scotland's "book town". However, in contrast to Hay-on-Wye, Wigtown's status as a book town was planned, in order to regenerate a very depressed town (the main employers, the creamery and distillery, having closed in the 1990s), although the distillery (Bladnoch) has now re-opened and is distilling its own malt whisky. There was a national search in Scotland for a candidate town. The Wigtown Book Festival was first held in 1999 and grew to be the second largest book festival in Scotland. There are currently around a dozen bookshops in the town.

In 2020 Wigtown residents created a new festival called the Wigtown Shindy which started as a single day event to celebrate the community's support for each other during the COVID-19 pandemic. It has grown in subsequent years to a 4-day music and family entertainment festival running through the 3rd weekend in August in the McGuffie Gardens.

== Education ==
Wigtown Primary School is based in New Road in Wigtown. The primary school is housed in a building dating from 1850, that has since been altered and expanded. Before 1850, a grammar school provided education for all ages in the town in a building built in 1712.

== Churches ==
Wigtown Parish Church was designed in the Gothic Revival style and completed in 1858.

Sacred Heart Catholic Church was designed in the Gothic Revival style and completed in 1879 to a design by the Edinburgh architect John George Garden Brown.

Wigtown Quaker Meeting House is as at Chapel Court, South Main Street.

Wigtown Baptist Church is in Southfield Lane.

A Seceder's Meeting house and U.F. Church, later known as Wigtown West Church of Scotland was built in 1750 to the west of the town but demolished in the late 20th century.

== Landmarks and culture ==
Wigtown lies less than 1 mile (2 kilometres) from Bladnoch, a village with a distillery producing malt whisky of the same name. The River Bladnoch can be fished for Atlantic salmon and has historically been well known as one of Scotland's finest rivers producing spring fish. It meets the River Cree in Wigtown Bay, meandering through a large area of salt marsh which has been designated as a Local Nature Reserve (LNR). Wigtown Bay is the largest LNR in Britain, and is home to a wealth of wildlife, particularly birds. Some people come to admire them from the comfort of the viewing hides situated near the harbour, others, wildfowlers, come to harvest some of the plentiful ducks and geese attracted by the extensive conservation work carried out by the Wigtown Wildfowling Club. The first pair of ospreys to return to Galloway in over 100 years arrived in 2004. A live camera link to their nest was created and can be viewed in the Wigtown County Buildings.

To the east of Wigtown is The Martyrs' Stake, a monument marking the traditional site where the Wigtown Martyrs were drowned in the 17th century. Their graves are in the Parish Church cemetery. There is a small cell in the County Buildings in which they were imprisoned prior to their execution. This cell is all that remains of a much older building which was largely destroyed to make way for the County Buildings (built in 1862).

=== Events ===
The Wigtown Book Festival is a ten-day literary festival held annually in Wigtown. The first event took place in 1999.

The Wigtown Agricultural Show is an annual event held in August, having been held since 1811.

=== Bookshops ===
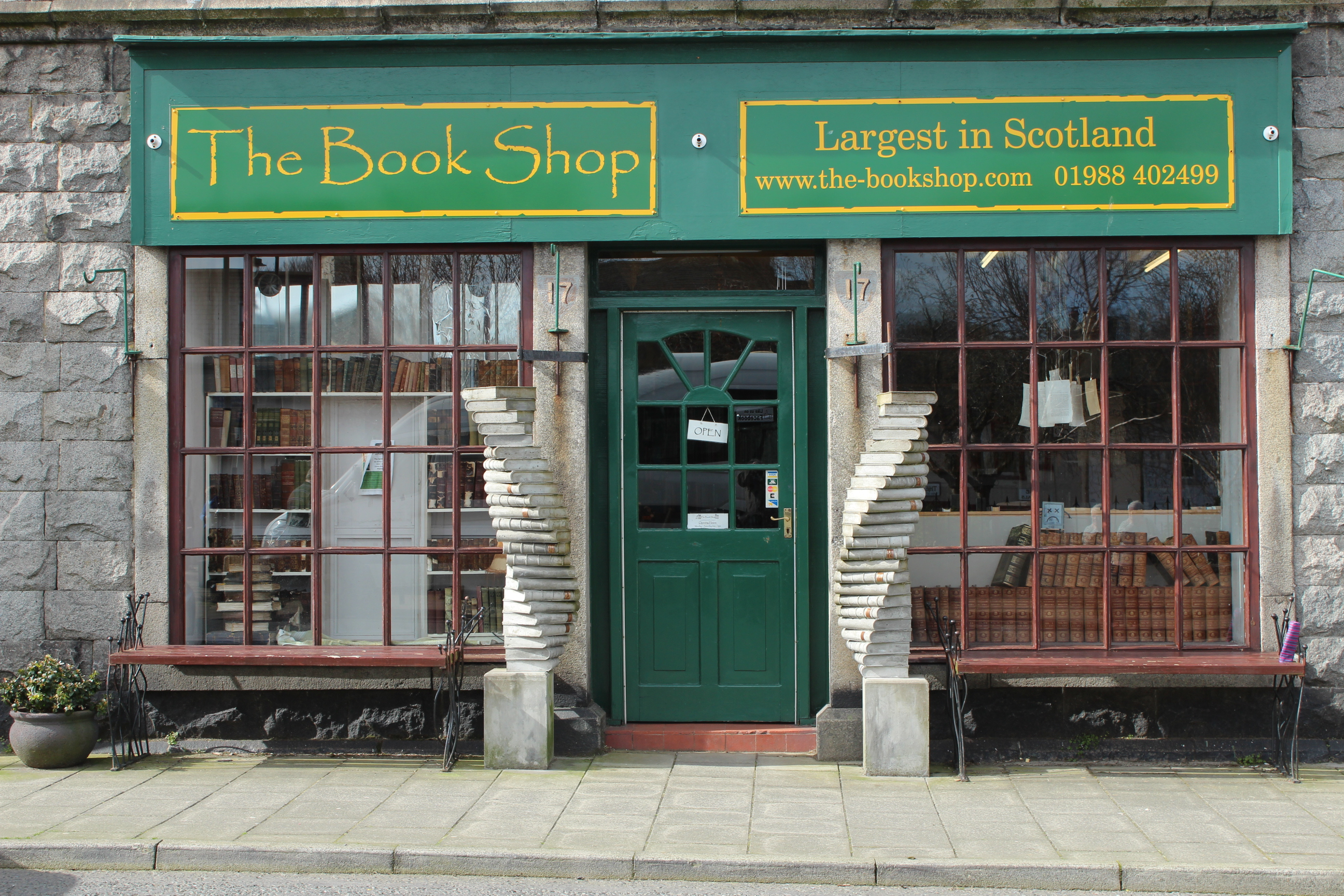
The Bookshop on N Main Street in Wigtown

In 2018, Wigtown had 13 retail bookshops, one of which was mail-order. The town has its own bookseller's association. The bookshops mean that Wigtown is estimated to have several hundred thousand books in the town.

The Old Bank bookshop is located in a former bank and customs house. As the Customs House fell out of use with the decline of the port, it was bought and expanded as a branch of the City of Glasgow Bank, later the National Bank.

The Bookshop in Wigtown is Scotland's second largest second-hand bookshop. It is reported to have a mile of shelving and some 100,000 books. Leakeys bookshop in Inverness is both larger and has more stock. The owner, Shaun Bythell, has written a book about his experiences selling books in the town.

The Open Book is a bookshop that is operated by customers who can take temporary charge of the shop and live in the accommodation above.

== In popular culture ==
Jessica A. Fox's Three Things You Need to Know About Rockets (2013) is her account of following her dream and moving from Los Angeles and a job at NASA to help run a bookshop in Wigtown and finding love.

Shaun Bythell's The Diary of a Bookseller, published 2017, Confessions of a Bookseller (2019) and Remainders of the Day (2022) detail his experiences as the owner of The Bookshop, Scotland's largest second-hand bookshop.

Kathleen Hart's Devorgilla Days, published in 2021 is a memoir of life in Scotland's book town, it is a celebration of the community who helped heal her, including the thousands of followers on Instagram where she is known as Poshpedlar.

The BBC reported on 2 October 2018 that options on Fox's book and Bythell's first book had been bought by "a Hollywood film company" with the idea of combining them to create a movie.

In the Harry Potter universe, the Wigtown Wanderers quidditch team come from the town.

Heather Cox and Jessica Morgan's 2020 book, The Heir Affair, had significant scenes set in and around Wigtown. The main characters stay in an AirBnb above a book shop that they're also able to run.

== Notable people ==
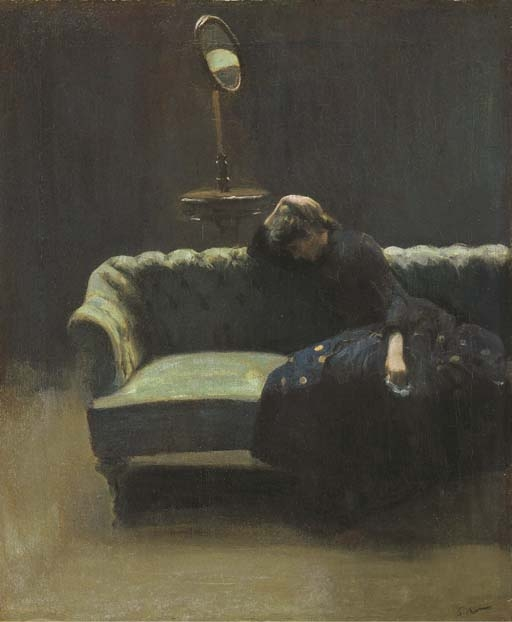
Painting of Helen D'Oyly Carte by Walter Richard Sickert, c. 1885, entitled The Acting Manager

- John McConnell Black, botanist and linguist.
- Robert Cance, member of the Wisconsin State Assembly.
- Helen D'Oyly Carte, hotelier and theatre producer and manager.
- Although the actor James Robertson Justice was not (as he claimed) born at Wigtown, he did have ancestral links with the area.
- Dave Kevan, professional footballer for Notts County and Stoke City between 1985 and 1994; ex caretaker-manager at Notts County.
- Paul Laverty, Ken Loach's preferred screenwriter (I, Daniel Blake, The Wind that Shakes the Barley, Carla's Song, etc.), grew up in the town and was educated at All Souls' School in Wigtown.
- Adrian J McDowall, BAFTA award-winning film and television director grew up in Wigtown.
- John McFadyean, veterinary surgeon and professor of veterinary science was born in Wigtown.
- Louis McGuffie, Victoria Cross holder. He was aged 24 and the son of Mrs Catherine McGuffie of 1 North Main Street, Wigtown. He is buried at the Zantvoorde British Cemetery, Zonnebeke, Belgium.
- Ian Niall, author. His book The Wigtown Ploughman gave its name to one of the local pubs.
- Graeme Parker, hoof trimmer and YouTuber as The Hoof GP
- Mary Broadfoot Walker, a physician noted for first demonstrating the effectiveness of physostigmine in treating myasthenia gravis.
- Margaret Wilson, 17th century Covenanter martyr for the Free Church in Scotland.

== See also ==
- List of listed buildings in Wigtown, Dumfries and Galloway
- Hay on Wye, the Welsh national book town.
- Sedbergh, the English national book town.

== Gallery ==
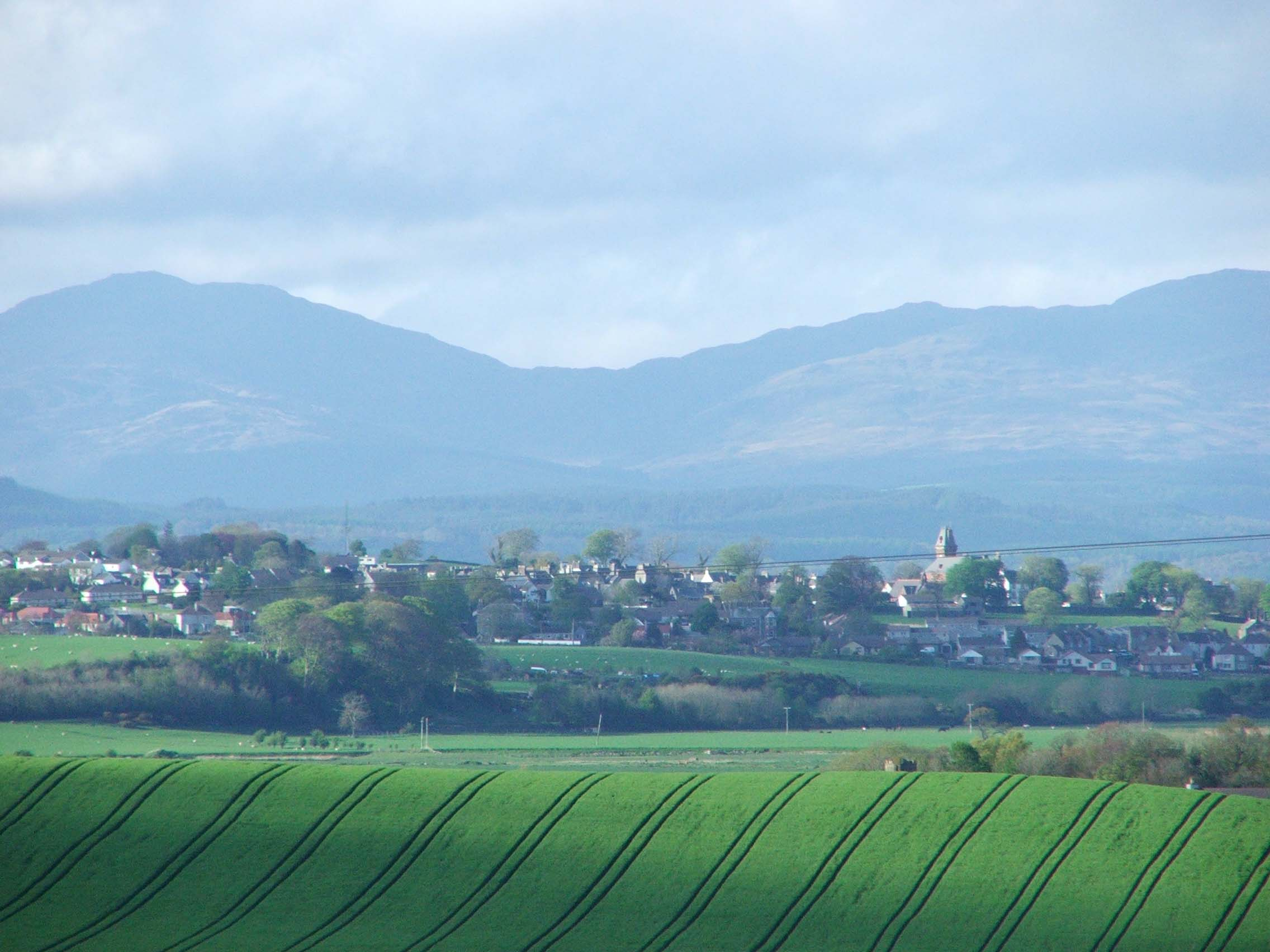
Wigtown and the Galloway Hills, seen from Kirkinner.

The Square looking West from the County Buildings.

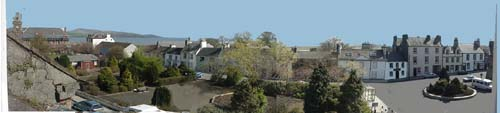
The Square prior to renovation in 2002.

Wigtown Church and the Salt Marsh.

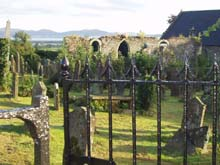
St Machute's church ruins, Wigtown.

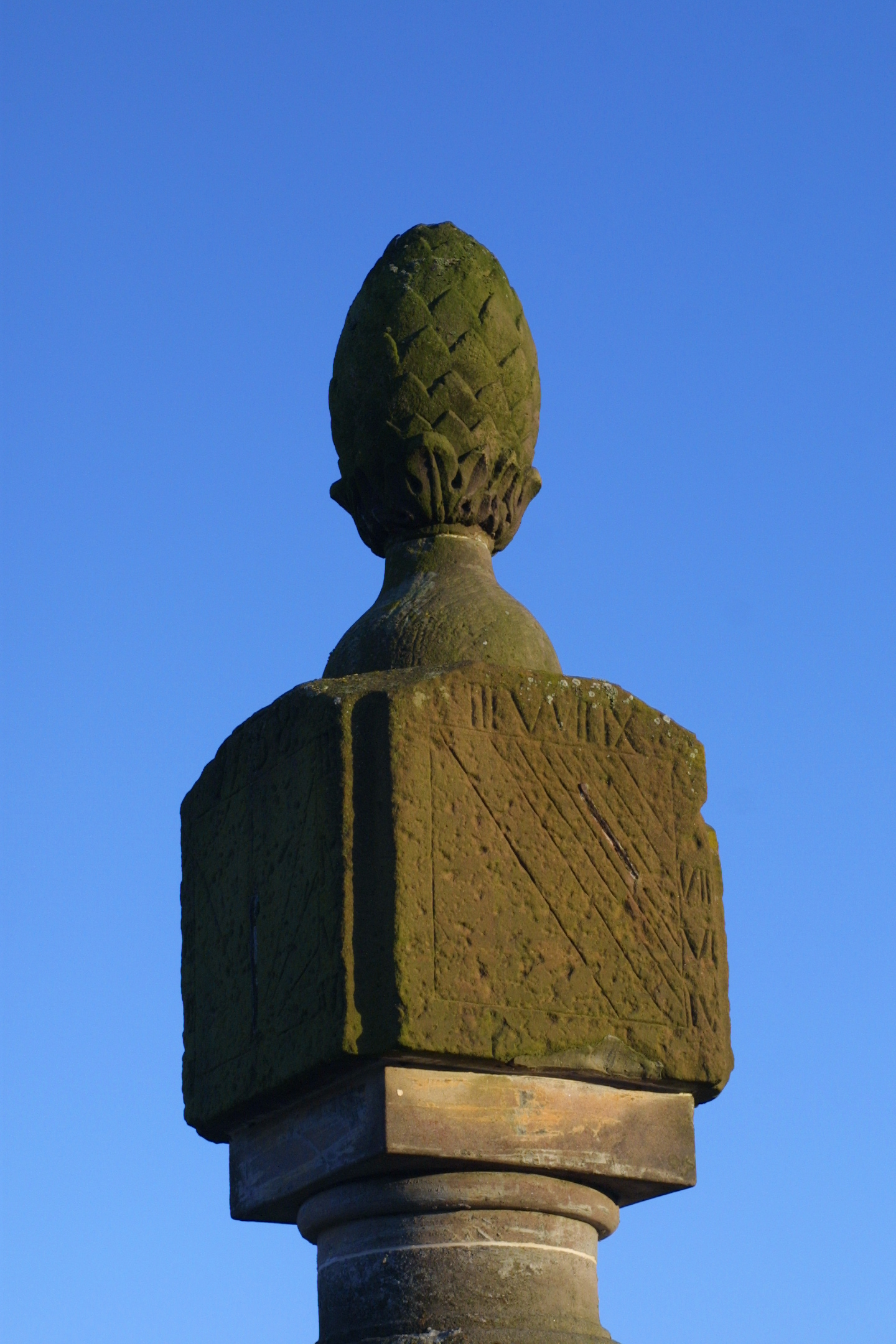
The original Mercat Cross.

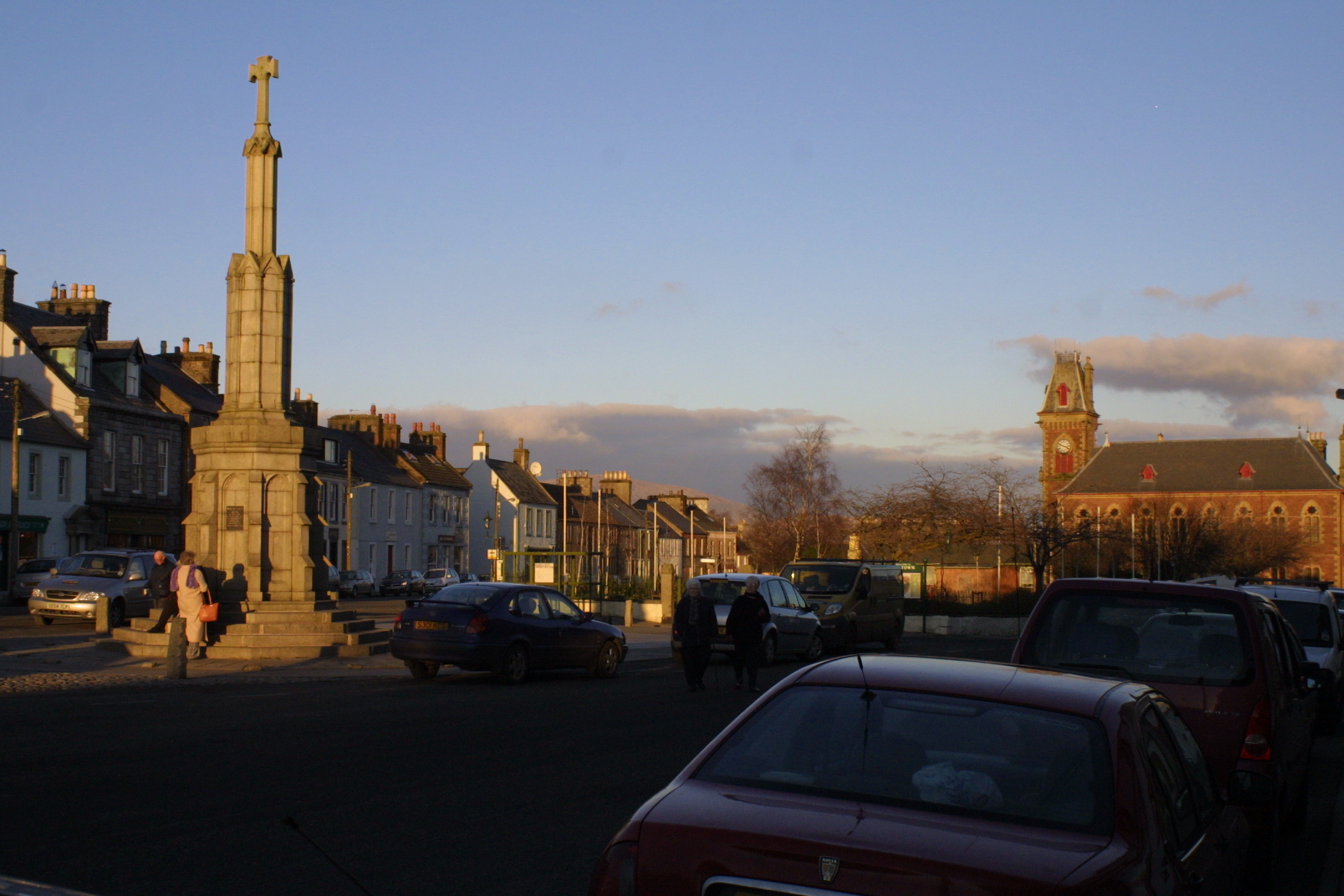
The 1816 Mercat Cross.

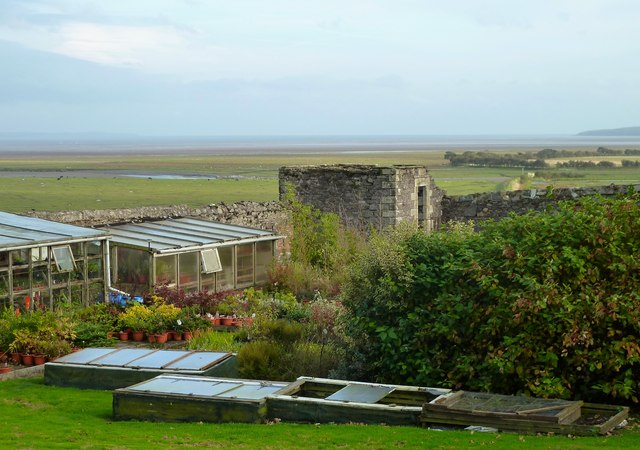
Wigtown town wall, Bank Street, inside the moat.

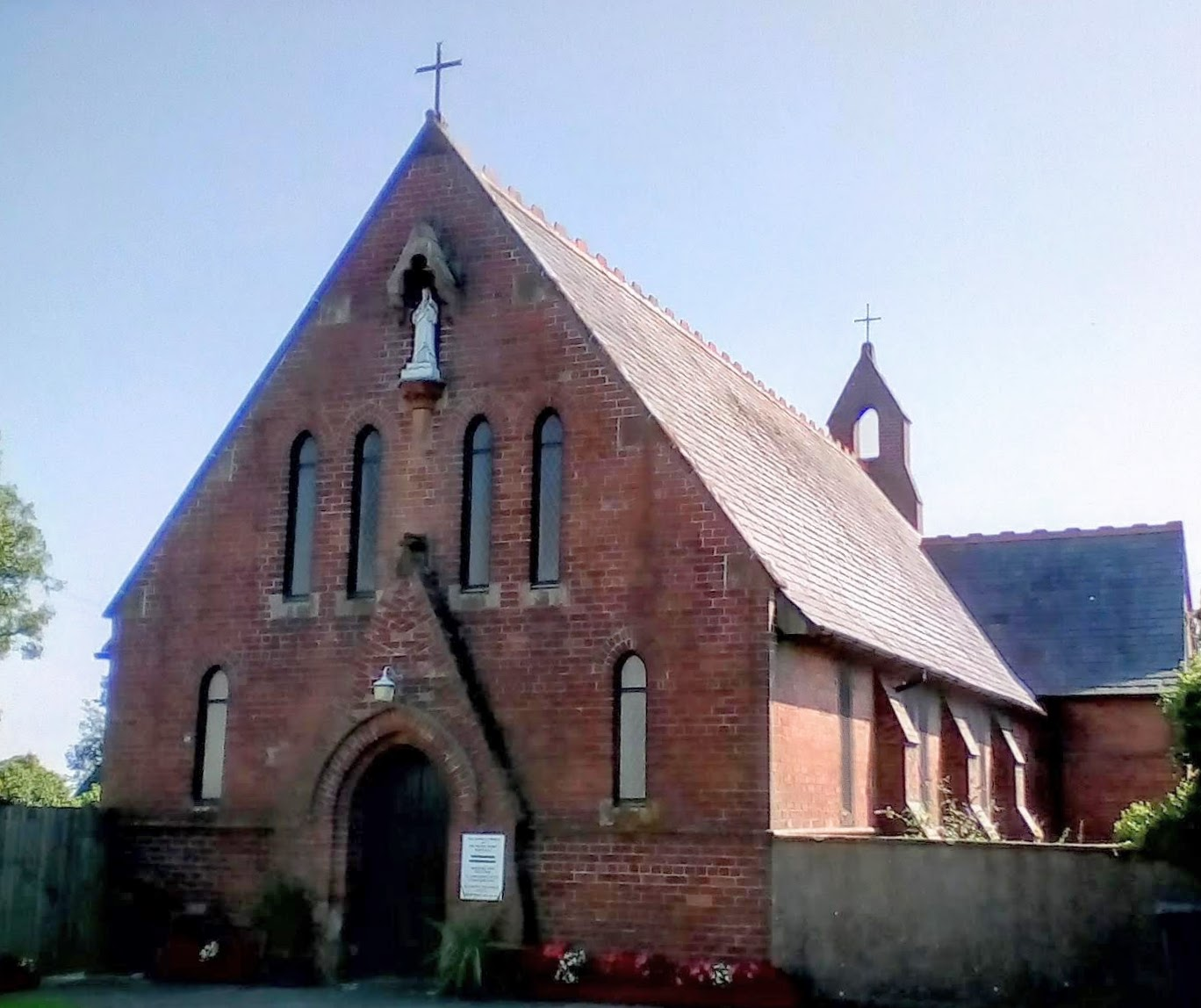
Church of the Sacred Heart, 1879
