= Mark Napier (historian) =

Scottish lawyer, biographer and historical author

Mark Napier (24 July 1798 – 23 November 1879) was a Scottish lawyer, biographer and historical author. He was called to the Bar, practised as an advocate, and was made Sheriff of Dumfries and Galloway. Napier wrote from a strongly Cavalier and Jacobite standpoint. He published Memoirs of the Napiers, of Montrose, and of Graham of Claverhouse, the last of which gave rise to controversy.

Napier was a member of the Edinburgh Calotype Club and the Photographic Society of Scotland. Founded in 1843 the club is one of the world's first photographic clubs.

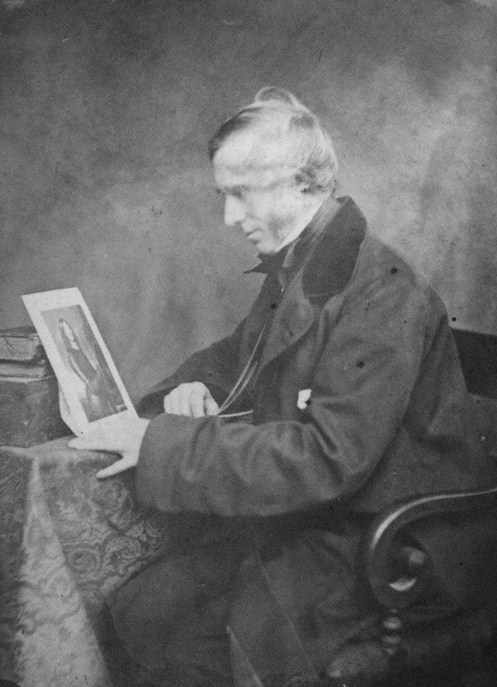
Mark Napier, photograph c.1860.

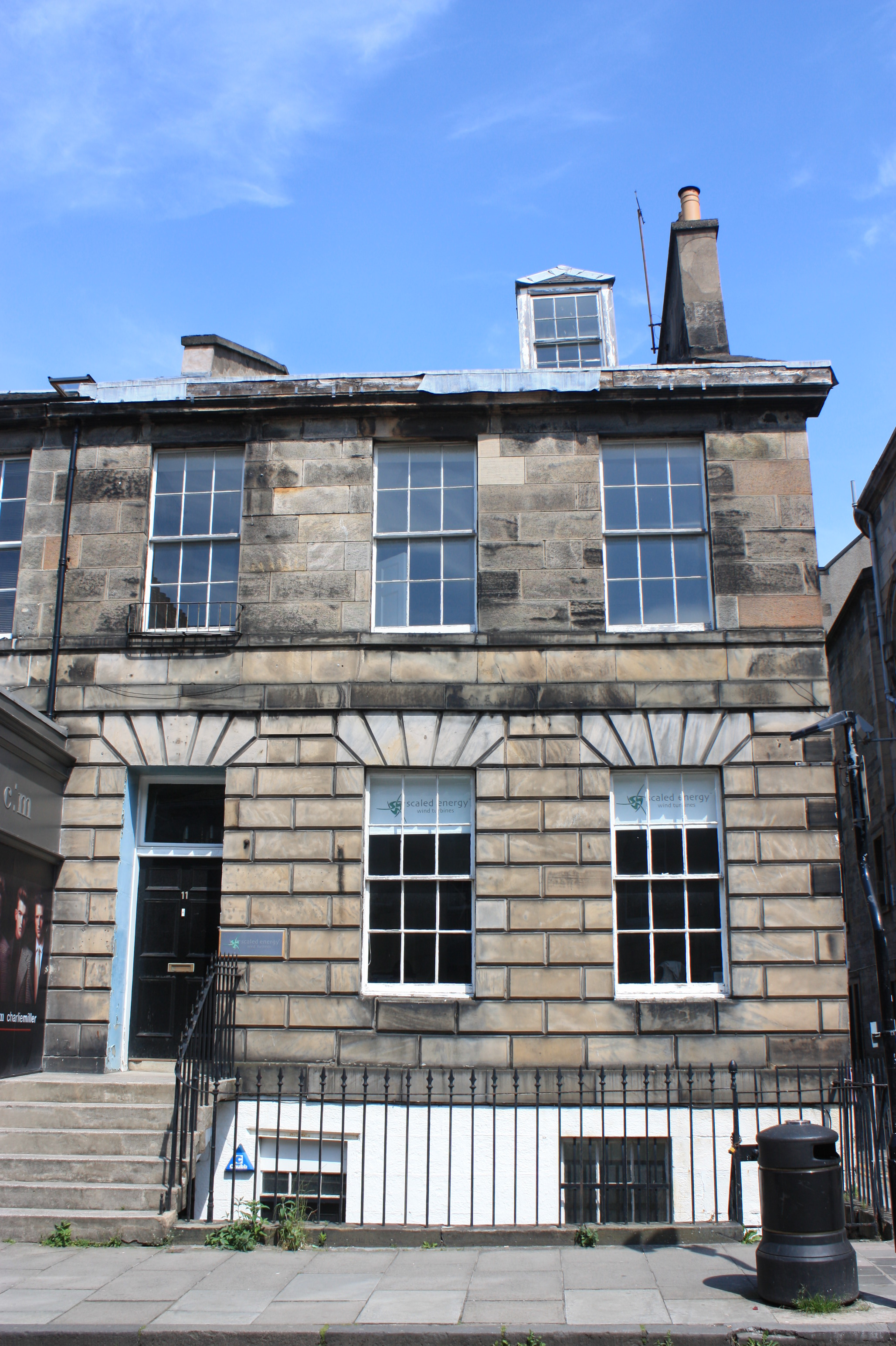
Napier's house at 11 Stafford Street, Edinburgh

== Life ==
Born on 24 July 1798, he was descended from the Napiers of Merchiston. His great-grandfather Francis Napier, 6th Lord Napier had five sons, of whom the youngest, Mark, a major-general in the army, was the grandfather of the biographer. His father was Francis Napier, a writer to the signet in Edinburgh, and his mother was Mary Elizabeth Jane Douglas, eldest daughter of Colonel Archibald Hamilton of Innerwick, Haddingtonshire. He was educated at Edinburgh High School and the university of Edinburgh, and passed advocate at the Scottish bar in 1820.

In the 1830s Mark Napier is listed as an advocate living at 11 Stafford Street in Edinburgh's west end. In 1844 he was appointed sheriff-depute of Dumfriesshire, to which Galloway was subsequently added (in 1874), an office he held for the rest his life.

He died at his residence at 6 Ainslie Place on the Moray Estate in west Edinburgh, on 23 November 1879, as the oldest member of the Faculty of Advocates then discharging legal duties. He is buried in St Cuthberts churchyard in Edinburgh.

== Works ==
Napier's reputation was literary rather than legal: his only strictly legal works were The Law of Prescription in Scotland, 1839, 2nd edit. 1854, and Letters to the Commissioners of Supply of the County of Dumfries, in Reply to a Report of a Committee of their Number on the Subject of Sheriff Courts, 1852, 2nd edit. 1852.

In 1834 Napier published Memoirs of John Napier of Merchiston; and in 1839 he edited Napier's unpublished manuscripts with an introduction. His other biographical works suffered from partisan exaggerations arising from his Jacobitism. On the Marquis of Montrose he published Montrose and the Covenanters, 1838, Life and Times of Montrose, 1840, Memorials of Montrose and his Times, a collection of original documents edited for the Maitland Club (vol. i. 1848, and vol. ii. 1850); and the summation in Memoirs of the Marquis of Montrose, two vols. 1856.

Napier's Memorials of Graham of Claverhouse, Viscount Dundee, 1859–62, included letters of Claverhouse and other documents not previously available in print. The publication raised acrimonious controversy related to the execution by drowning of the two Covenanter women, Margaret Maclachlan and Margaret Wilson, who are still known as the "Wigtown Martyrs", because Napier raised doubts as to whether the two women's execution ever took place at all; and he replied to his objectors in the Case for the Crown in re the Wigtown Martyrs proved to be Myths versus Wodrow and Lord Macaulay, Patrick the Pedlar and Principal Tulloch, 1863; and in History Rescued, in Reply to History Vindicated (by the Rev. Archibald Stewart), 1870.

Napier in 1835 published a History of the Partition of Lennox; the Napiers had an historical connection with the earldom of Lennox. He also edited vols. ii. and iii. of John Spotiswood's History of the Church of Scotland for the Bannatyne Club in 1847. The Lennox of Auld, an Epistolary Review of “The Lennox” by William Fraser was published posthumously in 1880, edited by his son Francis.

== Family ==
Napier married his cousin Charlotte Ogilvy (1806-1883), daughter of Alexander Ogilvy, and widow of William Dick Macfarlane, and by her had a son and a daughter: Francis John Hamilton Scott, commander in the Royal Navy, and Frances Anne, married to Lieutenant-colonel Cecil Rice.
