= James Anson Otho Brooke =

Recipient of the Victoria Cross

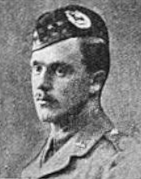
- Born: 3 February 1884; Aberdeen, Scotland
- Died: 29 October 1914 (aged 30); Gheluvelt, Belgium
- Burial place: Zantvoorde British Cemetery
- Military career
- Allegiance: United Kingdom
- Branch: British Army
- Service years: 1905–1914
- Rank: Captain
- Units: The Gordon Highlanders
- Conflicts: First World War †
- Awards: Victoria Cross

James Anson Otho Brooke VC (3 February 1884 – 29 October 1914) was a Scottish recipient of the Victoria Cross, the highest and most prestigious award for gallantry in the face of the enemy that can be awarded to British and Commonwealth forces.

== Early life and education ==
Brooke was from a landed gentry family, the eldest of five sons and two daughters of Harry Vesey Brooke, JP, DL, of Fairley, Countesswells, Aberdeenshire, Scotland, who had served as a captain in the 92nd Gordon Highlanders, and Patricia, daughter of James Gregory Moir-Byres, of a landed gentry family of Tonley, Aberdeenshire from which came the architect, antiquary and art dealer James Byres. Brooke's paternal grandfather was Sir Arthur Brinsley Brooke, 2nd Baronet, whose descendant, the 5th Baronet, was created Viscount Brookeborough.

Brooke was educated at Wellington College, Berkshire, and at the Royal Military College, Sandhurst, and was commissioned as a second lieutenant in the Gordon Highlanders 11 October 1905, joining the 1st Battalion of the regiment at Cork in Ireland.

== Military career ==
Having been promoted to lieutenant in 1907, Brooke was transferred to the 2nd Battalion, Gordon Highlanders, British Army, based in India until 1913, then in Egypt until the outbreak of the First World War, when they were ordered to the front, Brooke serving as senior subaltern and assistant adjutant. The following deed took place during the First Battle of Ypres for which he was awarded the VC.

For conspicuous bravery and great ability near Gheluvelt on the 29th October, in leading two attacks on the German trenches under heavy rifle fire and machine gun fire, regaining a lost trench at a very critical moment. He was killed on that day. By his marked coolness and promptitude on this occasion Lieutenant Brooke prevented the enemy from breaking through our line, at a time when a general counter-attack could not have been organised.

Lieutenant Brooke was posthumously promoted to captain, effective to September 1914.

== Memorials ==
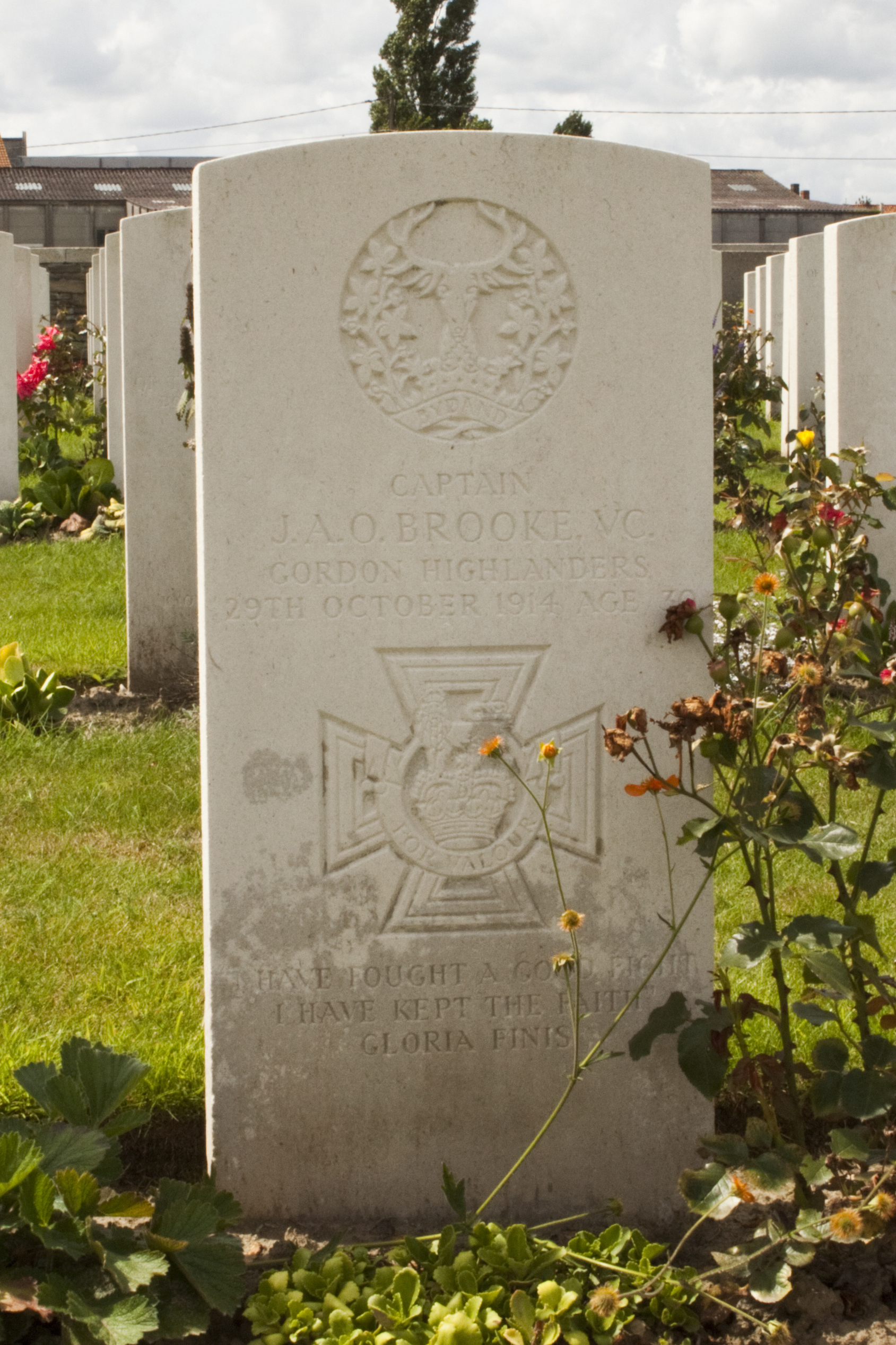
Captain Brooke's grave in Zantvoorde British Cemetery, Zonnebeke, Belgium

Captain Brooke's remains were interred at Zantvoorde British Cemetery (CWGC), Zonnebeke, Belgium (near Ypres). His name also appears on the family grave at Springbank Cemetery, Aberdeen.

His name also appears on Aberdeen War Memorial, Colebrook War Memorial, St Ronan's Church Memorial, and Enniskillen War Memorial. A 21 cm mortar he captured is on display at Enniskillen Castle.

A Victoria Cross commemorate stone bearing his name was laid at Kingswells Hall near Aberdeen in October 2014 to mark the centenary of the award. The hall was built with the help of Brooke and the church war memorial sited opposite also bears his name.

== The medal ==
His Victoria Cross is displayed at the Gordon Highlanders Museum in Aberdeen, Scotland.

== See also ==
- List of 1914 First World War Victoria Cross recipients
