= Blackfriars, Wigtown =

Friary in Wigtown, Scotland

Coordinates: 54.867°N 4.442°W

The Church of the Friars Preachers of the Annunciation of the Blessed Virgin Mary at Wigtown, commonly called Blackfriars, was a mendicant friary of the Dominican Order founded in the 13th century at Wigtown, Galloway, Scotland. The Chronica Extracta said that it was founded by Dervorguilla of Galloway, who died in 1290.

Perhaps because of the remoteness of Wigtown, the history of the house is extremely badly documented and obscure. It appears on 7 March 1297, in receipt of money from the fermes of burghs. One of its priors, Ninian Shanks, appears on record on 10 May 1490. The prior along with four friars grant a charter on 21 December 1560, the year of the Scottish Reformation. It was presumably disbanded in the following decade, its revenues probably being granted to the burgh, as was the case with other friaries of the time.
