= List of listed buildings in Wigtown, Dumfries and Galloway =

This is a list of listed buildings in the civil parish of Wigtown, in Dumfries and Galloway, Scotland.

== List ==
Name	Location	Date listed	Geo-coordinates	Notes	Category	LB number	Image
Harbour Road Dunmore With Gates Gatepiers And Boundary Walls			54°52′00″N 4°26′22″W		C(S)	42390	Upload Photo
10 And 12 High Street			54°52′01″N 4°26′42″W		C(S)	42396	Upload Photo
3A And 3B North Main Street			54°52′08″N 4°26′32″W		C(S)	42401	Upload Photo
17 North Main Street			54°52′06″N 4°26′37″W		B	42409	Upload Photo
27 North Main Street			54°52′04″N 4°26′40″W		C(S)	42414	Upload Photo
6 South Main Street			54°52′06″N 4°26′28″W		B	42422	Upload Photo
18 South Main Street			54°52′04″N 4°26′33″W		B	42427	Upload Photo
24 South Main Street			54°52′03″N 4°26′36″W		B	42430	Upload Photo
Windy Hill Martyrs Monument And Enclosure			54°52′08″N 4°26′51″W		B	42442	Upload another image
1-4 (Inclusive Nos) Acre Place			54°51′57″N 4°26′41″W		C(S)	42336	Upload Photo
26 And 28 Agnew Crescent			54°51′58″N 4°26′39″W		C(S)	42349	Upload Photo
7 Bank Street			54°52′08″N 4°26′28″W		C(S)	42351	Upload Photo
8 Bank Street			54°52′08″N 4°26′28″W		C(S)	42358	Upload Photo
24 Bank Street			54°52′09″N 4°26′25″W		C(S)	42362	Upload Photo
4 And 5 Bladnoch Village			54°51′29″N 4°27′26″W		C(S)	42366	Upload Photo
27 South Main Street, Post Office			54°52′03″N 4°26′37″W		C(S)	43768	Upload Photo
19 Bladnoch Village			54°51′29″N 4°27′32″W		C(S)	42374	Upload Photo
6 And 8 High Street			54°52′02″N 4°26′41″W		C(S)	42395	Upload Photo
28 High Street			54°52′01″N 4°26′45″W		C(S)	42397	Upload Photo
32 High Street			54°52′00″N 4°26′45″W		C(S)	42399	Upload Photo
5 Low Vennel Smithy			54°52′09″N 4°26′31″W		C(S)	42400	Upload Photo
34 North Main Street The Granite House			54°52′03″N 4°26′42″W		C(S)	42419	Upload Photo
16 South Main Street Sunningdale			54°52′04″N 4°26′33″W		C(S)	42426	Upload Photo
22 South Mains Street			54°52′04″N 4°26′35″W		B	42428	Upload Photo
Woodside With Coach House, Retaining Walls And Railings			54°51′52″N 4°26′49″W		B	42443	Upload Photo
11 And 13 Agnew Crescent			54°52′00″N 4°26′41″W		C(S)	42338	Upload Photo
4 Bank Street			54°52′08″N 4°26′29″W		C(S)	42356	Upload Photo
2 Bladnoch Village			54°51′29″N 4°27′25″W		C(S)	42365	Upload Photo
11 Bladnoch Village			54°51′29″N 4°27′28″W		C(S)	42368	Upload Photo
13, 14 And 15 Bladnoch Village			54°51′29″N 4°27′29″W		C(S)	42370	Upload Photo
26 Bladnoch Village			54°51′29″N 4°27′36″W		C(S)	42380	Upload Photo
Fountainblue Terrace Craigmount Guest House			54°52′01″N 4°26′50″W		C(S)	42388	Upload Photo
13 North Main Street			54°52′06″N 4°26′35″W		C(S)	42406	Upload Photo
23 South Main Street Galloway Inn			54°52′04″N 4°26′35″W		B	42429	Upload Photo
31 And 32 South Main Street			54°52′02″N 4°26′39″W		B	42435	Upload Photo
Bank Street Bank House Garden Wall And Garden Houses			54°52′08″N 4°26′24″W		B	42363	Upload Photo
Bladnoch Bridge			54°51′28″N 4°27′43″W		B	19151	Upload another image See more images
24 Bladnoch Village			54°51′29″N 4°27′34″W		C(S)	42378	Upload Photo
27 Bladnoch Village			54°51′29″N 4°27′36″W		C(S)	42381	Upload Photo
32 Bladnoch Village			54°51′30″N 4°27′38″W		C(S)	42383	Upload Photo
Harbour Road, Old Prison House With Boundary Walls (Former Jail And Police Station)			54°51′57″N 4°26′26″W		B	42391	Upload Photo
30 High Street			54°52′00″N 4°26′45″W		C(S)	42398	Upload Photo
5 And 7 North Main Street			54°52′08″N 4°26′33″W		C(S)	42403	Upload Photo
29 And 30 North Main Street			54°52′03″N 4°26′40″W		B	42416	Upload Photo
31 North Main Street			54°52′03″N 4°26′41″W		C(S)	42417	Upload Photo
29 And 30 South Main Street County Hotel			54°52′03″N 4°26′39″W		C(S)	42434	Upload Photo
The Square Old Market Cross			54°52′04″N 4°26′37″W		B	42438	Upload another image See more images
The Square Town Hall			54°52′07″N 4°26′29″W		B	42439	Upload another image
21 Agnew Crescent			54°51′59″N 4°26′41″W		C(S)	42342	Upload Photo
10 Bank Street			54°52′09″N 4°26′28″W		B	42359	Upload Photo
20 Bank Street			54°52′09″N 4°26′26″W		C(S)	42360	Upload Photo
22 Bank Street			54°52′09″N 4°26′25″W		C(S)	42361	Upload Photo
17 17A And 17B Bladnoch Village			54°51′29″N 4°27′30″W		C(S)	42372	Upload Photo
9 Harbour Road Former Uf Manse Boundary Wall And Gatepiers			54°52′02″N 4°26′23″W		B	42392	Upload Photo
18 North Main Street			54°52′05″N 4°26′37″W		C(S)	42410	Upload Photo
28 North Main Street			54°52′03″N 4°26′40″W		C(S)	42415	Upload Photo
Wigtown Old Parish Church (St Machute's Church)			54°52′12″N 4°26′22″W		B	42440	Upload another image See more images
18-20 (Even Nos) Agnew Crescent			54°51′59″N 4°26′40″W		B	42348	Upload Photo
3 Bank Street			54°52′07″N 4°26′40″W		C(S)	42350	Upload Photo
11 Bank Street			54°52′08″N 4°26′27″W		C(S)	42353	Upload Photo
1 Bladnoch Village			54°51′29″N 4°27′24″W		C(S)	42364	Upload Photo
16 Bladnoch Village			54°51′29″N 4°27′30″W		B	42371	Upload Photo
18 Bladnoch Village Ashleigh			54°51′29″N 4°27′31″W		B	42373	Upload Photo
29 Bladnoch Village			54°51′29″N 4°27′38″W		C(S)	42382	Upload Photo
34 Bladnoch Village And Railings			54°51′30″N 4°27′40″W		C(S)	42385	Upload Photo
4 High Street			54°52′02″N 4°26′41″W		C(S)	42394	Upload Photo
11 North Main Street			54°52′07″N 4°26′34″W		B	42404	Upload Photo
19 North Main Street			54°52′05″N 4°26′37″W		C(S)	42411	Upload Photo
21 North Main Street, Bank Of Scotland			54°52′05″N 4°26′38″W		C(S)	42413	Upload Photo
8 South Main Street The Old Custom House And Bank With Railings			54°52′06″N 4°26′28″W		B	42423	Upload Photo
26 South Main Street			54°52′03″N 4°26′37″W		C(S)	42432	Upload Photo
Wigtown Parish Church (Church Of Scotland) And Churchyard			54°52′12″N 4°26′21″W		B	42441	Upload another image See more images
19 Agnew Crescent			54°51′59″N 4°26′41″W		C(S)	42341	Upload Photo
6 Agnew Crescent			54°52′01″N 4°26′39″W		C(S)	42343	Upload Photo
10 Agnew Crescent			54°52′00″N 4°26′39″W		C(S)	42345	Upload Photo
9 Bank Street			54°52′08″N 4°26′27″W		C(S)	42352	Upload Photo
2 Bank Street			54°52′08″N 4°26′30″W		C(S)	42355	Upload Photo
7 And 8 Bladnoch			54°51′29″N 4°27′27″W		C(S)	42367	Upload Photo
Newmilns Mill			54°51′58″N 4°29′28″W		C(S)	19153	Upload Photo
Torhousemuir House And Gatepiers			54°52′50″N 4°30′15″W		C(S)	19154	Upload Photo
20 Bladnoch Village			54°51′29″N 4°27′32″W		C(S)	42375	Upload Photo
Harbour Road Applegarth			54°52′07″N 4°26′25″W		C(S)	42389	Upload Photo
2 High Street			54°52′02″N 4°26′41″W		C(S)	42393	Upload Photo
12 North Main Street			54°52′07″N 4°26′35″W		C(S)	42405	Upload Photo
14 North Main Street			54°52′06″N 4°26′36″W		C(S)	42407	Upload Photo
15 North Main Street			54°52′06″N 4°26′36″W		C(S)	42408	Upload Photo
20 North Main Street			54°52′05″N 4°26′38″W		C(S)	42412	Upload Photo
33 North Main Street The Granite House			54°52′03″N 4°26′41″W		C(S)	42418	Upload Photo
14 South Main Street			54°52′05″N 4°26′32″W		C(S)	42424	Upload Photo
25 South Main Street			54°52′03″N 4°26′37″W		C(S)	42431	Upload Photo
The Square, New Market Cross			54°52′04″N 4°26′37″W		B	42437	Upload another image See more images
15 Agnew Crescent Rowan House			54°52′00″N 4°26′41″W		C(S)	42339	Upload Photo
17 Agnew Crescent			54°51′59″N 4°26′41″W		C(S)	42340	Upload Photo
14 Agnew Crescent			54°52′00″N 4°26′40″W		C(S)	42346	Upload Photo
16 Agnew Crescent			54°51′59″N 4°26′40″W		C(S)	42347	Upload Photo
13 And 15 Bank Street			54°52′08″N 4°26′27″W		C(S)	42354	Upload Photo
6 Bank Street			54°52′08″N 4°26′29″W		B	42357	Upload Photo
Bladnoch Distillery			54°51′30″N 4°27′45″W		B	19152	Upload another image See more images
4 Agnew Crescent			54°52′01″N 4°26′40″W		C(S)	43767	Upload Photo
22 Bladnoch Village			54°51′29″N 4°27′33″W		C(S)	42376	Upload Photo
23 Bladnoch Village			54°51′29″N 4°27′34″W		C(S)	42377	Upload Photo
25 Bladnoch Village Riverside			54°51′29″N 4°27′35″W		B	42379	Upload Photo
33 Bladnoch Village			54°51′30″N 4°27′39″W		B	42384	Upload Photo
Church Lane, The Laigh House (Former Manse)			54°52′16″N 4°26′26″W		C(S)	42386	Upload Photo
Dunure House Boundary Walls Gates And Outbuildings			54°51′54″N 4°26′40″W		B	42387	Upload Photo
4 North Main Street The Red Lion Inn			54°52′08″N 4°26′32″W		C(S)	42402	Upload Photo
South Main Street Sacred Heart R.C. Church With Gates Gateposts, Railings And Boundary Walls			54°52′04″N 4°26′31″W		C(S)	42420	Upload another image See more images
4 South Main Street And Garden Wall			54°52′07″N 4°26′28″W		B	42421	Upload Photo
15 South Main Street			54°52′05″N 4°26′32″W		C(S)	42425	Upload Photo
28 South Main Street Craiglachie			54°52′03″N 4°26′38″W		B	42433	Upload Photo
33 And 34 South Main Street			54°52′02″N 4°26′40″W		C(S)	42436	Upload Photo
9 Agnew Crescent			54°52′00″N 4°26′41″W		C(S)	42337	Upload Photo
8 Agnew Crescent			54°52′01″N 4°26′39″W		C(S)	42344	Upload Photo
12 Bladnoch Village			54°51′29″N 4°27′28″W		C(S)	42369	Upload Photo

== Key ==
The scheme for classifying buildings in Scotland is:

- Category A: "buildings of national or international importance, either architectural or historic; or fine, little-altered examples of some particular period, style or building type."
- Category B: "buildings of regional or more than local importance; or major examples of some particular period, style or building type, which may have been altered."
- Category C: "buildings of local importance; lesser examples of any period, style, or building type, as originally constructed or moderately altered; and simple traditional buildings which group well with other listed buildings."

In March 2016 there were 47,288 listed buildings in Scotland. Of these, 8% were Category A, and 50% were Category B, with the remaining 42% being Category C.
