= Louis McGuffie =

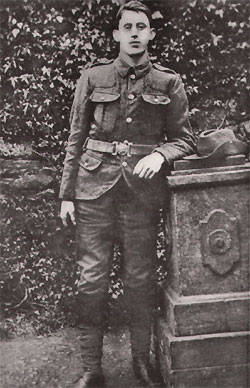
- Born: 15 March 1893; Wigtown, Wigtownshire
- Died: 4 October 1918 (aged 25) †; Wytschaete, Belgium
- Burial place: Zantvoorde British Cemetery
- Military career
- Allegiance: United Kingdom
- Branch: British Army
- Rank: Sergeant
- Units: The King's Own Scottish Borderers
- Conflicts: World War I: Gallipoli campaign; Sinai and Palestine campaign; Western Front; Hundred Days Offensive; Fifth Battle of Ypres †
- Awards: Victoria Cross

Louis McGuffie VC (15 March 1893 – 4 October 1918) was a Scottish recipient of the Victoria Cross, the highest and most prestigious award for gallantry in the face of the enemy that can be awarded to British and Commonwealth forces. He is a soldier with The King's Own Scottish Borderers. He was awarded the VC for his actions in late September 1918, during the Hundred Days Offensive of the First World War. He was killed in action a few days later.

== Early life ==
Louis McGuffie was born on 15 March 1893 in Wigtown, a town in Galloway, Scotland. He was one of four sons born to Edward McGuffie and Catherine née Gilmour. He attended Wigtown Public School and then joined the British Army. He enlisted in the 1/5th Battalion of The King's Own Scottish Borderers. He had three brothers who also enlisted.

== First World War ==
McGuffie served with the 1/5th Battalion in the Gallipoli Campaign as part of the 52nd Division. After the evacuation from Gallipoli, he participated with the battalion in the Sinai and Palestine Campaign before it was transferred to the Western Front in France.

By the time of the Hundred Days Offensive, he was a sergeant. With the battalion part of 103rd Brigade, 34th Division, on 28 September 1918 it was involved in attacks on Wytschaete Ridge, near Ypres, as part of the Fifth Battle of Ypres. McGuffie had taken command of a platoon due to its officers becoming casualties and helped deal with a strongpoint known as Picadilly Farm, as well as several other German-occupied posts that were delaying the advance. Wytschaete Ridge was captured the following day. However, McGuffie was killed in action a few days later on 4 October 1918. For his actions on 28 September 1918, he was awarded the Victoria Cross (VC). The VC, instituted in 1856, was the highest award for valour that could be bestowed on a soldier of the British Empire. The citation read as follows:

For most conspicuous bravery and resourceful leadership under heavy fire near Wytschaete on September 28th 1918. During the advance on Piccadilly Farm, he single-handed, entered several dug-outs and took many prisoners, and during subsequent operations dealt similarly with dug-out after dug-out, forcing one officer and twenty-five other ranks to surrender. During consolidation of the first objective he pursued and brought back several of the enemy who were slipping away, and he was instrumental in releasing some British soldiers who were being led off as prisoners. Later in the day, when in command of a platoon, he led it with the utmost dash and resource, capturing many prisoners. This very gallant soldier was subsequently killed by a shell.

— The London Gazette, 13 December 1918

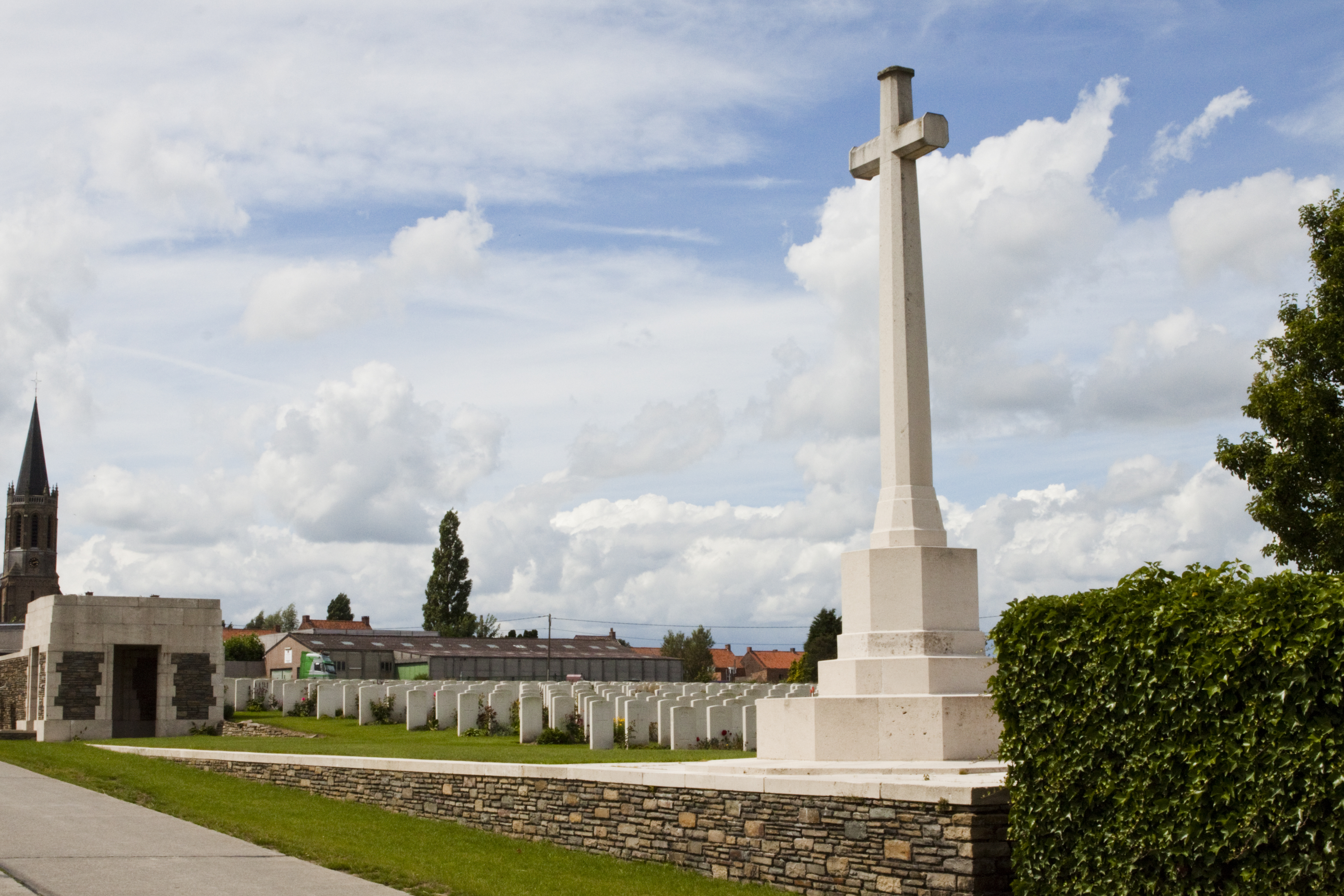
Zantvoorde British Cemetery, where McGuffie is buried

McGuffie is buried in Zantvoorde British Cemetery, near Ypres, in Belgium. King George V presented McGuffie's VC to his mother in a ceremony at Buckingham Palace on 17 May 1919. In his memory, a tablet was laid into the wall of the Wigtown County building in late 1919. His name is also listed on the Wigtown War Memorial.

One hundred years to the day after the events which earned Sgt McGuffie his Victoria Cross, on 28 September 2018 a paving stone and commemorative archway, commissioned by Wigtown Community Council, were unveiled at the entrance to Wigtown's Louis McGuffie VC Memorial Gardens, which includes the town's lawn bowling green and lawns.

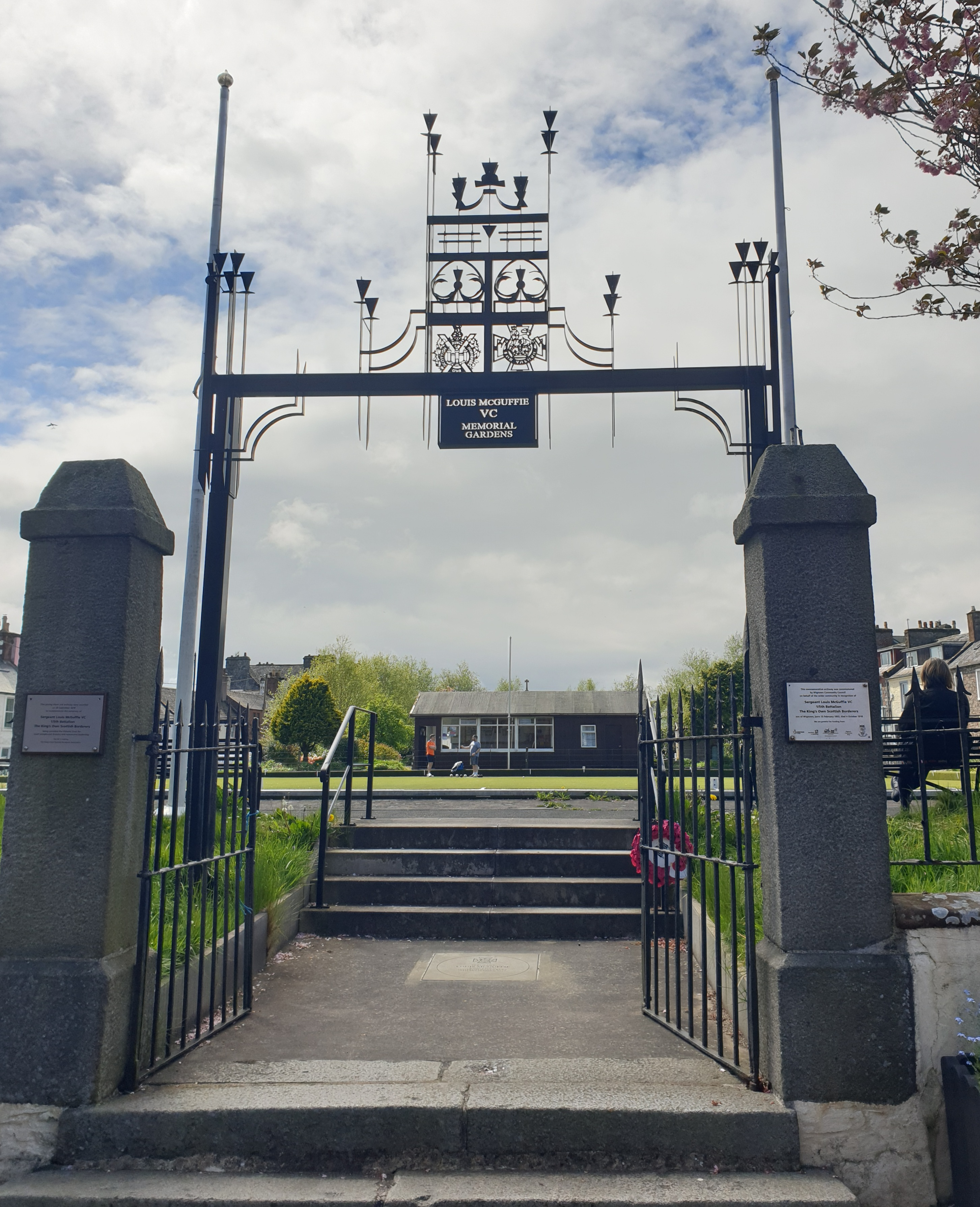
The Sgt Louis McGuffie VC Memorial Archway, Wigtown, Dumfries & Galloway, Scotland

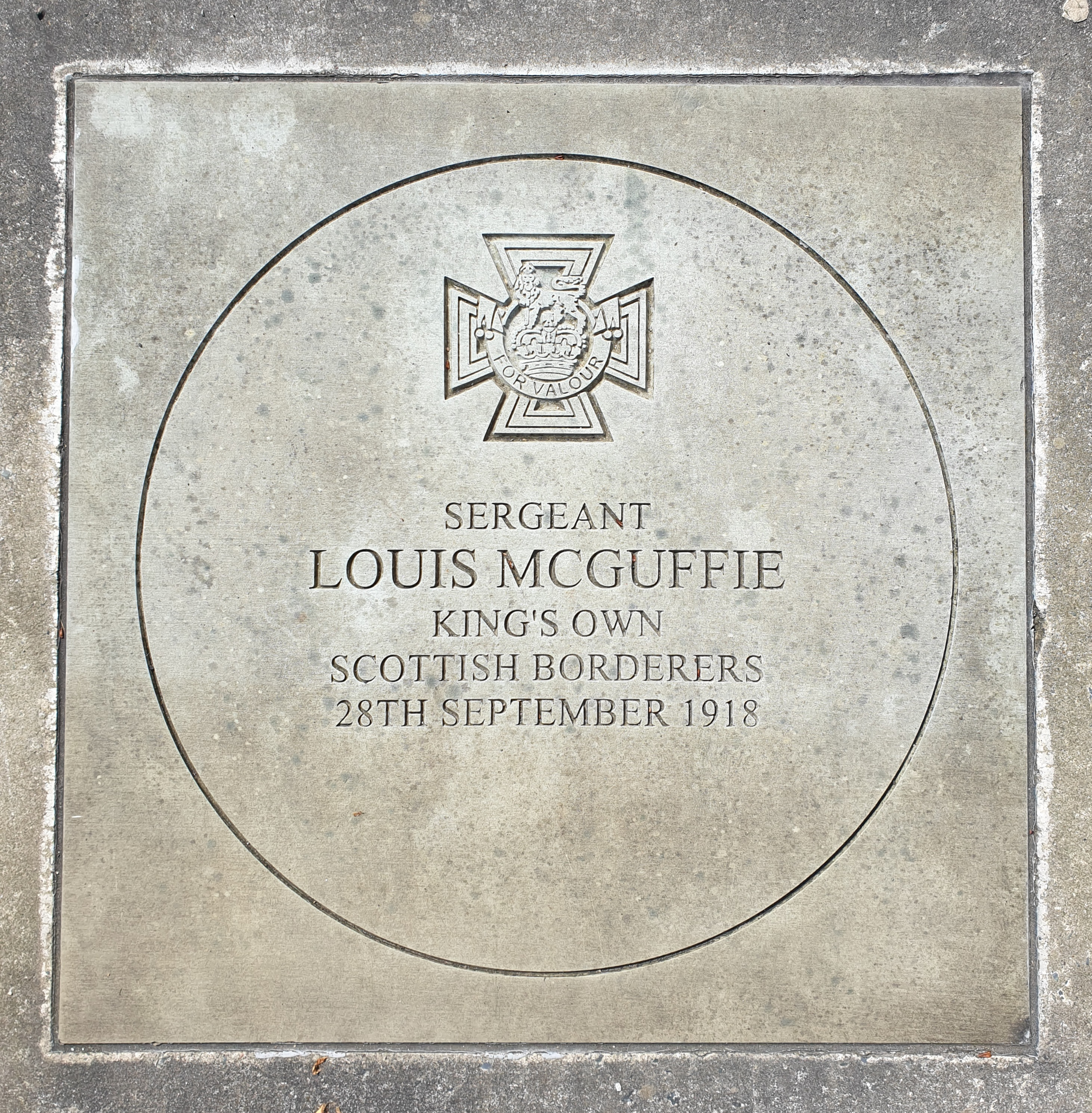
The Sgt Louis McGuffie VC Memorial Stone, Wigtown, Dumfries & Galloway, Scotland

== The medal ==
In 1971, a family member donated McGuffie's VC and other campaign medals, which included the 1914-15 Star, the British War Medal, and the Victory Medal, to the Regimental Museum of The Kings Own Scottish Borderers, Berwick upon Tweed in Northumberland.

== Bibliography ==
- Ashcroft, Michael (2007) [2006]. Victoria Cross Heroes. London, United Kingdom: Headline Review. ISBN 978-0-7553-1633-5.
- Gliddon, Gerald (2014) [2000]. The Final Days 1918. VCs of the First World War. Stroud, Gloucestershire: The History Press. ISBN 978-0-7509-5368-9.
