= Zantvoorde British Cemetery =

WWI CWGC cemetery in Belgium

- Commonwealth War Graves Commission
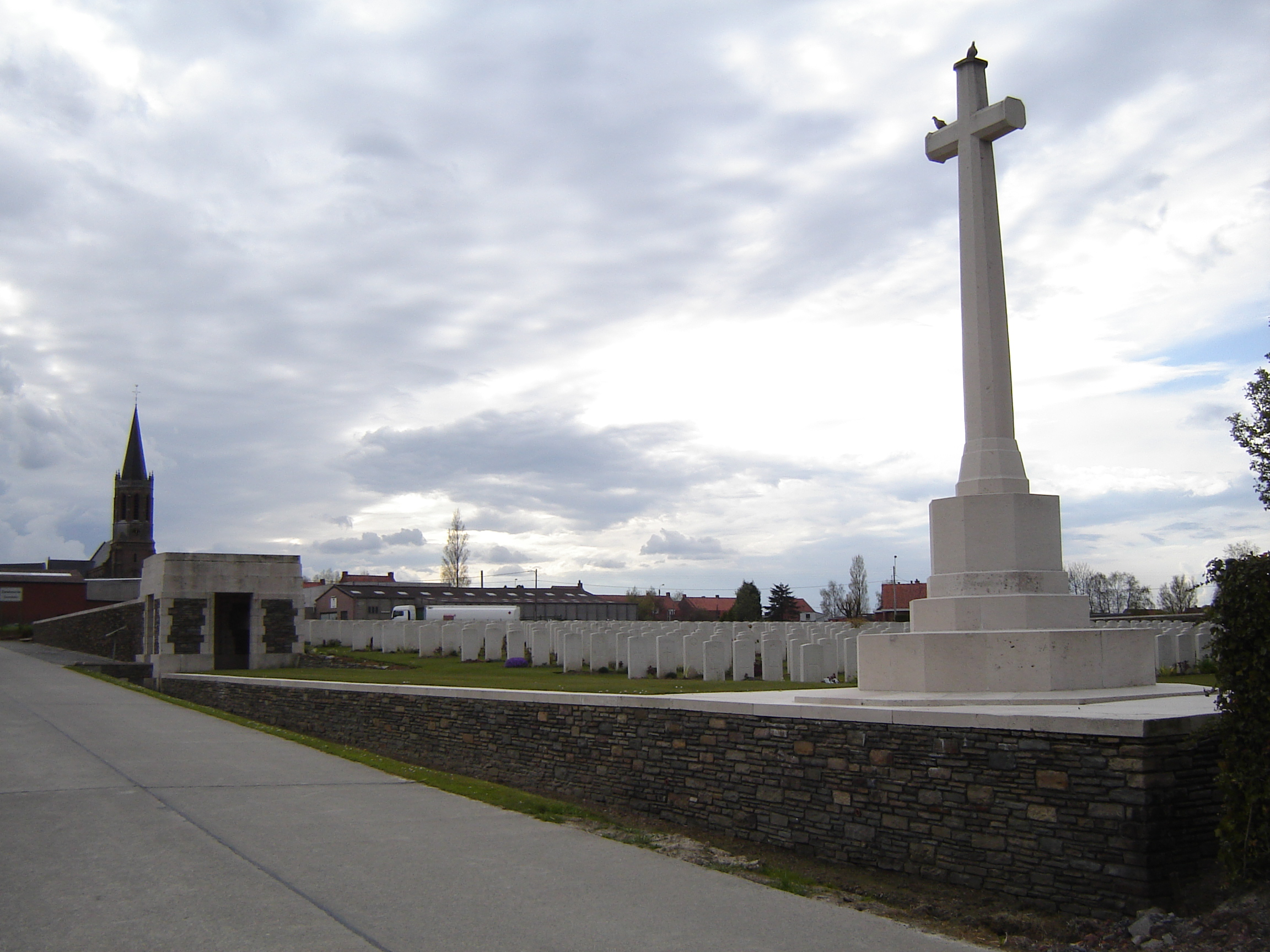
- Used for those deceased 1914–1918, 1941
- Established: Postwar
- Location: 50°48′49″N 02°58′59″E near Ypres, West Flanders, Belgium
- Designed by: Charles Holden
- Total burials: 1,584
- Unknowns: 1,135

Burials by nation
- Allied Powers: United Kingdom: 1,525; Canada: 22; Australia: 2; India: 1; Unknown 1,135

Burials by war
- First World War: 1,583 Second World War: 1

Zantvoorde British Cemetery is a Commonwealth War Graves Commission burial ground for the dead of the First World War located in the Ypres Salient in Belgium on the Western Front. It also contains the remains of a British airman killed during the Second World War.

== History ==
During the early stages of the First World War, the village of Zandvoorde, now known as Zantvoorde, and surrounding area was the scene of severe fighting. The village itself was defended by the Life Guards. The German forces captured it in late 30 October 1914 and buried the 350-odd British who had been killed there. The area remained under German control until late September 1918.

== Foundation ==
Zantevoorde British Cemetery was established after the First World War for the remains of soldiers killed in the area, mostly from 1914. It also contained bodies collected from several smaller cemeteries in the area. These included 138 British soldiers, most of whom were killed during late 1914, from the Kruiseeke German Cemetery, and Wervik German Cemetery.

== Cemetery ==
The cemetery, designed by the English architect Charles Holden and administered by the Commonwealth War Graves Commission, is located on the Kruisekestraat Road, to the east of Ypres. A Cross of Sacrifice is positioned in the southeast corner of the cemetery while a Stone of Remembrance is midway along the east wall. The cemetery also contains a memorial to 32 British soldiers originally buried in German military cemeteries but whose graves were unable to be located in the postwar period.

It holds the remains of 1,583 Allied soldiers who died during the First World War. Of these, 1,524 were British, 22 were from Canada, two from Australia and a sole Indian is interred in the cemetery. Most were buried by the Germans in the aftermath of the fighting in October 1914 and their identities were lost; 1,135 of them are recorded as being unknown. The cemetery also holds the remains of a British airman killed in 1941, during the Second World War.

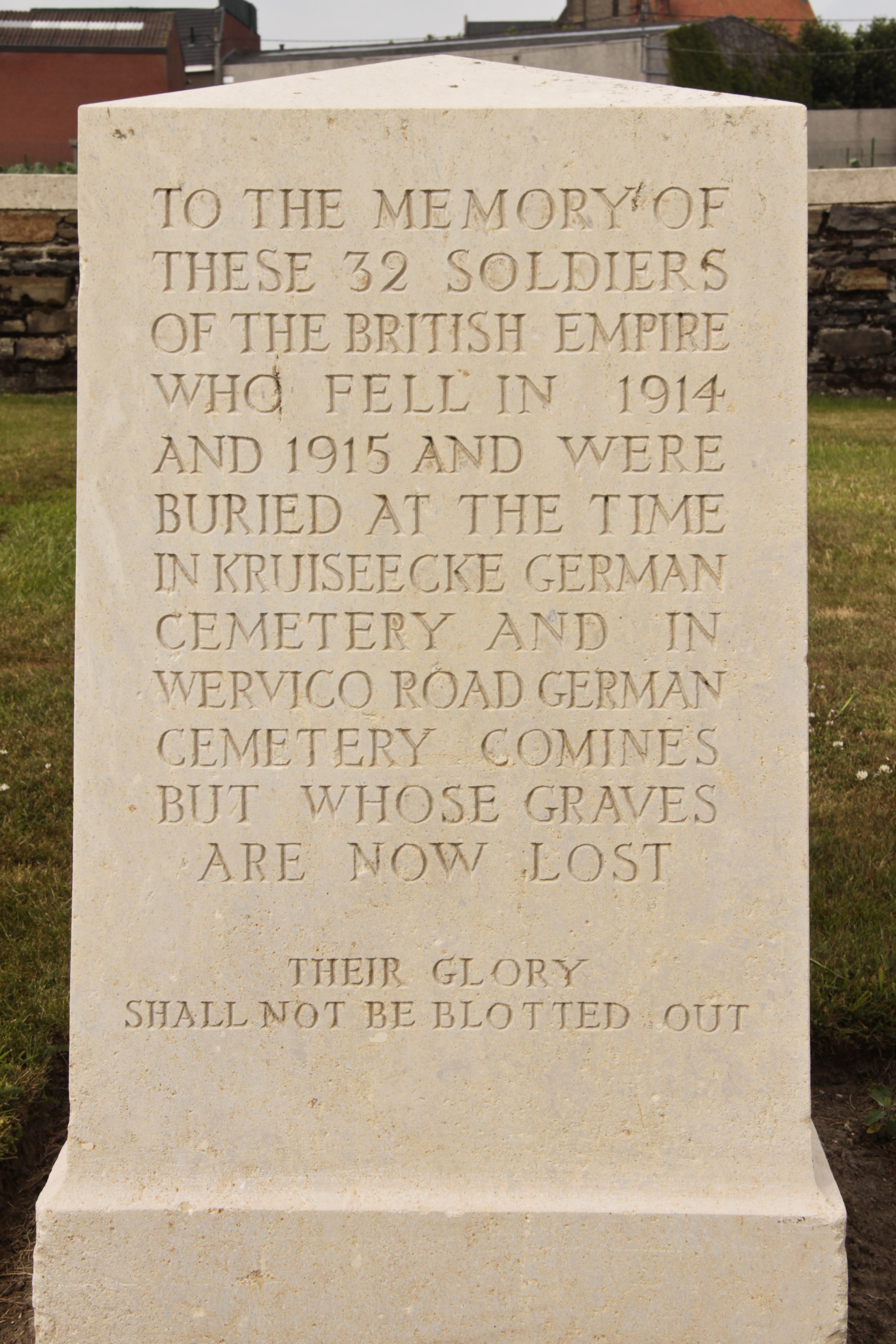
Memorial to 32 British soldiers whose burial sites elsewhere were unable to be found

Two Victoria Cross recipients are buried at the cemetery; James Brooke, killed on 29 October 1914, and Louis McGuffie, who died on 4 October 1918.
