= Margaret Wilson (Scottish martyr) =

Scottish Presbyterian executed 1685

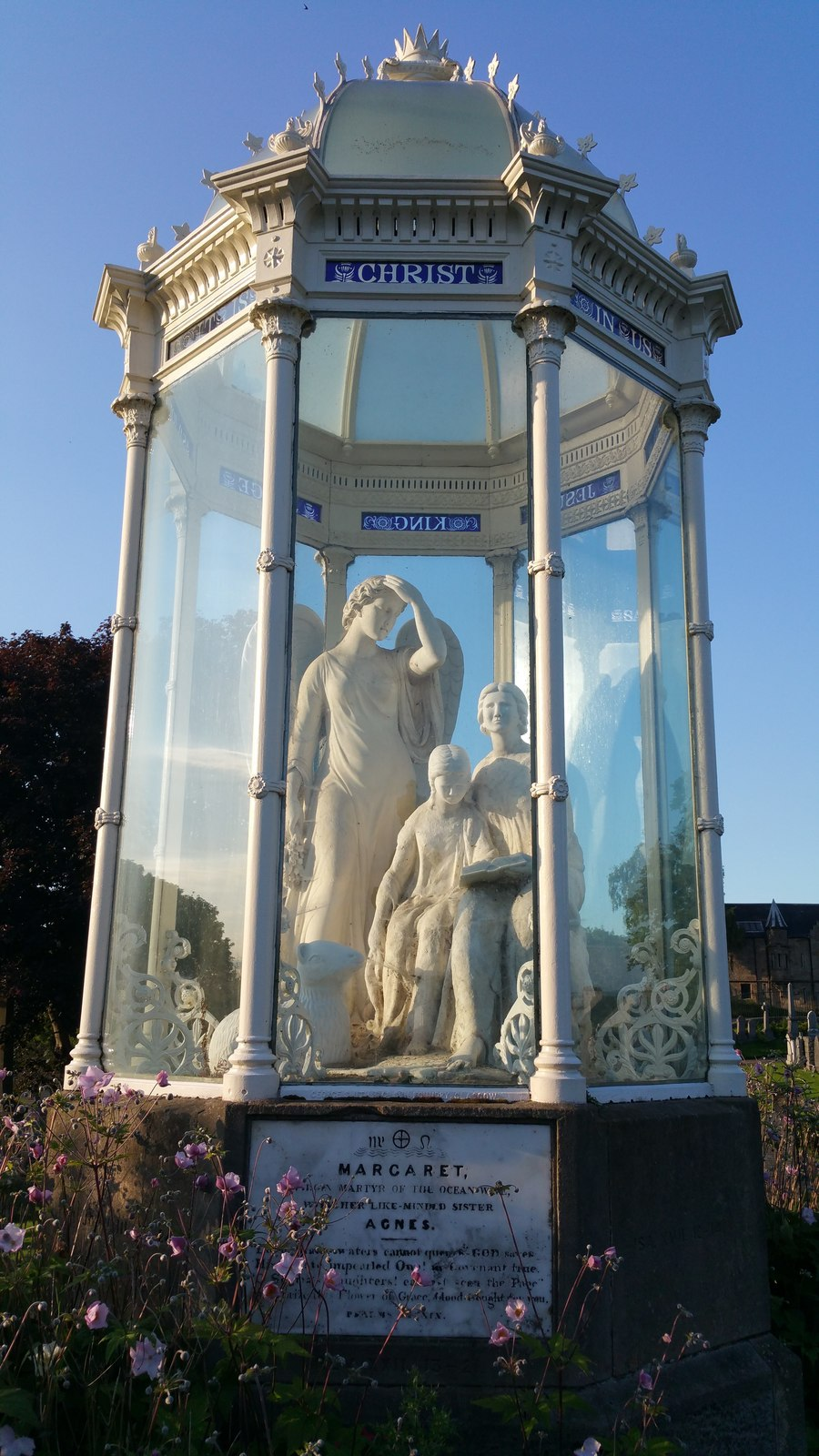
The Wigtown Martyrs Monument commissioned by the Drummonds in the Valley Cemetery, Stirling, depicts Margaret Wilson reading the Bible with her young sister Agnes, watched over by a despairing guardian angel.

Margaret Wilson (c. 1667 – 11 May 1685) was a young Scottish Covenanter from Wigtown in Scotland who was executed by drowning for refusing to abandon her support for the National Covenant. She died along with Margaret McLachlan. The two Margarets were known as the Wigtown Martyrs. Wilson became the more famous of the two because of her youth. As a teenager, her faith unto death became celebrated as part of the martyrology of Presbyterian churches.

== Background and arrest ==
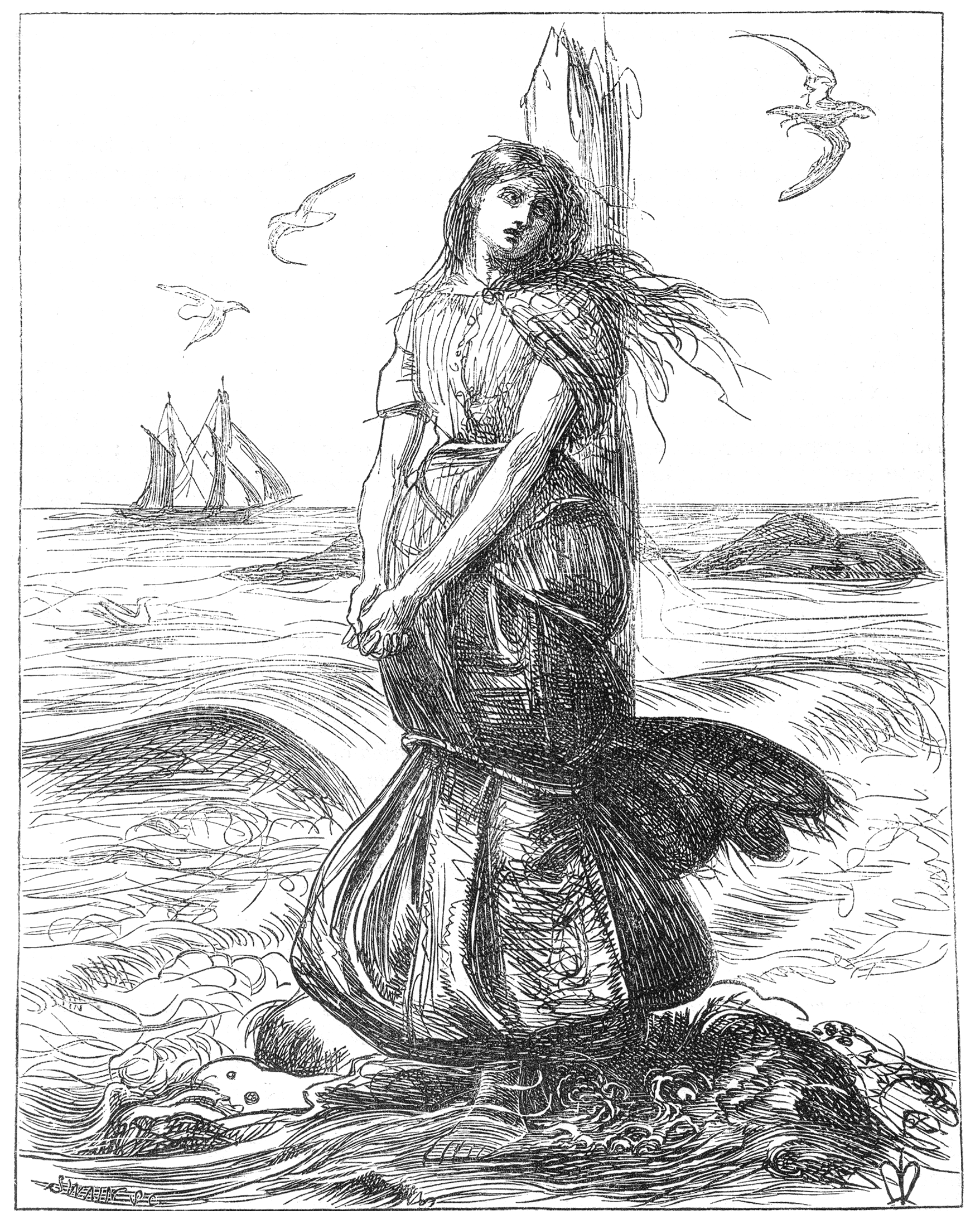
Millais' illustration of Wilson's martyrdom, published in Once A Week, July 1862

The Covenanter movement to maintain the reforms of the Scottish Reformation came to the fore with the signing of the National Covenant of 1638 in opposition to royal control of the church, promoting Presbyterianism as a form of church government instead of an Episcopal polity governed by bishops appointed by the Crown. The dispute led to the Wars of the Three Kingdoms and the overthrow of the monarchy. With the Restoration of the monarchy in 1660 the Covenants were declared treasonable and Episcopacy was restored. Particularly in the south-west of Scotland, ministers refused to submit. Barred from their churches, they held open air field assemblies called conventicles which the authorities suppressed using military force.

Margaret Wilson was born at Glenvernoch, a farm near Newton Stewart in Wigtownshire. Her parents were dutiful Episcopalians, but her older brothers were Covenanters. By 1684 Covenanters were hiding from the authorities in the hills, and increasingly draconian action had ended the large conventicles. There were still small gatherings held indoors, but now failure to take a test of allegiance to the king, which required renouncing the Covenant, was met with the death penalty, as did even attending a conventicle or harbouring Covenanters. Despite the risks, Margaret began attending conventicles with her younger brother Thomas, possibly beginning when there was an opportunity at a local conventicle to see the charismatic James Renwick who had newly become leader of the more extreme Covenanters known as the Cameronians. On occasion they also took along their young sister Agnes.

In February 1685 the sixteen-year-old Thomas Wilson left to join other Covenanters in the hills. The girls went on a secret visit to Wigtown to visit friends, including an elderly widow Margaret McLachlan (there are various spellings of her second name). The young sisters Margaret and Agnes were taken prisoner, possibly after declining to drink the King's health, and put into the "thieves' hole". They refused to take the Abjuration Oath renouncing the Covenant. On the following Sunday Margaret McLachlan was arrested, and also put into the "thieves' hole" with the Wilson girls, along with a servant woman. They were taken before the "local assizes" of the Government Commissioners for Wigtownshire.

On 13 April 1685 they were indicted as being guilty of the Rebellion of Bothwell Bridge, Aird's Moss, 20 Field Conventicles and 20 House Conventicles. The Assizes session took place and a guilty verdict was brought. The three main protagonists were found guilty on all charges, and sentenced to be "tied to palisades fixed in the sand, within the floodmark of the sea, and there to stand till the flood o'erflowed them".

== Privy Council of Scotland ==
The father of the girls, Gilbert Wilson, went to Edinburgh and made a plea to the Privy Council of Scotland for clemency for all three, presenting a petition which claimed that Margaret McLachlan had recanted. Agnes was granted freedom on a bond of 100 Pounds Scots, and "reprieves were written out for the two Margarets with a date of 30 April 1685".

== Reprieve and execution ==
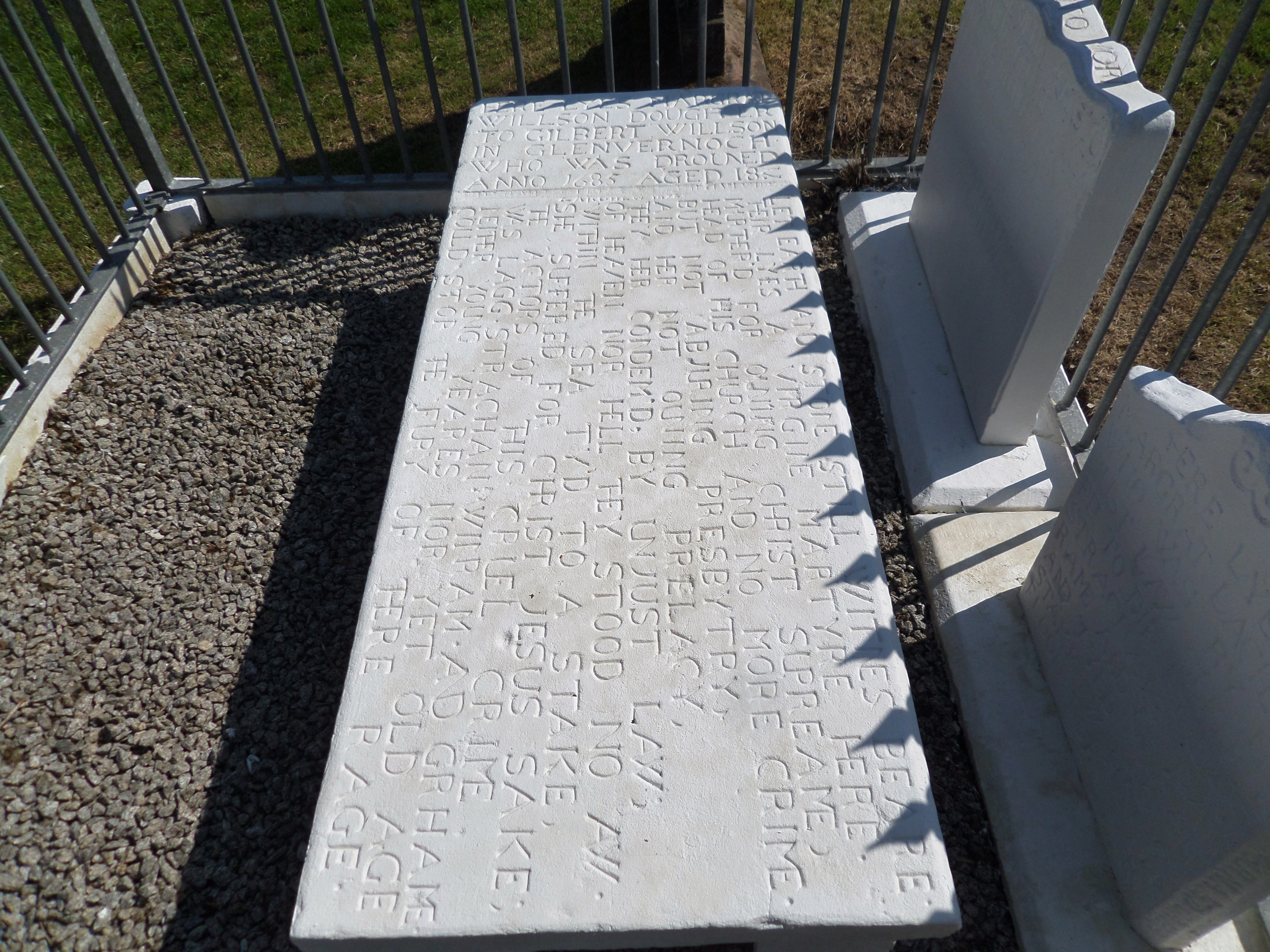
Martyrs' Grave, Wigtown parish church, Dumfries and Galloway, Scotland

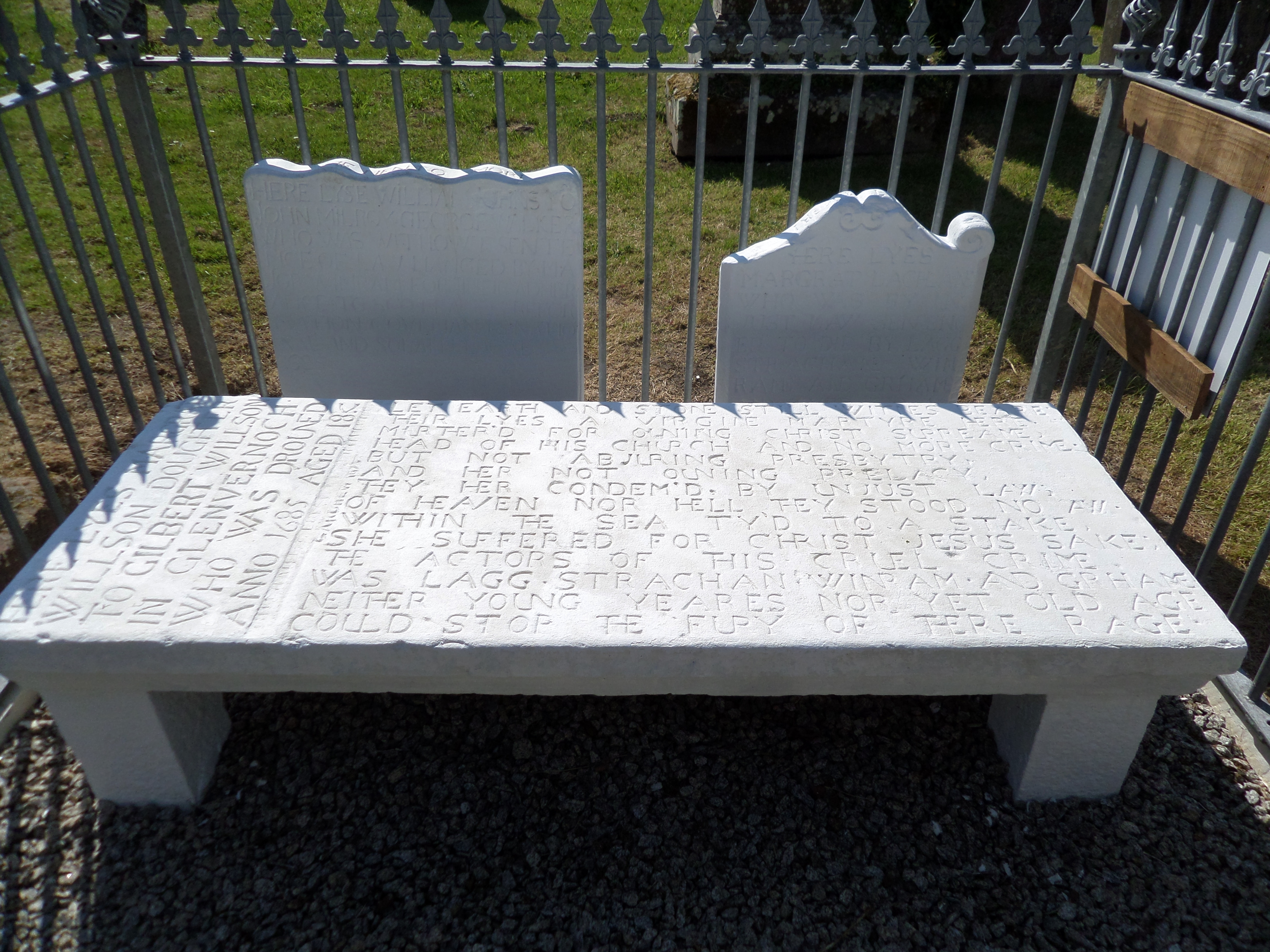
The Martyrs' Grave, Wigtown parish church, Dumfries and Galloway, Scotland

A reprieve was granted for Margaret Wilson and Margaret McLachlan. It stated, "The Lords of his Majesties Privy Council doe hereby reprove the execution of the sentence of death pronounced by the Justices against Margret Wilson and Margret Lauchlison until the ..... day of ..... and discharges the magistrats of Edinburgh for putting of the said sentence to execution against them until the forsaid day; and recommends the saids Margret Wilson and Margret Lauchlison to the "Lords Secretaries of State" to interpose with his most sacred Majestie for his Royall remission to them."

Urging that Margaret Wilson and Margaret McLachlan were officially reprieved by the Privy Council of Scotland, Mark Napier insisted that its agents should not have dared flout the Council's decree. Grierson of Lag, brother-in-law of Queensberry, nevertheless chose to do so. G. F. Crosbie writes that "over-zeal was no crime in 1685 – the year when Lag received his baronetcy in the pitiless James's coronation honour's list."

On 11 May 1685, 11 days after the signing of the reprieve, Margaret Wilson and Margaret McLachlan were chained to stakes on the Solway Firth. Just prior to her death, Margaret Wilson was permitted to pray for the King, but she would not renounce the covenant. This did not satisfy her accusers. Onlookers reported that she quoted from the psalms and the epistles and sang until she drowned. Robert Wodrow later wrote that the killers should have been prosecuted for ignoring the reprieve. Margaret Wilson was buried, together with her friend Margaret McLachlan, in the churchyard of Wigtown.

== Witness statements ==
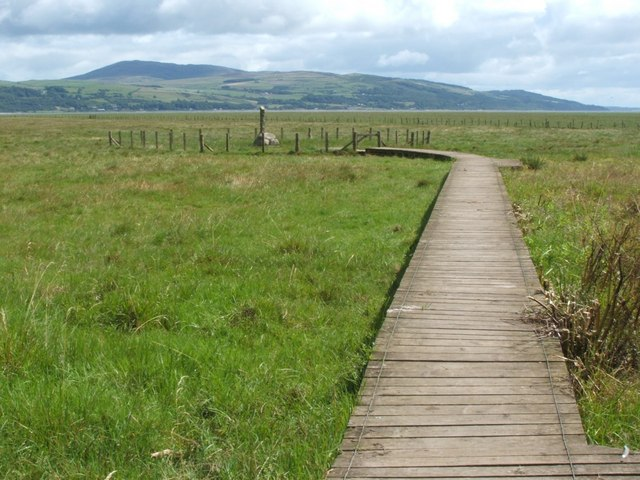
Approach to the Martyrs' Stake

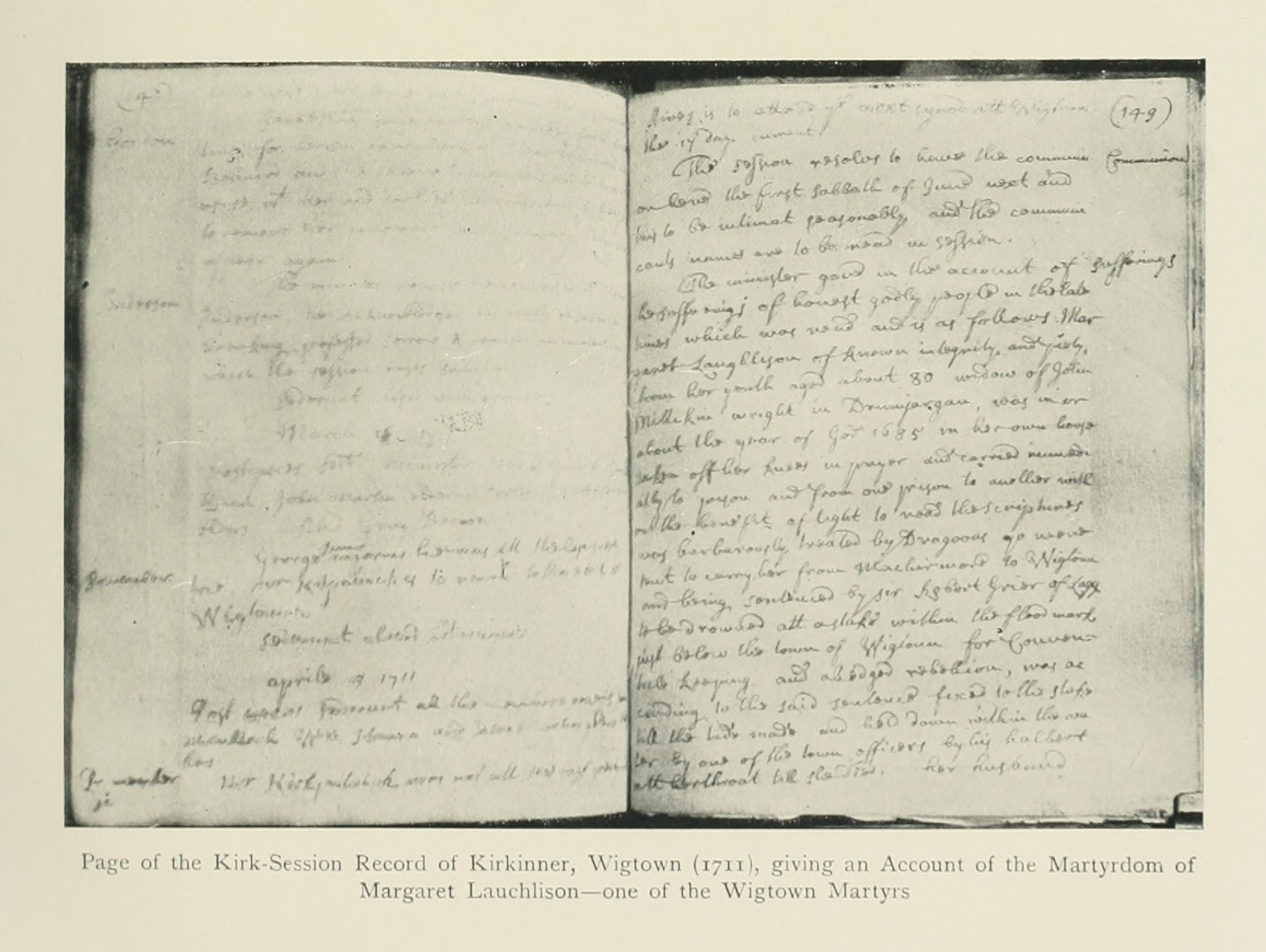
Kirkinner Kirk Session record

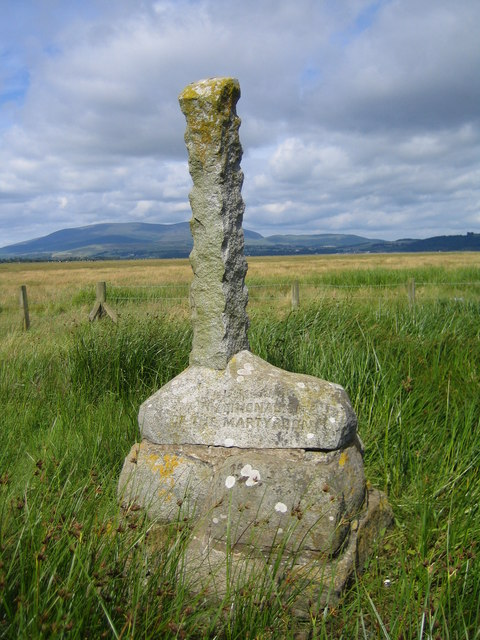
Martyrs' Memorial Wigtown

Twenty years after the date of the execution, Kirkinner and Penninghame Kirk Session prepared two accounts that drew on stories collected from individuals who claimed to have witnessed the events: McLachlan's daughter's own account about the drowning of her mother was employed, and the records of the Penninghame Kirk Session included a statement referring to Wilson's brother Thomas, that he "lives to certifie the truth of these things, with many others who knew them too weel."

The story of the Wigtown Martyrs was among those collected by Robert Wodrow and published in his History of the Sufferings of the Church of Scotland from the Restoration to the Revolution. The Church of Scotland synod had decided in the year of the attempted Jacobite invasion, 1708, to collect accounts of persecution under the Stuart monarchs, and commissioned Wodrow to take on the research. He wrote that Thomas Wilson "lives now in his father's room, and is ready to attest all I am writing." The account was published in 1721, and had a considerable effect on public perception despite being attacked by royalists and supporters of the Scottish Episcopal Church.

Scottish lawyer and historian Mark Napier in his three-volume Memorials of Graham of Claverhouse, Viscount Dundee, 1859–62, included letters of Claverhouse and other documents not previously in print. Its publication led to a small storm of controversy about the supposed drowning of the "Wigtown Martyrs". Napier raised doubts as to whether the executions as depicted ever took place, and critiqued the writings of Robert Wodrow and his defenders. Napier replied in detail to his objectors in the Case for the Crown in re the Wigtown Martyrs proved to be Myths versus Wodrow and Lord Macaulay, Patrick the Pedlar and Principal Tulloch, 1863; and once more in History Rescued, in Reply to History Vindicated (by the Rev. Archibald Stewart), 1870.

== Art and literature ==
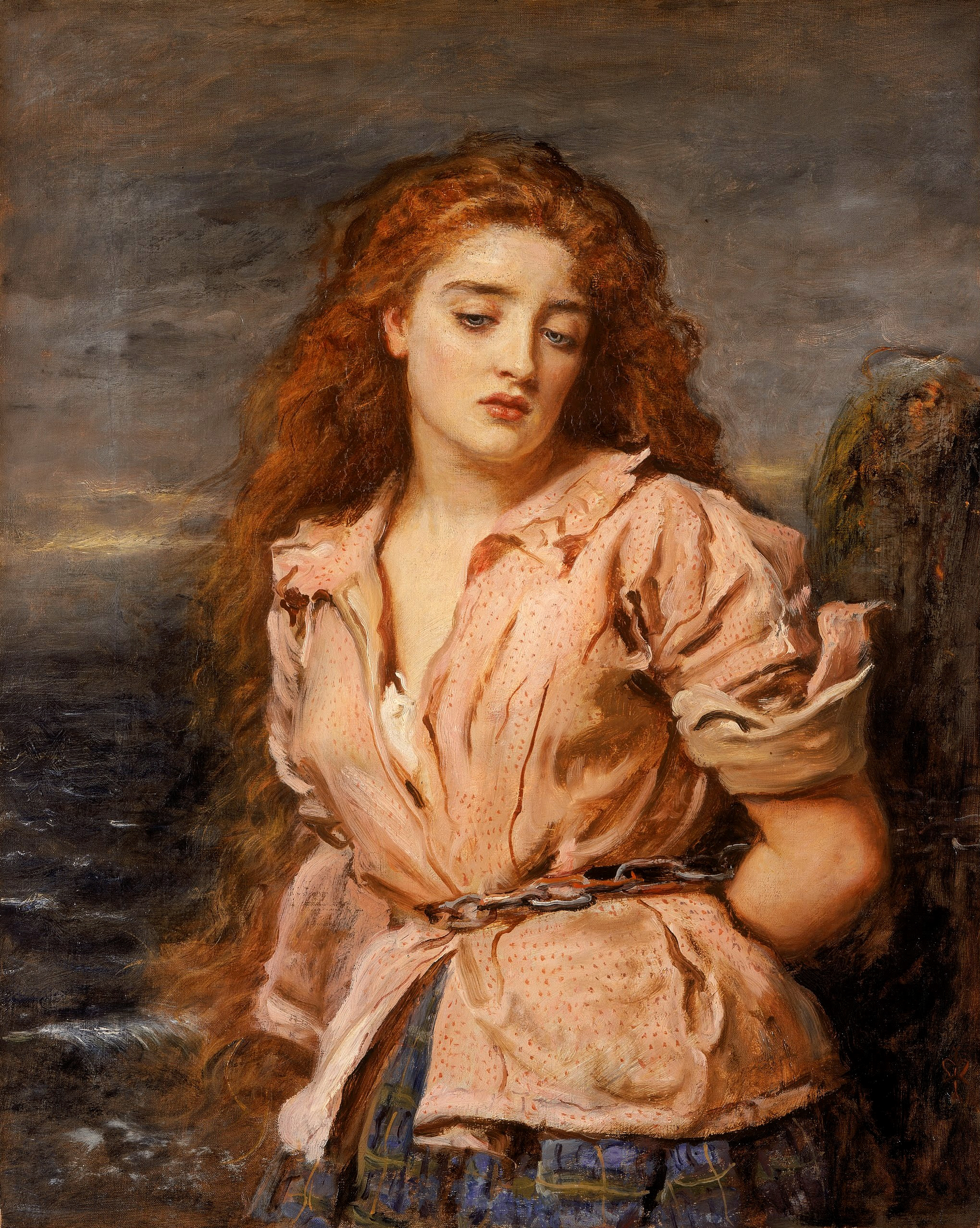
Painting of Margaret Wilson, The Martyr of the Solway, by John Everett Millais, 1871.
Walker Art Gallery, Liverpool.

The death of Margaret Wilson was depicted in 1862 by the Pre-Raphaelite artist John Everett Millais in an illustration for the magazine Once A Week. The magazine also reproduced the verses describing her death which are inscribed on her grave in Wigtown.

The story of Wilson's death is discussed in Josephine Tey's 1951 novel The Daughter of Time, in which a modern detective criticises versions of historical events created to serve political agendas. Following Mark Napier, Tey portrays the death of Wilson as a myth, referring to the existence of the reprieve, held by the Scottish Privy Council "to this day". She claims that "the original collector of the material, canvassing the Wigtown district only forty years after the supposed martyrdom and at the height of the Presbyterian triumph, complains that 'many deny that this happened'; and couldn't find any eyewitnesses at all". In fact, Robert Wodrow, the original collector of the material published in The History and Sufferings of the Church 36 years after the event, wrote that "our jacobites have the impudence, some of them to deny, and others to extenuate this matter of fact which can be fully evinced by many living witnesses." Kirk Session records written out twenty years after the events provide detailed accounts compiled from the narratives of individuals who claimed to have witnessed the events. A Victorian statue of Margaret Wilson's martyrdom is on display at Knox College in the University of Toronto, Canada.

== See also ==
- Barbara Gilmour – fellow Scottish Covenanter
- Solway Firth
