= Wigtown Martyrs =

Scottish Covenanters killed in 1685

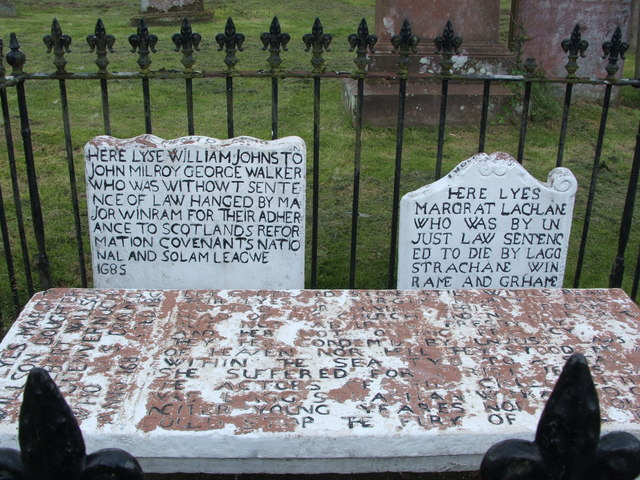
Covenanters' Graves

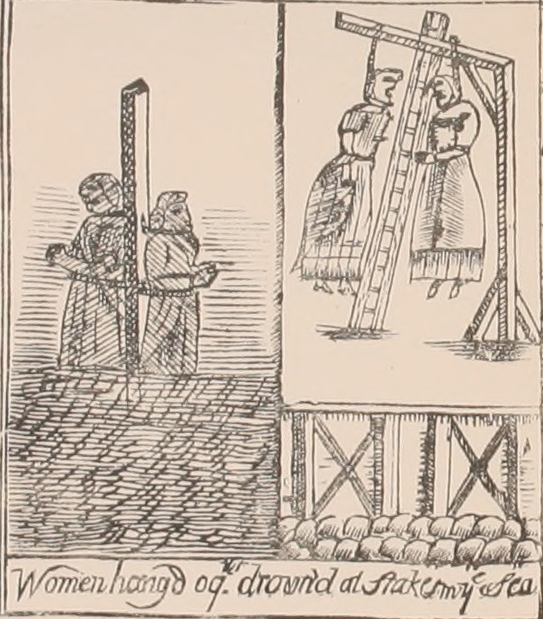
Tortures shown in panel from A Cloud of Witnesses, first published in 1714.

The Wigtown Martyrs or Solway Martyrs, Margaret Maclauchlan and Margaret Wilson, were Scottish Covenanters who were executed by Scottish Episcopalians on 11 May, 1685 in Wigtown, Scotland, for refusing to swear the Oath of Supremacy declaring James VII of Scotland as head of the church. They were tied to stakes on the town's mudflats and allowed to drown with the rising tide.

Monuments to the 'Wigtown Martyrs' exist in Wigtown. During "The Killing Times" of the Covenanters in the 17th century, Margaret McLachlan, an elderly woman of around 63, and Margaret Wilson, around 18 years of age, were sentenced to be tied to stakes in the tidal channel of the River Bladnoch near its entrance to Wigtown Bay to be drowned by the incoming tide. The ploy was that the younger woman might be persuaded to change her mind after watching the older woman drown. The strategy failed and both died. This execution was carried out by dragoons under the command of Major Windram in the presence of Sir Robert Grierson of Lag who held the King's Commission to suppress the rebels in the South West. Their story, as told in various sources, tells how the women were betrayed by an informer. After about a month in prison they were tried as rebels and sentenced to death by drowning. The story of the Wigtown Martyrs was among those collected by Robert Wodrow and published in his History of the Sufferings of the Church of Scotland from the Restoration to the Revolution. The Church of Scotland synod had decided in 1708 to collect accounts of persecution under the Stuart monarchs, and persuaded Wodrow to take on the research. He wrote that Thomas Wilson "lives now in his father's room, and is ready to attest all I am writing."

There are two graves to the women in the local churchyard and on nearby Windy Hill there is a memorial obelisk. There is also a stone at the point where they died.

== Controversy ==
Historian Mark Napier's Memorials of Graham of Claverhouse, Viscount Dundee, 1859–62, included letters of Claverhouse and other documents not previously available in print. The publication stirred up acrimonious controversy related to the two Covenanter women, because Napier raised doubts as to whether the two women's execution ever took place at all. He replied to his critics in the Case for the Crown in re the Wigtown Martyrs proved to be Myths versus Wodrow and Lord Macaulay, Patrick the Pedlar and Principal Tulloch, 1863; and in History Rescued, in Reply to History Vindicated (by the Rev. Archibald Stewart), 1870.
