= Machars =

Peninsula in the south-west of Scotland

Coordinates: 54.82°N 4.64°W

The Machars Machair Ghallghaidhealaibh (Scottish Gaelic)
- Peninsula
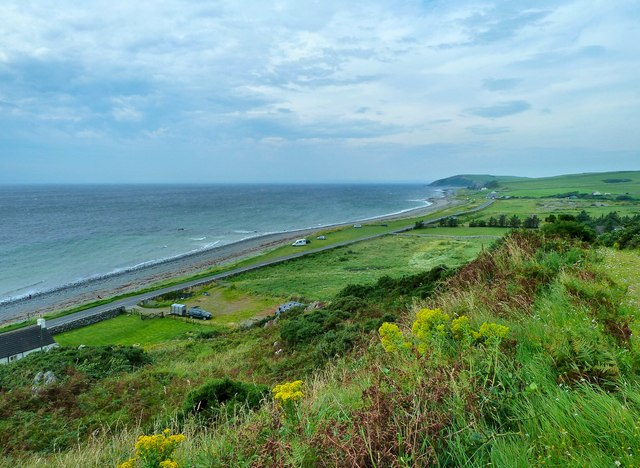
- Luce Bay coastline of The Machars, south of Auchenmalg

- Location within Scotland
- Location: Wigtownshire, Dumfries & Galloway
- Highest elevation: 197 m (646 ft) (Mochrum Fell)

The Machars (Scottish Gaelic: Machair Ghallghaidhealaibh) is a peninsula in the historical county of Wigtownshire in Galloway in the south-west of Scotland. Its name (in Scots and English) is derived from the Gaelic word Machair meaning low-lying or level land, known as "links" on the east coast of Scotland. Although there are no high peaks in The Machars, the area is not flat and would best be described as undulating or rolling. The North Atlantic Drift or Gulf Stream creates a mild climate, and dolphins and basking sharks are frequently seen in the seas.

== Geography ==
The Machars peninsula is roughly defined by a northern boundary stretching from Newton Stewart to Glenluce, the only other boundary being the sea. The 40-mile (64 km) coastline has enormous variety, starting with the mud-flats of Wigtown on the east facing Wigtown Bay, down to the sandy beach at Rigg Bay in Garlieston (where the Mulberry Harbours were developed). The coastline then rises to form dramatic cliffs as it passes the ruins of Cruggleton Castle, dropping a little at Portyerrock Bay and the Isle of Whithorn, and rising again at Burrow Head (where the climax of classic cult film The Wicker Man was filmed).

Past the southern tip of the peninsula, the shoreline leaves Wigtown Bay and becomes part of Luce Bay. The cliffs continue as far as the beautiful sandy beach at Monreith ( childhood home of the author Gavin Maxwell), and on past Port William. A combination of rocky shoreline, sandy beaches and cliffs continues as far as Auchenmalg and Stairhaven before the sandy dunes approaching Glenluce. Two rivers cut through the peninsula, the River Bladnoch which rises at Loch Maberry and meets the sea just south of Wigtown, and one of its major tributaries the Tarf Water which meets the Bladnoch near Kirkcowan. Another tributary of the Bladnoch is the large stream the Water of Malzie which rises in the large expanses of peat bog near the Old Place of Mochrum before meeting the Bladnoch near Cormalzie.

Generally speaking the Eastern half of the Machars can be described as being a landscape of rolling green hills and scattered woodland which forms a perfect setting for the large scale dairy industry which can be found here. In fact up until recent decades a large scale creamery was to be found at Sorbie although this has now closed. This landscape extends to the far southern extremities of the peninsula, however the landscape to the North West is significantly different, where above the raised beaches of Luce Bay a rugged expanse of moorland and bog can be found, more reminiscent of the rough country to the north. The highest point of the Machars can be found here, Mochrum Fell, however for the most part the terrain can be characterised as a series of low, stony ridges interspersed by large expanses of peat bog and moorland and many small lochs. This part of the Machars is generally associated with large scale forestry plantations, especially of Sitka Spruce, and stock-rearing, either the hardy Belted Galloway or more typically Galloway cattle or sheep.

The other principal settlements on the peninsula are: Kirkcowan, Whithorn, Isle of Whithorn, Kirkinner, Sorbie, Mochrum, Elrig, Bladnoch and Whauphill.

There are a number of large lochs in the area including Mochrum Loch, Castle Loch and the White Loch of Myrton.

== History ==
The area is rich in prehistoric remains, mainly in the form of standing stones and cup and ring marks. The most notable of these are Torhousekie stone circle and Drumtroddan standing stones. In Castle Loch near The Old Place of Mochrum are the remains of several crannogs.

Burrow Head (the southernmost tip of the peninsula) is about 18 miles (29 kilometres) from Point of Ayre on the Isle of Man, and trade links have long existed between the two places, much of which involved smuggling.

The primary industry in the area was agriculture, though today the tourist industry probably employs more people and generates more income.

=== Saint Ninian ===
Saint Ninian first brought Christianity to what-would-become Scotland via the Machars, founding a small church at the Isle of Whithorn from which a mediæval cathedral later sprang at Whithorn. Ninian studied under St Martin of Tours and can lay claim to bringing Christianity to Scotland long before St Columba, whose church at Iona is often mistakenly credited as the cradle of Scottish Christianity.

=== RAF Wigtown ===
The Machars is also home to the former RAF Wigtown. The airfield, which was opened in 1941 and is often referred to as Baldoon, was used in World War II as a training school - hosting the No 1 Air Observers School from September 13, 1941, to February 1, 1942, and operating in conjunction with a tracked target range near the coast to the southeast. Although the site originally consisted of grass runways, flooding of the land soon caused these to become unusable, and two concrete runways were installed during 1942. Operations at the airfield ceased in 1945, to coincide with the end of the war, and control of the site was given over to Maintenance Command which was placed in care and maintenance, transferring to No 14 Maintenance Unit from July 1, 1946, to March 1, 1948, when the airfield was finally closed.

Despite considerable deterioration much of the airfield remains intact; with the original control tower still standing and nearly all the perimeter and access roads remaining. Furthermore, the concrete bases of many of the hangars and other buildings can still be seen on the ground. Today much of the land has reverted to agricultural use, with the site becoming popular for locals to conduct leisure activities – such as walking or cycling.

== Gallery ==
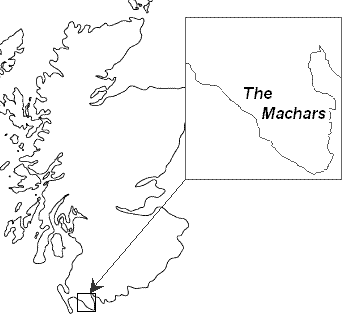
The location of The Machars in Scotland.

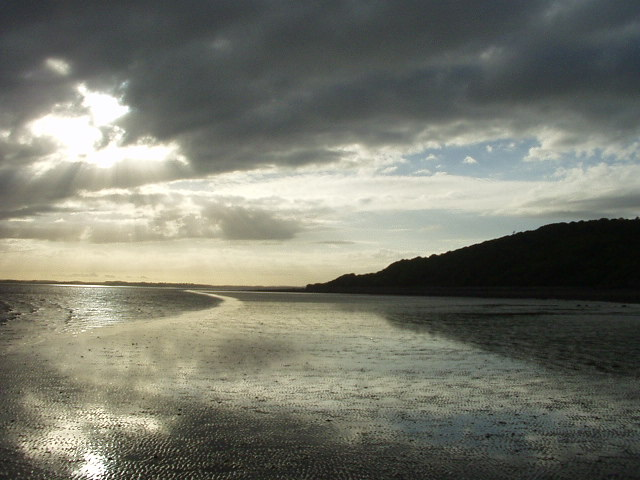
A Machars beach at Wigtown.

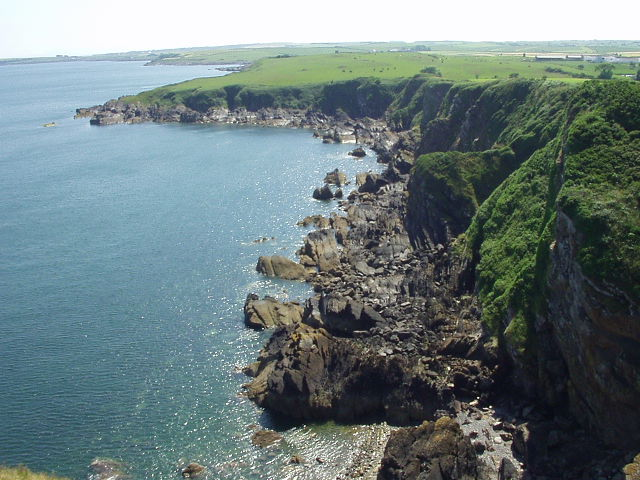
Machars Coastline looking south from Cruggleton Castle.

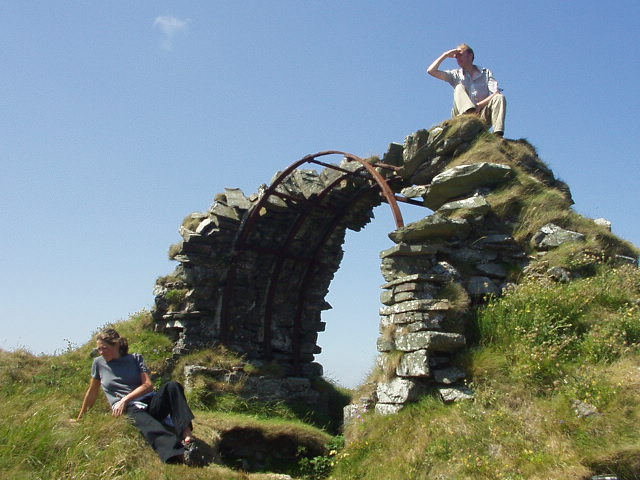
The remains of Cruggleton Castle.

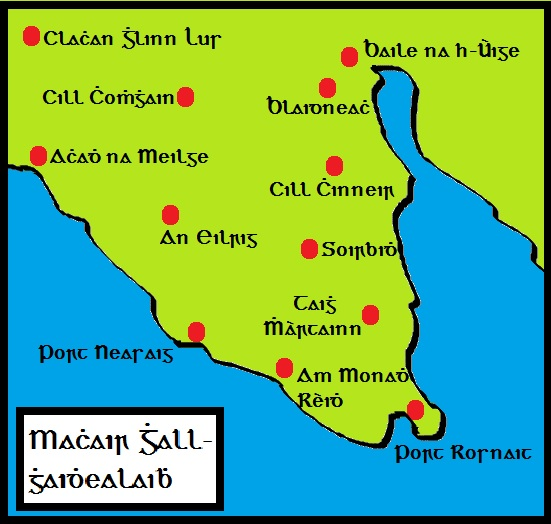
Map of the Machars with Scottish Gaelic placenames.

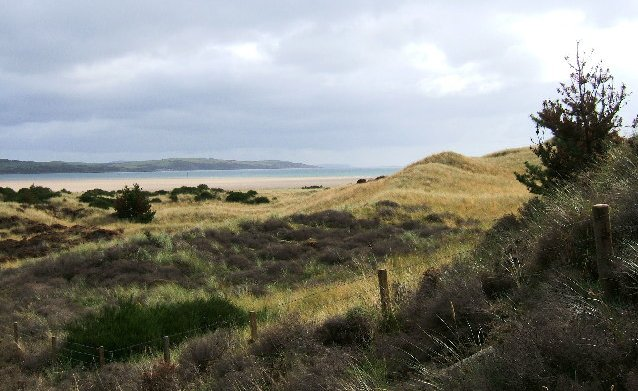
The Machars, as viewed from Torrs Warren with Luce Bay standing between.

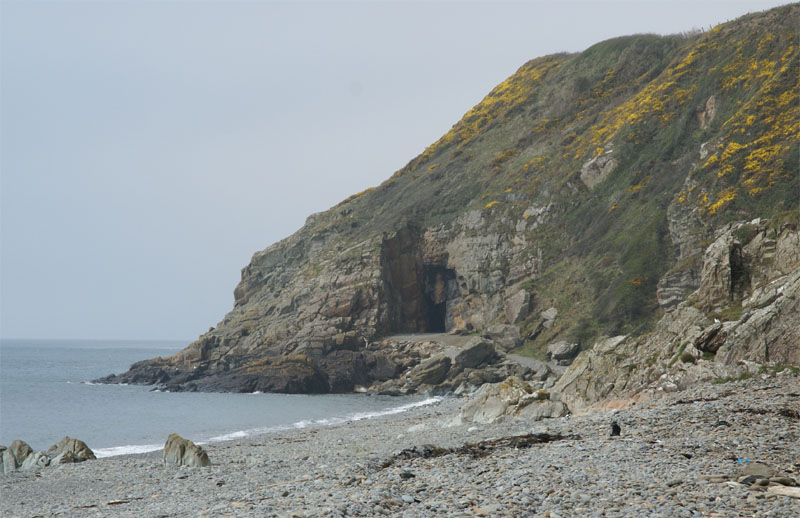
St Ninian's Cave, Physgill
