= Isle of Whithorn =

Coordinates: 54.697°N 4.360°W

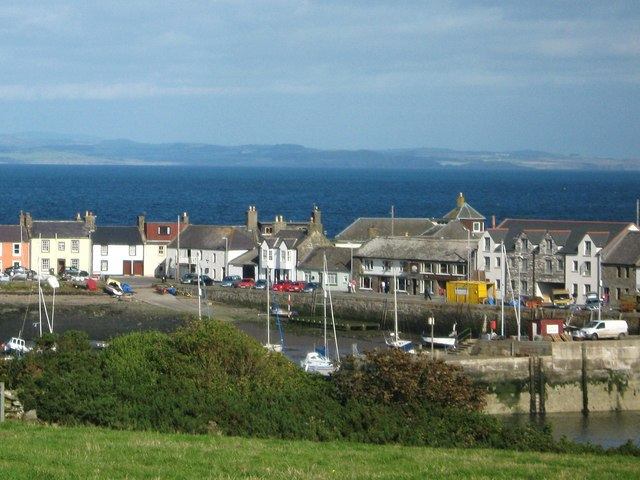

- Location within Dumfries and Galloway
- Population: 300 (2001 Census)
- OS grid reference: NX479273
- Council area: Dumfries and Galloway
- Lieutenancy area: Wigtown
- Country: Scotland
- Sovereign state: United Kingdom
- Post town: NEWTON STEWART
- Postcode district: DG8
- Dialling code: 01988
- Police: Scotland
- Fire: Scottish
- Ambulance: Scottish
- UK Parliament: Dumfries and Galloway
- Scottish Parliament: Galloway and West Dumfries

Isle of Whithorn (Port Rosnait in Gaelic) is one of the most southerly villages and seaports in Scotland, lying on the coast north east of Burrow Head, about three miles from Whithorn and about thirteen miles south of Wigtown in Dumfries and Galloway. Whithorn, (Taigh Mhàrtainn in Gaelic), is a former royal burgh in Wigtownshire, Dumfries and Galloway, with which Isle of Whithorn is frequently incorrectly amalgamated or confused. It is referred to locally as 'The Isle' - never 'the Isle of Whithorn'.

The village is the location of the long ruined 13th-century Saint Ninian's Chapel, previously a chapel linked to Whithorn Priory and a stopping off point for pilgrims landing on Isle Head and making their way to Whithorn. Although no longer a true island, John Ainslie's maps as late as 1782 and 1821 show the Isle as an island. The main street was originally a causeway, with the harbour located on what was then the true Isle.

The Isle has a long history of habitation: for example, a survey of the ground between the Isle village and Saint Ninian's Chapel revealed clearance cairns and cultivation furrows, as well as the remains of a rectangular building occupying the crest of the low hill immediately to the west of the chapel, with possible steps leading downhill towards the east.

== Community and amenities ==
A Community Council represents the village and a Church of Scotland church, previously a Free Kirk, sits on the old boatyard, a site extending into the harbour and threatened at exceptionally high tides. There are a bowling club, a basic football pitch and two play areas for the young. The village hall is well used: in August 2008, the community took over management control of this facility and it is now completely refurbished and home to Scotland's most southerly cinema, 'Machars Movies'. Following a substantial award from the Big Lottery Fund, a new tearoom, post office and shop selling gifts and foodstuffs, 'Saint Ninian's', was built alongside the hall, and this opened in October 2014.

The village has one pub, the Steam Packet Inn. A second pub, the Queen's Arms, was closed some years ago and now houses an art gallery and craft shop. Also on the harbour there is a fish shop and general store called Isle Sea Foods; upstairs are a launderette, a toilet and shower facilities. The old village school is now a private house, overlooking the Stinking Port, the bay on the other side of the Isle promontory. A granite war memorial is at the north end of the village just off Main Street, on a mound overlooking the bowling green, with twelve First World War names on it and five Second World War names. The regiments and ships are given for the First World War only.

Fishing is widely available on the lochs, local rivers Bladnoch and Cree, and on the sea itself by boat or from the shore. There are numerous trails and quiet roads for walking, horse riding or cycling. Signposted by the Whithorn Pilgrimage Trust, the Pilgrim's Way follows a route southwards from the Southern Upland Way through the Machars, passing through New Luce and the early Christian holy sites of Glenluce Abbey, the White Loch, Whithorn, Isle of Whithorn and St Ninian's Cave. The main part of the route from Glenluce to Whithorn is 25 miles (40 km) long.

== History ==
Pliny the Elder died in AD 79 and in his Natural History he describes Britain, Ireland and the smaller islands off the coast, one being vectis and this has been identified with the Isle of Whithorn. The name Lucopibia as used by Ptolemy has also been linked with Whithorn.

This was a haunt for smugglers and a principal harbour for legitimate trade and transport; here you caught the Countess of Galloway, the steam packet which would take you to Liverpool and maybe a passage on an emigrant ship to the New World or Australia.

== Isle Castle ==
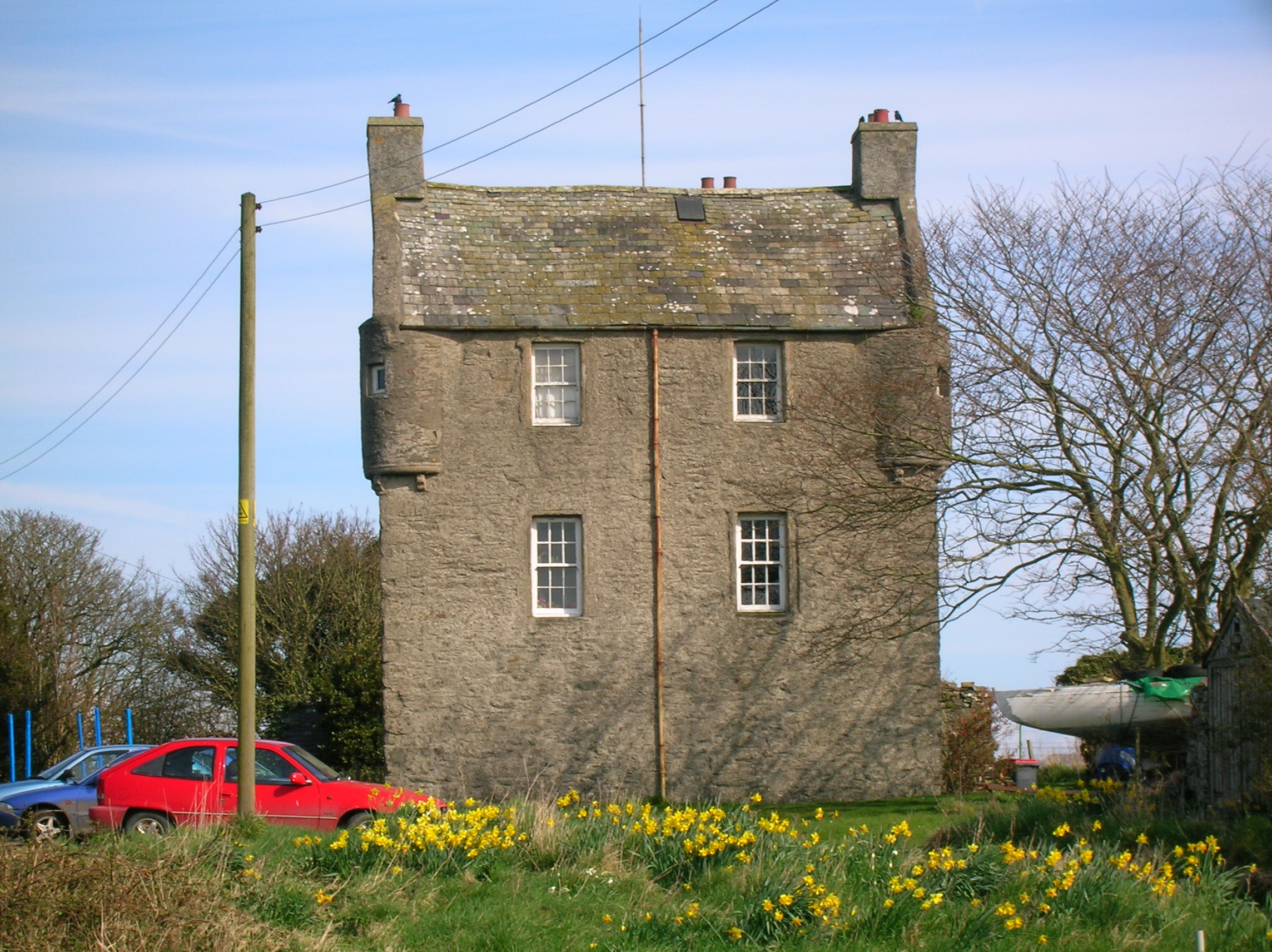
Isle of Whithorn Castle

The Isle Castle is one of the village's oldest buildings. The building is comparatively small and is nearly square in plan, although the principle of an L-shaped arrangement is retained. In the early 19th century it was the residence of the Superintendent of the Coastguard, Sir John Reid. The 'Captain's Garden' is an extension into the harbour, now with several houses on it, but originally a garden associated with the castle. Still called the Captain's Garden it is decorated with simulated man o' war gun ports.

Above the door of these quarters is a stone with the initials of Patrick Houston of Drummaston and his wife Margaret Gordon, together with the likely date of construction, 1674. This stone has been moved from the old entrance door of the main building. The angle turrets on the second floor are carried on three plain corbels and do not show at all in the inside of the building. A Gothic-style porch was once attached to the Drumelan burn side of the castle.

The Bysbie corn mill was located on the other side of the Drummulin Burn from the castle and a sizeable mill pond and sluice supplied the water power; the mill remains lie behind the Queen's Arms Hotel. A chalybeate 'Spa Well' was located below the castle as shown by the 1850s 6 inch to the mile OS map.

== St Ninian's Chapel ==
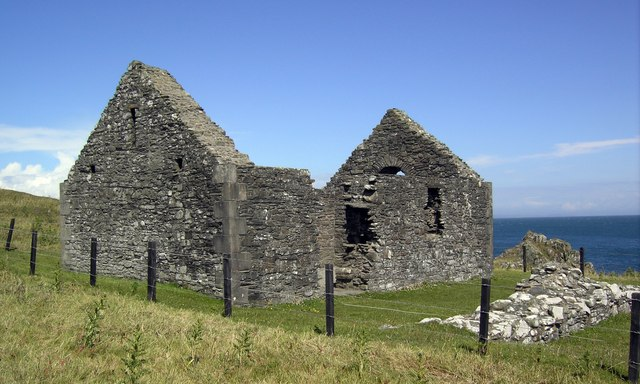
St. Ninian's Chapel

The chapel was repaired and partly rebuilt in 1898 by the Marquess of Bute; its main features were preserved. The present ruins are rectangular, measuring internally 31' × 16' 6" (9.4 m × 5.0 m). This building was probably erected to replace a 12th to early 13th century chapel, whose foundations were found during excavations and consisted of a nave, 17' 6" × 16' 6" (5.3 m × 5.0 m) with a square chancel. The chapel stood within a contemporary enclosure wall, part of which is still standing. An outer enclosure may have once existed, best seen in oblique sunlight, defining a roughly oval area 100' × 110' (30 m × 34 m). This outer enclosure may be of the Celtic period. There are no records of the chapel's use as a burial ground.

St Ninian is chiefly remembered at Whithorn. However, many places in Scotland are associated with his name, such as Saint Ninian's Isle in the River Garnock near Kilwinning. He converted the Southern Picts and therefore journeyed throughout many areas in southern Scotland.

== The Cairn ==
The Isle's most familiar landmark is the square, white tower known locally as 'The Cairn', that has been a navigational aid for hundreds of years.

From here there are views of the Kirkcudbright coast, the whole of the northern range of the English Lake District mountains, and to the south the rounded, mountainous form of the Isle of Man.

During the Second World War it was the site of a tracking station for anti-aircraft gunnery practice. The set-up was that an aircraft flew up and down in front of the guns, which would try to bring it down. Initially, radio-controlled 'Queen Bee' aircraft were used, and the flat concrete foundation by the white tower on the cairn, now the location of the Solway Harvester memorial stone, was laid down for one of the control huts. The memorial stone to the Solway Harvester is in the form of an anchor set in a granite block.

== Isle Head ==
This promontory is nearly bisected by Chapel Port east and west. The artificial ditch of the Old Fort is still clearly visible on the approach to Isle Head.

There is a multivallate promontory fort on Isle Head, consisting of three ramparts and two ditches, with a probable fourth rampart now reduced to a slight scarp. On the seaward side of the promontory are intermittent stretches of rubble linking and using natural outcrops of rock; in the south-east corner are inner and outer faces, indicating the footings of a wall up to 3 yards wide. On the levelled summit area are slight indications of rubble walling and artificial scarping on the south and east sides; and in the north-east corner are the possible remains of a hut circle.

A small block of rig is clearly visible on Isle Head, lying between the path leading to the promontory and the ramparts and ditch of the Iron Age fort. The furrows are orientated from NE to SW across the promontory.

A witness cairn was erected in 1997 to commemorate the arrival of the Christian missionary St. Ninian to these shores, and pilgrims are encouraged to place stones with personal messages onto a rock cairn. These cairns are sited in the remains of a building used to house the Isle of Whithorn lifeboat.

The lifeboat building had a roof until well after the Second World War, although the station was closed in 1919, when a motor lifeboat was placed on station at Kirkcudbright. The Lifeboat Station was set up in 1869. During the 50 years that the lifeboat station was operating there were three lifeboats:

- Charlie Peake (1869–1886), 7 launches and 10 lives saved
- Henry and John Leighton (1886–1901), 12 launches and 22 lives saved.
- George and Margaret (1901–1919), six launches and six lives saved.

The Solway Harvester Seat is a granite-hewn bench and is one of two local tributes to the seven-strong local crew of the fishing boat Solway Harvester which sank in a storm off the Isle of Man in January 2000. The other, an anchor set in a stone inscribed with the vessel's name, sits atop the nearby hill next to The Cairn.

== The harbour ==
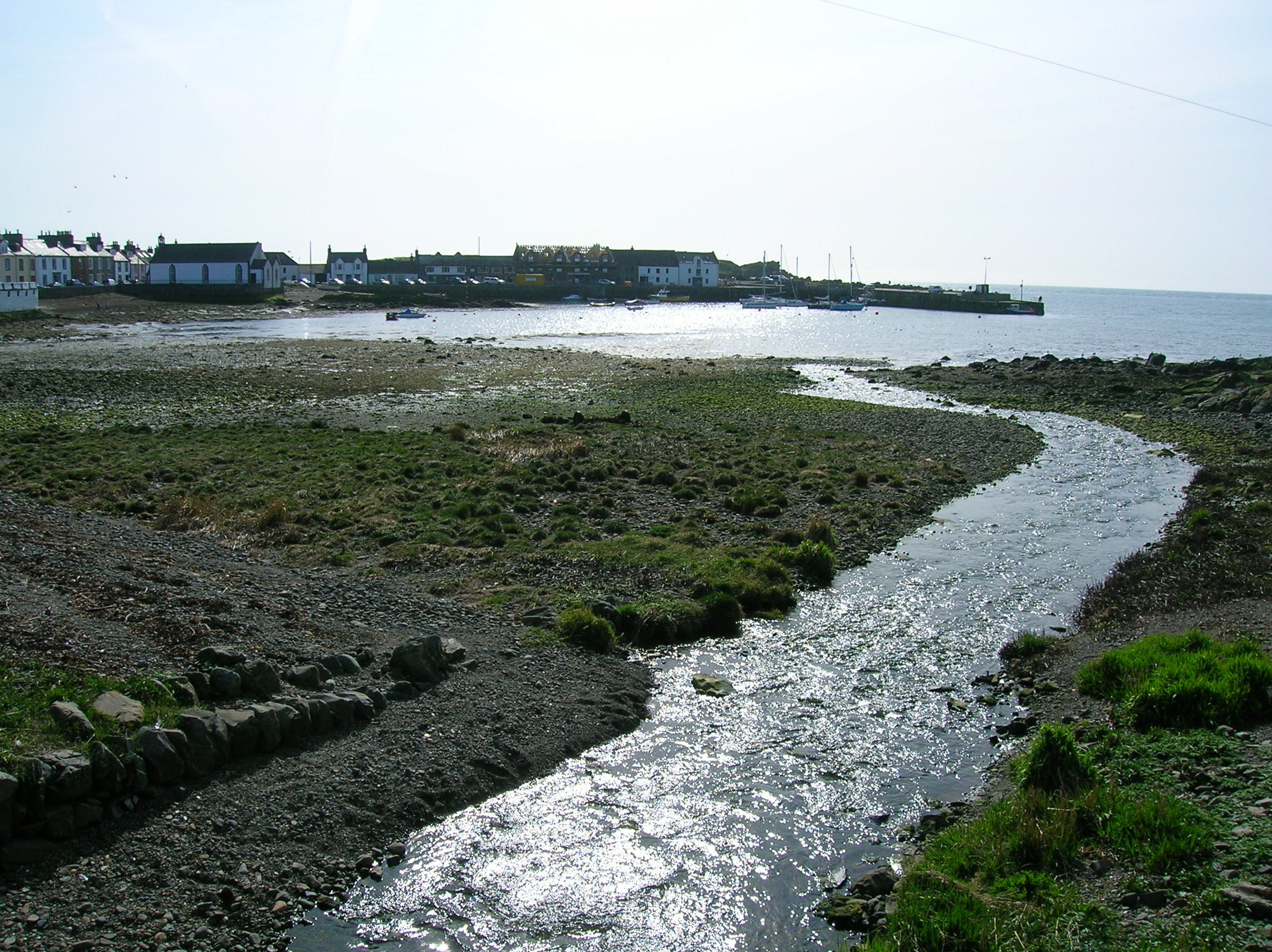
The Drummulin Burn and Isle of Whithorn harbour

The harbour remains the main focal point of the village. The Isle's own fleet is engaged in light trawling and lobster fishing. A number of leisure craft are kept here and the Isle is increasingly being used as a stopping off location for pleasure traffic plying the west coast, and as a launching site for trailer based craft such as small angling boats and diving RIB's.

A pier was first erected in the 16th century, but a more substantial structure was erected in 1790 to advance commerce, such as the trade with Whitehaven and other English ports. In 1969 the pier was badly damaged by storm and was only rebuilt after a prolonged campaign by local people. The perch is a reef of rock that runs out from the west side of the mouth of the Isle bay; it can be a hazard to craft coming into the Isle and for many years the end was marked with an iron pole.

In the 19th century the Isle also had strong trade links with Ireland and the Isle of Man, and ships were being built as well as sailed from here. The Countess of Galloway, the steam packet, once regularly sailed from here to Liverpool. By the end of the 20th century trading vessels had given way almost entirely to yachts and other leisure craft.

The Wigtown Bay Sailing Club welcomes all visiting yachtsmen whether they arrive by sea or by land with trailered boats. The clubhouse is situated on the harbour and has all the usual facilities. The harbour dries three hours either side of high water, and there is a dedicated visitors' berth at the outer end of the quay. There are also two slipways for launching trailer boats or dinghies, one of which is at the inner end of the quay and is sheltered in all weathers. The other, which gives access into the bay, can be used at virtually any state of the tide. The club is active throughout the summer with dinghy or cruiser races organised for most weekends and some races mid-week.

An unusual feature of the harbour was a fish trap; a wall or dyke running across part of the upper portion of the inlet which trapped fish as the tide went out. This was still marked as late as the 1850s on the OS map.

== The Wicker Man ==
Various scenes from the 1973 horror film The Wicker Man were filmed in and around Isle of Whithorn. The climax of the film was filmed at St Ninian's Cave and on the clifftops at Burrow Head. The co-owner of the Isle of Whithorn castle, Elizabeth McAdam Laughland, plus several other local people featured in various scenes.

== See also ==
- List of castles in Scotland
