= RAF Wigtown =

Former Royal Air Force station in Dumfries and Galloway, Scotland

RAF Wigtown
- Wigtown, Newton Stewart, Dumfries and Galloway in Scotland
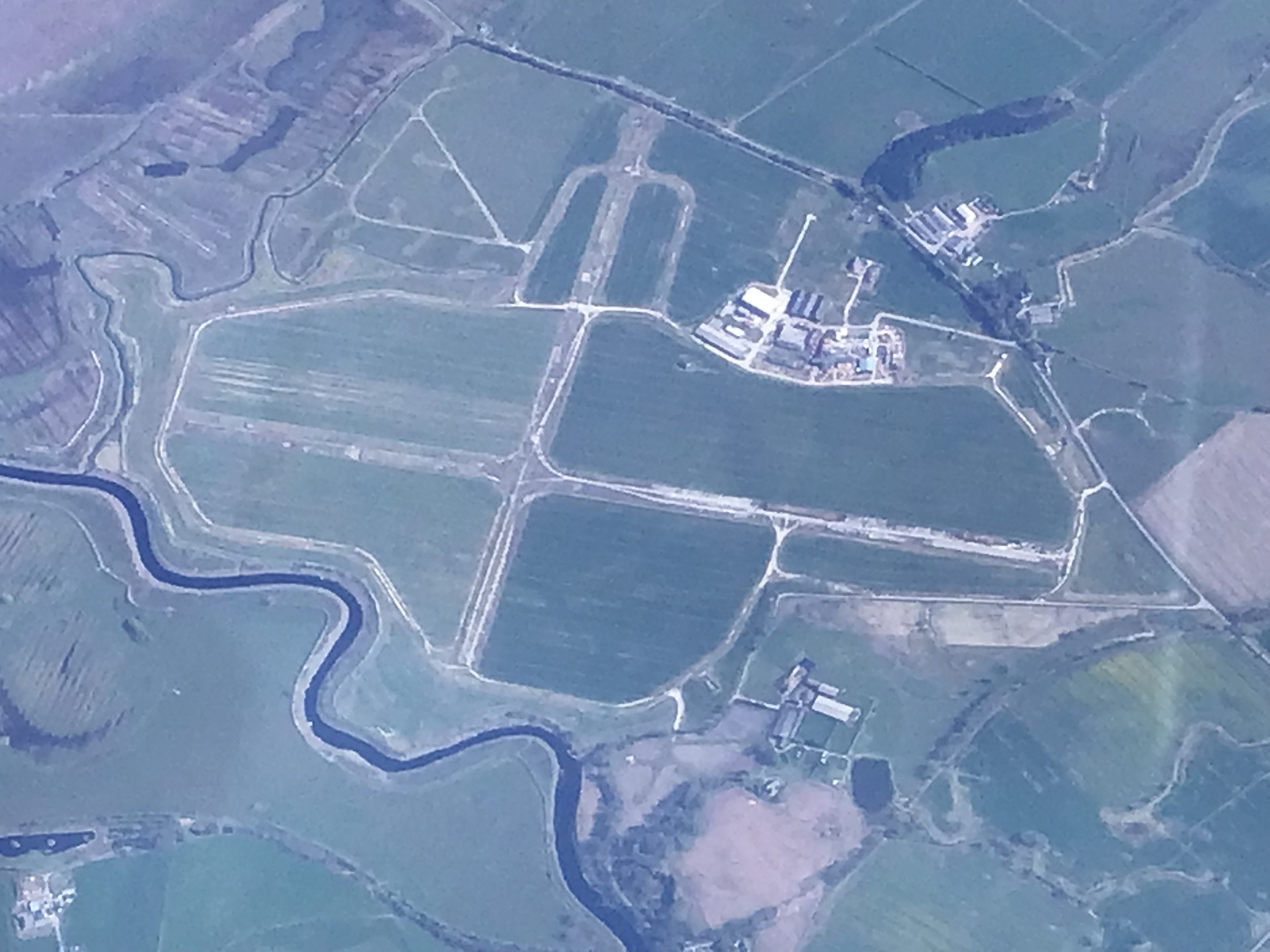
- RAF Wigtown

Site information
- Owner: Air Ministry
- Operator: Royal Air Force
- Controlled by: RAF Flying Training Command

Location
- Shown within Dumfries and Galloway RAF Wigtown (the United Kingdom)
- Coordinates: 54°51′10″N 004°26′31″W

Site history
- Built: 1941
- In use: 1941-1948
- Battles/wars: European theatre of World War II

Airfield information
- Elevation: 6 metres (20 ft) AMSL
Runways
Direction	Length and surface
07/25	1,460 metres (4,790 ft) Concrete
16/34	1,150 metres (3,773 ft) Concrete

Royal Air Force Wigtown or more simply RAF Wigtown, is a former Royal Air Force station within the Dumfries and Galloway region of southwest Scotland. It was built on the Machars peninsula near the village of Wigtown and lies east of Stranraer and south of Newton Stewart. The airfield is bordered on its northern side by the River Bladnoch

The Station was operational between 1941 and 1945, and from 1947 to 1948. During its use as a training station RAF Wigtown was home to No. 1 Air Observers School which in turn evolved into No. 1 Advanced Flying Unit (Observer), RAF Training Command, as well as providing a short-term home for several operational squadrons. RAF Wigtown came under the operational control of No. 29 Group, RAF.

== History ==
RAF Wigtown opened in 1941 and was originally used as a relief landing ground for RAF West Freugh. A detachment from 114 Squadron (114 Sqn) equipped with Bristol Blenheim (Mk1s) operated from the Station from July until September 1941. At the time of its opening RAF Wigtown consisted of grass runways, however flooding of the land soon caused these to become unusable, and two concrete runways were installed during 1942.

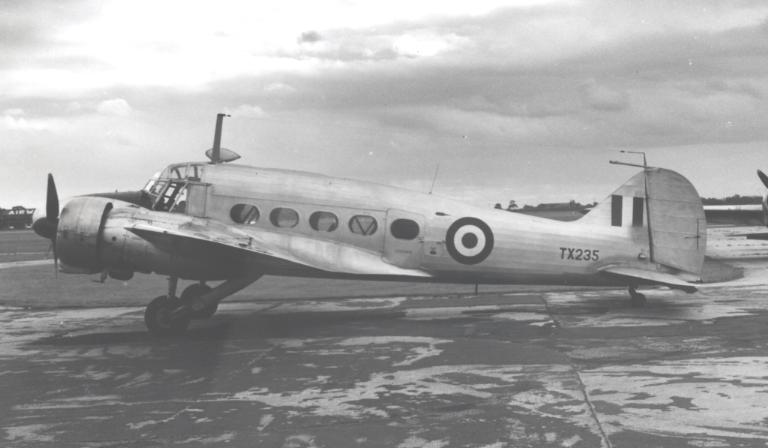
Avro Ansons were operated by No. 1 Air Observers School and later by No. 1 Advanced Flying Unit (Observer), at RAF Wigtown

=== No. 1 Air Observers School ===
The Station hosted the No. 1 Air Observers School which was in operation from 13 September 1941 until 1 February 1942, when it was replaced by No. 1 (Observers) Advanced Flying Unit which operated until 12 November 1945. The training units were equipped with Avro Ansons which were used in conjunction with a tracked target range near the coast to the southeast.

=== Operational Squadrons ===
For short periods RAF Wigtown played host to several operational squadrons. Sister squadrons 174 and 175 Squadrons were based on the Station having converted from the Hawker Hurricane to the Hawker Typhoon whilst they worked up to operational efficiency.

==== 114 Squadron ====
The first tenants of the Station were the Bristol Blenheim I of 114 Sqn, from July until September 1941.

==== 174 Squadron ====
Following their re-equipping with the Hawker Typhoon, 174 Sqn was based at RAF Wigtown from July until October 1943.

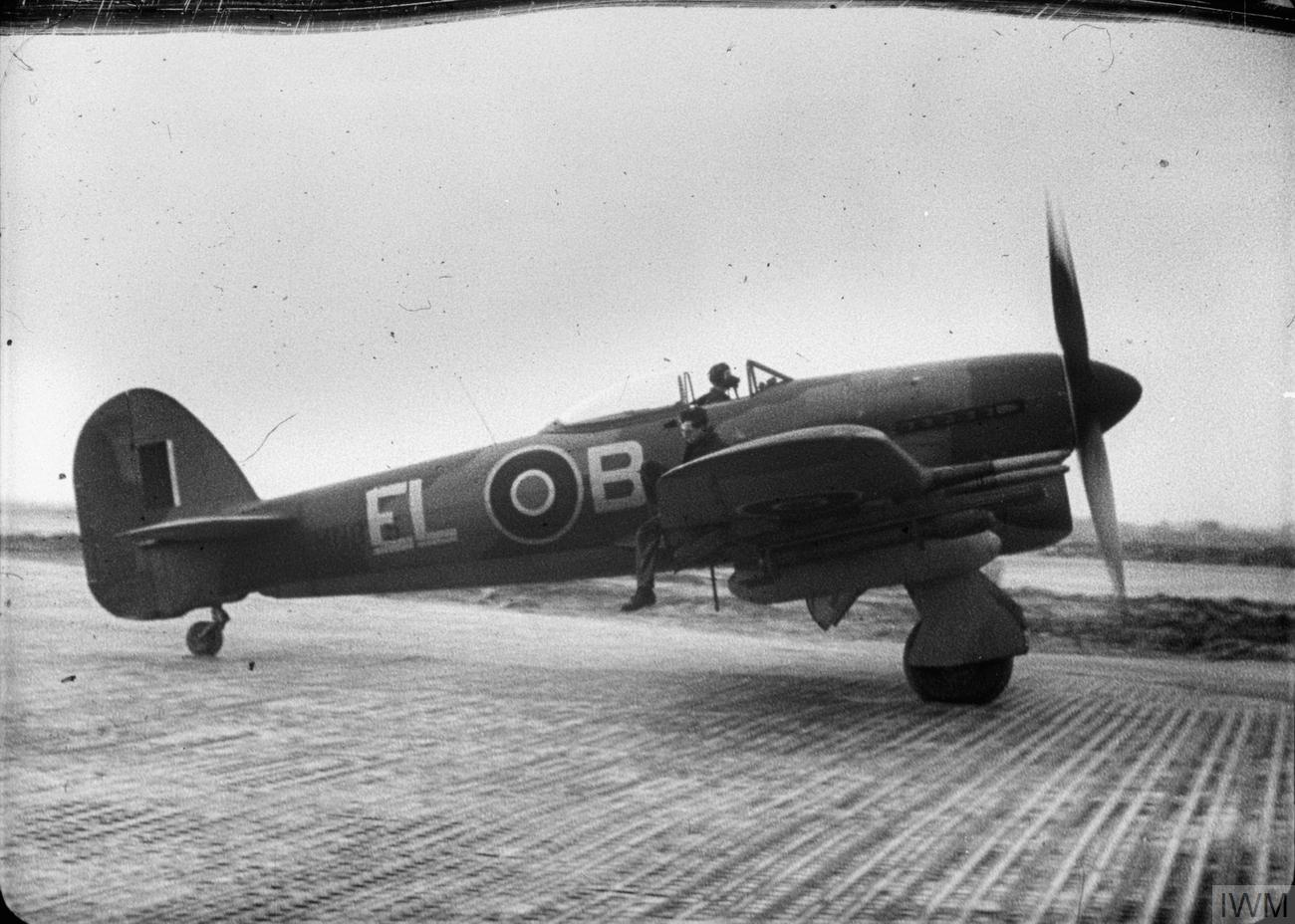
Hawker Typhoons were also briefly based at RAF Wigtown, operated by nos 174, 175 & 182 squadrons

==== 175 Squadron ====
Having also re-equipped with the Hawker Typhoon, 175 Sqn was based alongside its sister squadron (174 Sqn) at Wigtown from July until October 1943.

==== 182 Squadron ====
A third Hawker Typhoon squadron, 182 Squadron, also saw residency at RAF Wigtown. Their tenure was most brief, lasting from 18 to 22 September 1943.

==== No. 3206 Servicing Commando ====
A specialist front line group of aircraft engineers, No. 3206 Servicing Commando, was also based on the Station for a brief period from 18 to 26 September 1943.

=== Care and Maintenance ===
Operations at the airfield ceased in November 1945, with the Station being given over to RAF Maintenance Command. Placed on care and maintenance the station became home to No. 14 Maintenance Unit from 1 July 1946, with 14 MU remaining at the station until May 1948.

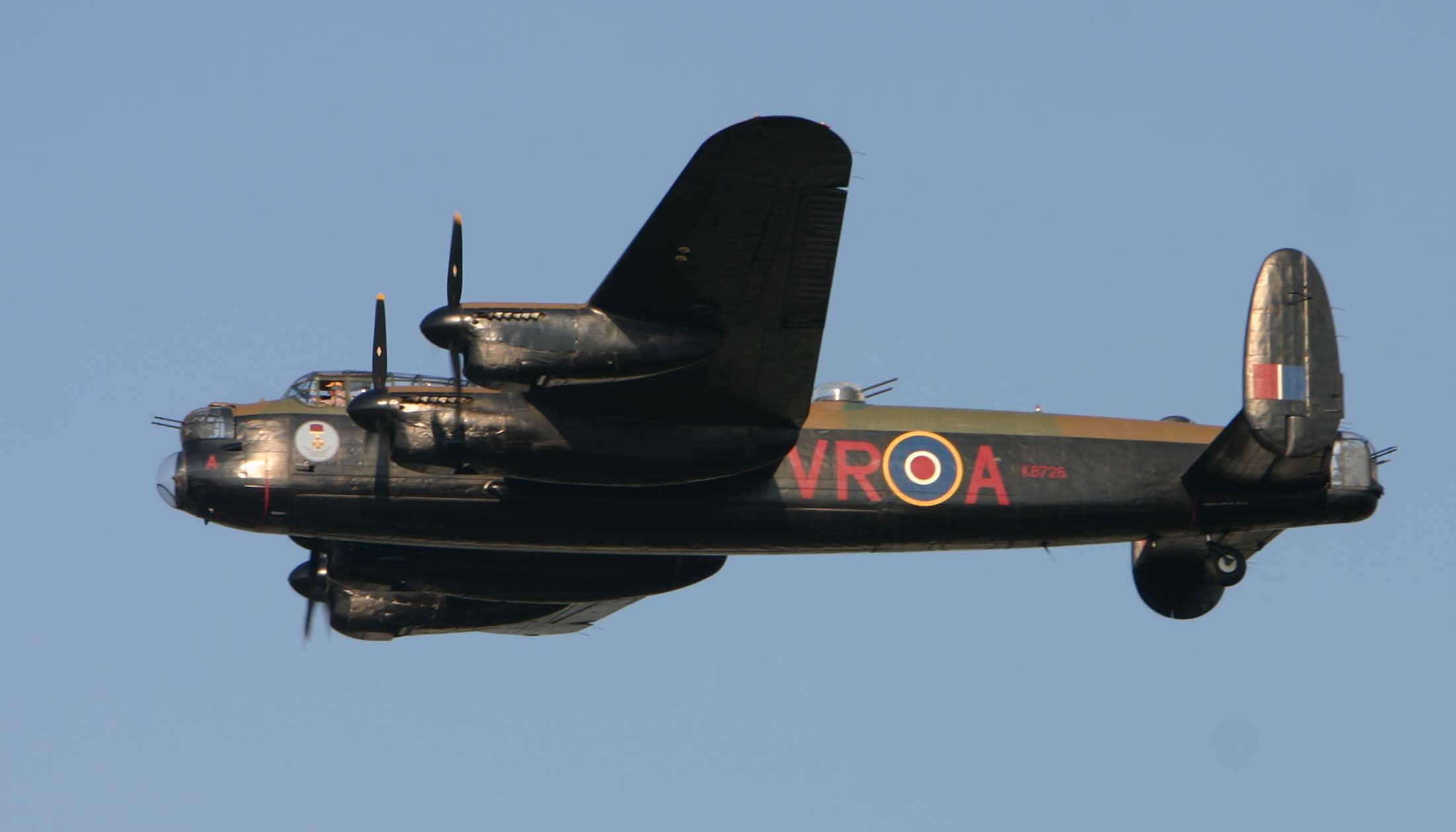
The Avro Lancaster saw service at RAF Wigtown as part of the Bomber Command Trials Unit

=== Bomber Command Trials Unit ===
Flying operations resumed at RAF Wigtown in June 1947 with the arrival of the Trials Unit of RAF Bomber Command on the Station. Equipped with Avro Lancasters, the unit operated from the Station until May 1948.

=== Closure ===
Following a rationalisation within the RAF the decision was taken to close RAF Wigtown. The Station closed in May 1948, and was given over to civilian use.

== Units ==
During the course of the operation of the station, the following units were at sometime based at RAF Wigtown:

07/41 to 09/41, 114 Sqn with Bristol Blenheims

09/41 to 02/42, No. 1 Air Observers School with Avro Ansons

02/42 to 11/45, No. 1 (Observers) Advanced Flying Unit with Avro Anson

07/43 to 10/43, 174 Squadron with Hawker Typhoons

07/43 to 10/43, 175 Squadron with Hawker Typhoons

09/43 to 09/43, 182 Squadron with Hawker Typhoons

09/43 to 09/43, No. 3206 Servicing Commando

07/46 to 03/48, 14 Maintenance Unit

06/47 to 03/48, Bomber Command Trials Unit with Avro Lancasters

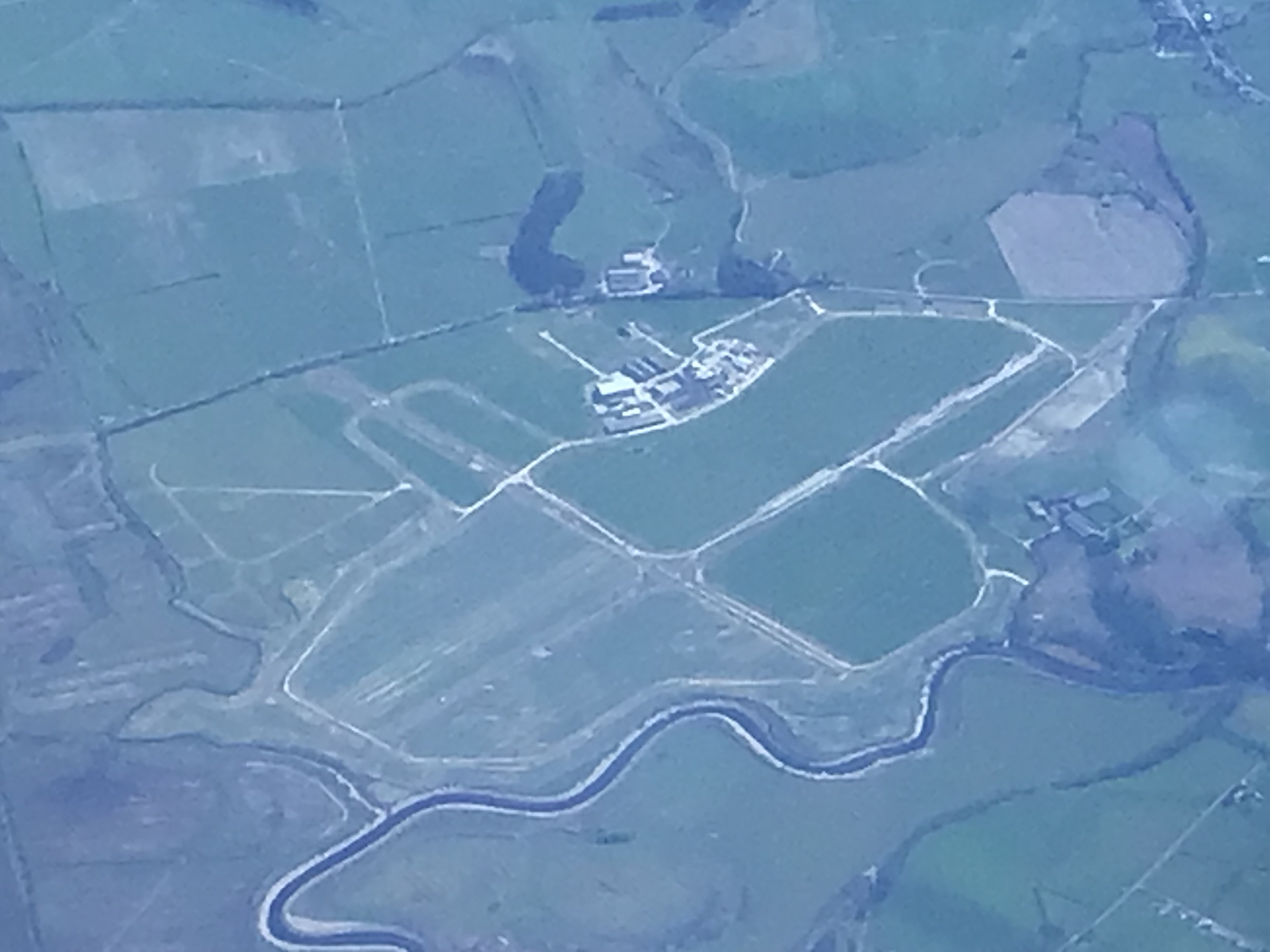
RAF Wigtown (April 2023)

== Current use ==
Despite considerable deterioration the airfield remains intact; with the original control tower still standing and nearly all the perimeter and access roads remaining. Within the locality the airfield is often referred to as Baldoon Airfield.

Furthermore, the concrete bases of many of the hangars and other buildings can still be seen on the ground. In the 1980s the airfield was being operated by the Baldoon Flying Group. Today much of the land has reverted to agricultural use, with the site becoming popular for locals to conduct leisure activities – such as walking or cycling. The airfield is also the venue for light industrial activity, with a saw mill occupying part of the site.
