= Tarf Water =

Tarf Water may refer to:

- Tarf Water, Perthshire
- Tarf Water, Wigtownshire

== See also ==
- Tarff Water
- River Tarff
