= List of listed buildings in Kirkcowan, Dumfries and Galloway =

This is a list of listed buildings in the civil parish of Kirkcowan in Dumfries and Galloway, Scotland.

== List ==
Name	Location	Date Listed	Grid Ref. (Note: Sometimes known as OSGB36, the grid reference (where provided) is based on the British national grid reference system used by the Ordnance Survey. • "Guide to National Grid". Ordnance Survey. • "Get-a-map". Ordnance Survey.)	Geo-coordinates	Notes	LB Number (Note: Historic Environment Scotland assign a unique alphanumeric identifier to each designated site in Scotland, for listed buildings this always begins with "LB", for example "LB12345".)	Image
Kirkcowan Village Kirkcowan School Schoolhouse And Boundary Walls				54°54′57″N 4°36′42″W	Category B	13101	Upload Photo
Mark Of Shennanton Steading				54°56′58″N 4°35′33″W	Category B	13105	Upload Photo
Half Way House				54°55′14″N 4°38′43″W	Category C(S)	10078	Upload Photo
Kirkcowan Village, Main Street, The White House				54°54′51″N 4°36′34″W	Category C(S)	10069	Upload Photo
Kirkcowan Village 8 And 10 Main Street Braeside				54°54′53″N 4°36′36″W	Category C(S)	13096	Upload Photo
42 Main Street Nursery With Gates Gatepiers And Boundary Walls				54°54′48″N 4°36′31″W	Category C(S)	13097	Upload Photo
Kirkcowan Waulk Mill Mill Building And Weaving Sheds And Stack				54°54′32″N 4°36′08″W	Category B	13102	Upload Photo
Johnston's Bridge Over Tarff Water				54°54′37″N 4°35′42″W	Category B	10079	Upload Photo
Kirkcowan Village 19 And 21 Main Street Fleming House				54°54′51″N 4°36′33″W	Category B	10071	Upload Photo
Lincuan Bridge				54°54′32″N 4°36′19″W	Category B	13104	Upload Photo
Kirkcowan Village 23 Main Street The Craighlaw Arms				54°54′51″N 4°36′32″W	Category B	10072	Upload Photo
Boreland Farmhouse				54°53′33″N 4°34′14″W	Category B	10075	Upload Photo
Craichlaw House				54°54′57″N 4°38′38″W	Category A	10076	Upload Photo
Kirkcowan Village, Kirkcowan Parish Church (C Of S) And Boundary Walls				54°54′55″N 4°36′40″W	Category A	10066	Upload Photo
Kirkcowan Village Kirkcowan Old Parish Church And Churchyard				54°54′43″N 4°36′27″W	Category C(S)	10067	Upload Photo
Kirkcowan Village Kirkland House (Former Kirkcowan Manse				54°54′39″N 4°36′21″W	Category B	13100	Upload Photo
Kirkcowan Waulk Mill House				54°54′33″N 4°36′07″W	Category B	13103	Upload Photo
Barhoise Mill				54°55′22″N 4°35′28″W	Category B	10073	Upload Photo
Shennanton House Quadrant Walls, Gatepiers Gate And Railings				54°56′32″N 4°35′29″W	Category B	13107	Upload Photo
Kirkcowan Village, Main Street, The Blue House				54°54′52″N 4°36′35″W	Category C(S)	10068	Upload Photo
Shennanton Old Bridge				54°56′11″N 4°35′14″W	Category B	13109	Upload Photo
Kirkcowan Village 58 Main Street Ashley Bank				54°54′45″N 4°36′28″W	Category B	13098	Upload Photo
Kirkcowan Village 69 And 71 Main Street Tarff Hotel				54°54′45″N 4°36′25″W	Category C(S)	13099	Upload Photo
Shennanton New Bridge				54°56′09″N 4°35′15″W	Category B	13108	Upload Photo
Kirkcowan Village 37 Main Street Skeldon				54°54′49″N 4°36′30″W	Category B	13094	Upload Photo
Kirkcowan Village 39 Main Street				54°54′48″N 4°36′30″W	Category C(S)	13095	Upload Photo
Bridge Over Bladnoch River At Glassoch				54°59′33″N 4°36′24″W	Category B	10077	Upload Photo
Kirkcowan Village 13 Main Street				54°54′52″N 4°36′34″W	Category B	10070	Upload Photo
Shennanton House				54°56′45″N 4°35′35″W	Category A	13106	Upload Photo
Spittal Bridge				54°53′20″N 4°33′29″W	Category B	13110	Upload Photo
Kirkcowan Village 31 Main Street (The Stepps)				54°54′50″N 4°36′31″W	Category B	13092	Upload Photo
Kirkcowan Village 33-35 (Odd Nos) Main Street				54°54′49″N 4°36′31″W	Category B	13093	Upload Photo
Barnearnie Bridge				54°54′05″N 4°38′13″W	Category C(S)	10074	Upload Photo

== Key ==
The scheme for classifying buildings in Scotland is:

- Category A: "buildings of national or international importance, either architectural or historic; or fine, little-altered examples of some particular period, style or building type."
- Category B: "buildings of regional or more than local importance; or major examples of some particular period, style or building type, which may have been altered."
- Category C: "buildings of local importance; lesser examples of any period, style, or building type, as originally constructed or moderately altered; and simple traditional buildings which group well with other listed buildings."

In March 2016 there were 47,288 listed buildings in Scotland. Of these, 8% were Category A, and 50% were Category B, with the remaining 42% being Category C.
