= List of listed buildings in Kirkinner, Dumfries and Galloway =

This is a list of listed buildings in the civil parish of Kirkinner, in Dumfries and Galloway, Scotland.

== List ==
Name	Location	Date Listed	Grid Ref. (Note: Sometimes known as OSGB36, the grid reference (where provided) is based on the British national grid reference system used by the Ordnance Survey. • "Guide to National Grid". Ordnance Survey. • "Get-a-map". Ordnance Survey.)	Geo-coordinates	Notes	LB Number (Note: Historic Environment Scotland assign a unique alphanumeric identifier to each designated site in Scotland, for listed buildings this always begins with "LB", for example "LB12345".)	Image
Malzie Bridge				54°51′19″N 4°32′20″W	Category C(S)	13117	Upload Photo
Baldoon Castle Gatepiers				54°51′09″N 4°27′13″W	Category A	10109	Upload another image
37 Main Street				54°49′57″N 4°27′26″W	Category C(S)	10120	Upload Photo
Longcastle Schoolhouse And Former School Rooms (Now Workshops)				54°48′00″N 4°31′10″W	Category C(S)	13116	Upload Photo
Barnbarroch Stables				54°49′59″N 4°29′44″W	Category B	10111	Upload Photo
Braehead, Craigielea				54°50′23″N 4°27′38″W	Category C(S)	10113	Upload Photo
Kirkinner Parish Church (C Of S) St Kennera And Churchyard With Vans-Agnew Mausoleum				54°49′59″N 4°27′24″W	Category B	13113	Upload Photo
Kirkinner School With Retaining Wall				54°50′01″N 4°27′30″W	Category C(S)	13114	Upload Photo
Knockencurr Farm And Steadings				54°48′55″N 4°27′00″W	Category B	13115	Upload Photo
Milldriggan Mill				54°50′20″N 4°27′35″W	Category B	13120	Upload Photo
Stewarton House				54°49′07″N 4°24′59″W	Category B	13122	Upload Photo
1 And 2 Stewarton Cottages				54°49′00″N 4°25′09″W	Category B	13123	Upload Photo
Barwhanny Windmill And Barn				54°48′51″N 4°28′31″W	Category B	10112	Upload Photo
Kirkinner Manse				54°50′01″N 4°27′17″W	Category B	13112	Upload Photo
Milldriggan Mill House				54°50′20″N 4°27′37″W	Category B	13119	Upload Photo
Braehead, Holly Cottage And Millers Cottage				54°50′24″N 4°27′41″W	Category C(S)	10114	Upload Photo
Barnbarroch House				54°50′00″N 4°29′45″W	Category B	13618	Upload Photo
47 Main Street				54°49′55″N 4°27′24″W	Category C(S)	13111	Upload Photo
Over Airies				54°48′17″N 4°29′40″W	Category B	13121	Upload Photo
12 Main Street				54°49′58″N 4°27′26″W	Category C(S)	10118	Upload Photo
45 Main Street				54°49′56″N 4°27′24″W	Category C(S)	10121	Upload Photo
Malzie Smithy				54°51′18″N 4°32′19″W	Category C(S)	13118	Upload Photo
Baldoon Mains				54°51′12″N 4°27′15″W	Category B	10110	Upload Photo
25 Main Street				54°49′58″N 4°27′29″W	Category C(S)	10119	Upload Photo

== Key ==
The scheme for classifying buildings in Scotland is:

- Category A: "buildings of national or international importance, either architectural or historic; or fine, little-altered examples of some particular period, style or building type."
- Category B: "buildings of regional or more than local importance; or major examples of some particular period, style or building type, which may have been altered."
- Category C: "buildings of local importance; lesser examples of any period, style, or building type, as originally constructed or moderately altered; and simple traditional buildings which group well with other listed buildings."

In March 2016 there were 47,288 listed buildings in Scotland. Of these, 8% were Category A, and 50% were Category B, with the remaining 42% being Category C.
