= Thomas Hugh Milroy =

Scottish physiologist and organic chemist (1869–1950)

Thomas Hugh Milroy FRSE (1869 – 20 March 1950) was a Scottish physiologist and organic chemist.

== Life ==
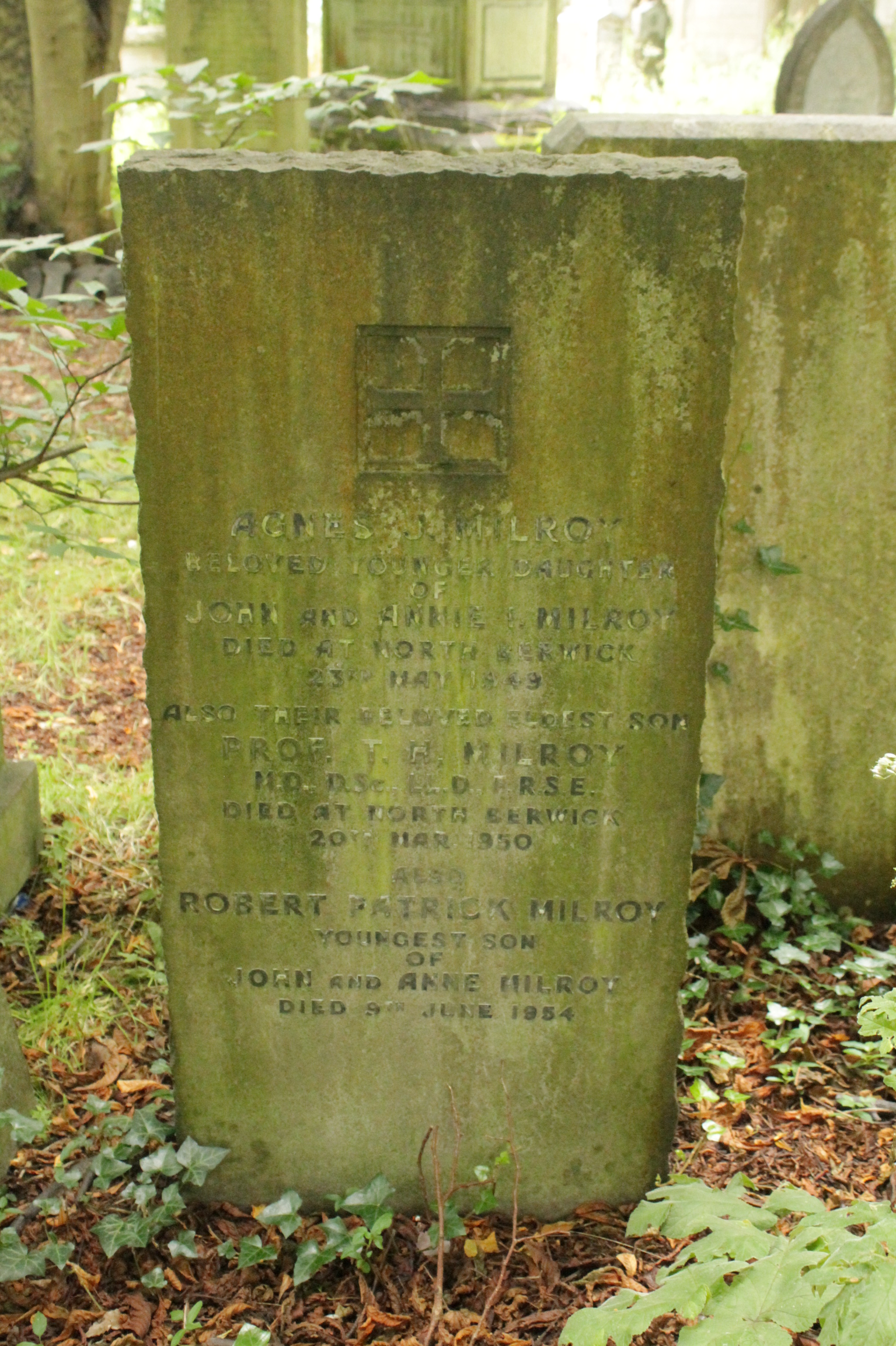
The grave of T H Milroy, Warriston Cemetery

He was born in Kirkcowan in Wigtownshire, the eldest son of Annie and John Milroy. His parents moved to 8 Salisbury Road in Edinburgh in the 1870s.

He was educated locally then studied medicine at the University of Edinburgh. He undertook postgraduate studies in Germany at Berlin and Marburg then returned to Edinburgh as assistant to Sir Edward Albert Sharpey-Schafer.

In 1898 he was elected a Fellow of the Royal Society of Edinburgh. His proposers were William Rutherford, Sir William Turner, Sir Thomas Richard Fraser and Alexander Crum Brown. At this stage he was still living with his parents but they had moved to a very grand villa at 57 Inverleith Row.

In 1902 he was appointed Professor of Physiology at Queen's College, Belfast and he got his younger brother John to join him as a lecturer. John later became Professor of Biochemistry.

He retired back to Scotland in 1935.

He died in North Berwick on 20 March 1950. He is buried with his sister in Warriston Cemetery in north Edinburgh. The grave lies north east of the central roundel. His parents lie to his east side.

He did not marry and had no children.

== Publications ==
- Textbook of Practical Physiological Chemistry (with his brother John Alexander Milroy) (1904)
