= Kirkcowan =

Village in Wigtownshire, Scotland

Coordinates: 54.914°N 4.609°W

Kirkcowan: Scottish Gaelic: Cille Chomhainn
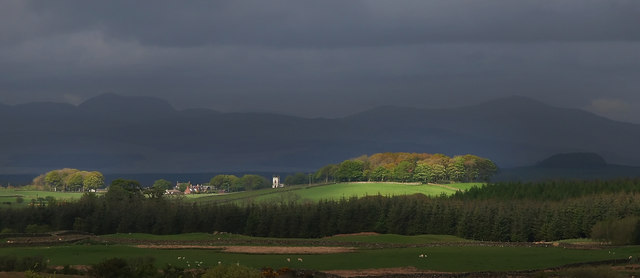
- Barlennan Hill and Kirkcowan Church

- Location within Dumfries and Galloway
- Population: 607
- OS grid reference: NX323575
- Council area: Dumfries and Galloway
- Lieutenancy area: Wigtown
- Country: Scotland
- Sovereign state: United Kingdom
- Post town: Newton Stewart
- Postcode district: DG8
- Dialling code: 01671
- Police: Scotland
- Fire: Scottish
- Ambulance: Scottish
- UK Parliament: Dumfries and Galloway
- Scottish Parliament: Galloway and West Dumfries

Kirkcowan is a village and rural parish in Wigtownshire, Scotland. In 1846, the parish had a recorded population of 607.

The River Bladnoch runs to the east of the village and the River Tarff to the west.

A map of the area/parish can be seen at the National Library of Scotland, on the John Ainslie map AD1782.

Kirkcowan's principal industry has historically been agriculture, although in the 19th century two woollen mills were erected on the River Tarff.

== Location ==
The village of Kirkcowan lies on the road to Wigtown, situated between the rivers Tarff and Bladnoch.

The A75 road runs through Kirkcowan and forms part of the London–Belfast route. The road is also part of the international E-road, European route E18.

Kirkcowan lies on the medieval pilgrim route to Whithorn Priory, a historic centre of Christianity in Scotland.

== Features and amenities ==
Because the village is situated on the main Stranraer to Carlisle bus route, and between the rivers Bladnoch and Tarff, it attracts fishermen, hikers and cyclists. The village lies on the Machars Yellow cycle route.

The village church, erected in 1829 under the patronage of the Agnew family, is a substantial structure with a tower. A congregation of Seceders previously assembled for public worship in an old barn.

Kirkcowan has a post office, nursery and primary school, village hall, service station, mechanical garage, pub/hotel (Craighlaw Arms), and a photography studio. There is also a community council.

== Places of interest ==
Glendarroch Loch, situated near the village and accessible from the A75 Euroroute, is a coarse fishing loch. It contains roach, rudd and perch, with carp stocked in recent years. Tench and bream up to 3 lb are also present.

Loch Maberry Castle Crannog is a fortified island surrounded by a drystone wall approximately 1.8 to 2.1 metres thick and about 2.1 metres high, enclosing an area of about 34.1 by 25.9 metres. The interior has been subdivided and contains several buildings of dry-stone construction. Entrances exist on the east and west, and the island is connected by causeways to both the loch shore and a nearby island.

The River Bladnoch rises at Loch Maberry in the parish of Kirkcowan and flows south to Polbae. Along its course it is joined by Reoch Burn, passes Isle-na-Gower, and forms a boundary between afforested land at Hopeless Howe and the Ring of Barfad. It is later joined by Black Burn and bordered by Barnley Plantation.

The river is crossed at various points, including stepping stones linking Mark of Shennanton with Little Eldrig, and Shennanton Bridge where the A75 crosses. It widens at Broad Wheel before continuing past Linn Wood and the Linn of Barhoise waterfall, where the term "linn" refers to the pool rather than the waterfall.

Further downstream, the river passes Barhoise Farm to Barhoise Mill. In 1684, according to Symson, there was a salmon fishery in this area on both the Bladnoch and the Tarff.

Barhoise Mill is a T-shaped two-storey structure of granite, whinstone and slate, now in a dilapidated state. The mill was driven by a wheel, of which only the wooden axle remains. The datestone reads 1827, though it is likely a reconstruction of an earlier mill associated with the nearby Old Place of Glaisnick, once a residence of the Gordon family of Craichlaw.

Eldrig Fell features a large circular cairn 18 metres in diameter and 2.2 metres high.

Boreland Mote, marked on OS mapping, stands beside the B733 and is approximately 20 feet high and 100–120 feet in circumference.

Mindork (or Mondork) Castle at Wood Hill is associated with Thomas M'Dowall (born c.1500).

Woodhill, located opposite Mindork Castle, is an archaeological site.

== Sport ==
Kirkcowan was formerly home to Tarff Rovers, a football club based in the village. Their ground, Balgreen Park, is still visible, though now derelict.

== History ==
William Gordon held charters of parts of the barony of Craichlaw in the parish of Kirkcowan in 1500, 1506–7, and 1515–16. He married Janet Baillie and was the ancestor of the Gordons of Craighlaw.

The Kirkcowan railway station on the Portpatrick and Wigtownshire Joint Railway closed in 1965.

A mill was erected in 1822 for the manufacture of woollen cloths, blankets, flannels, and other textiles, making use of the soft water of the River Tarff.

== Notable people ==
- Thomas Hugh Milroy FRSE, born here in 1869

== Listed Buildings ==
List of listed buildings in Kirkcowan, Dumfries and Galloway

== Gallery ==
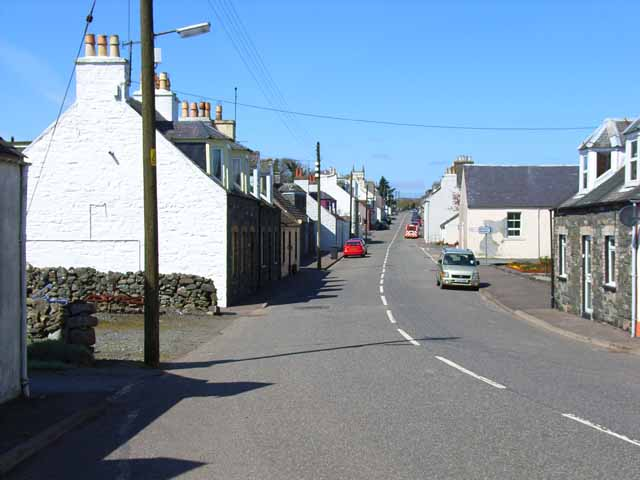
Street scene in Kirkcowan.

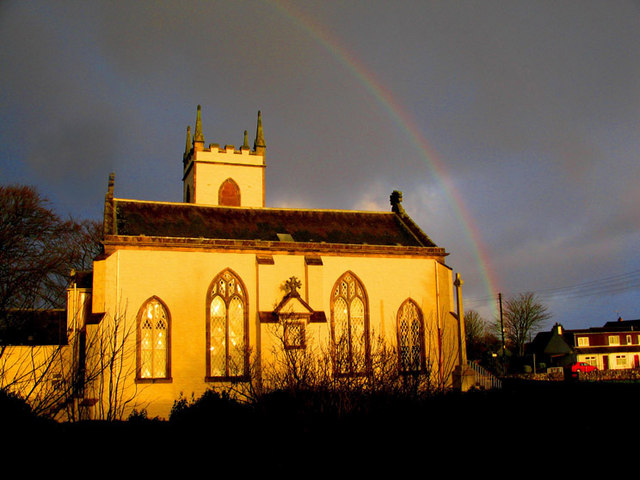
Kirkcowan Church.

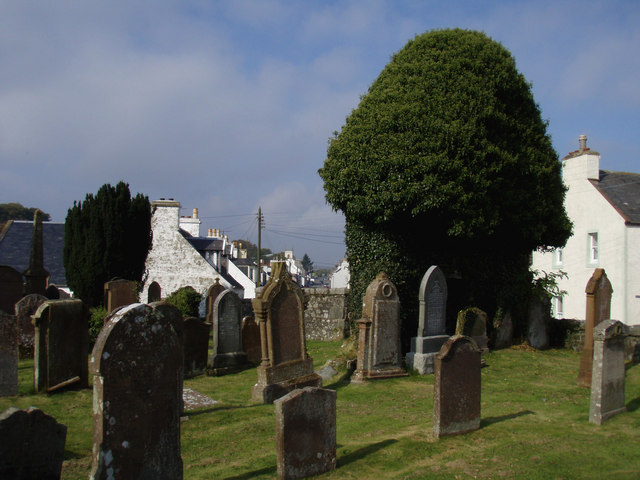
Old church, Kirkcowan.

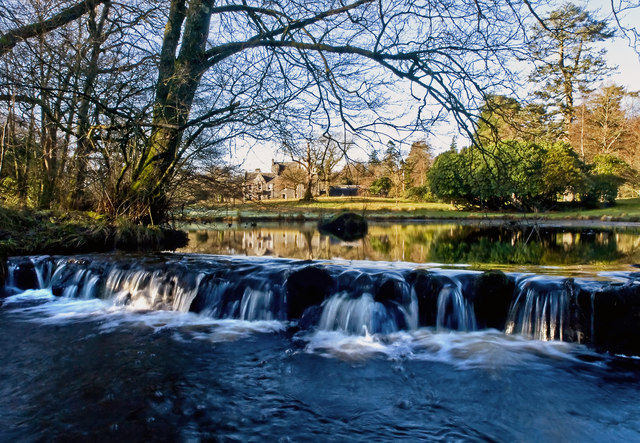
Craighlaw Castle.

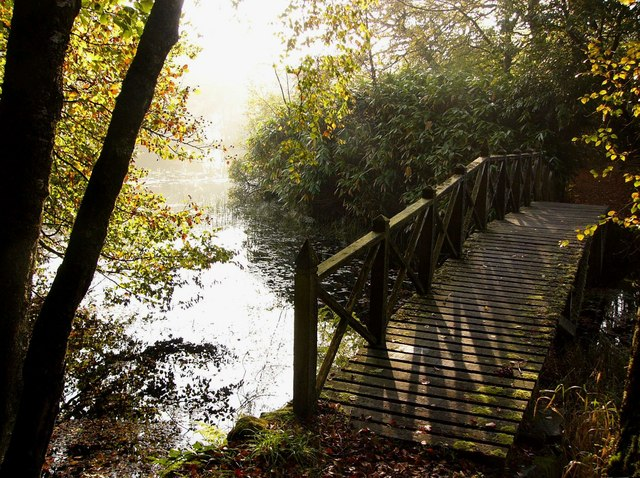
Bridge to island, Craichlaw Loch.

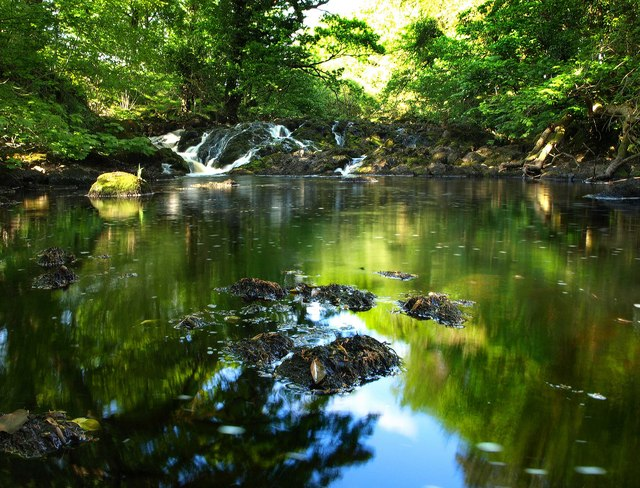
The Linn of Barhoise Waterfall on the River Bladnoch.

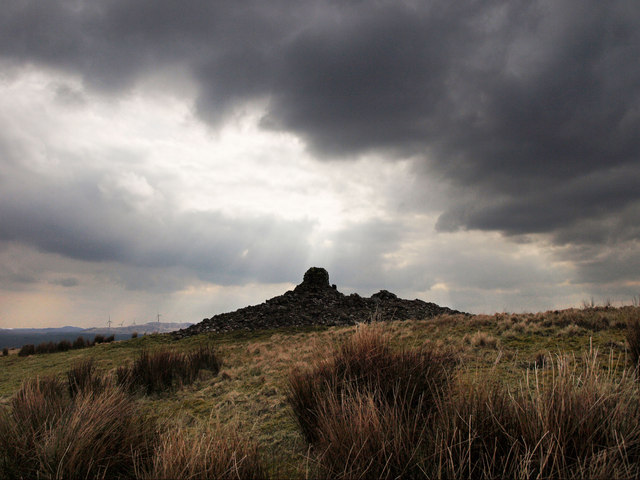
Eldrig Fell, large Wood Cairn.

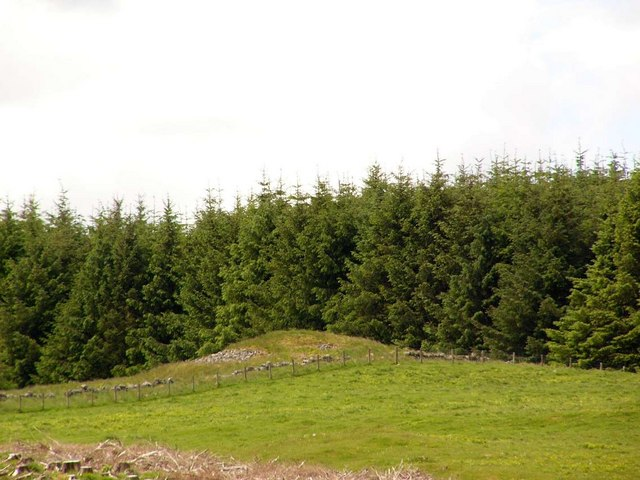
White Cairn.

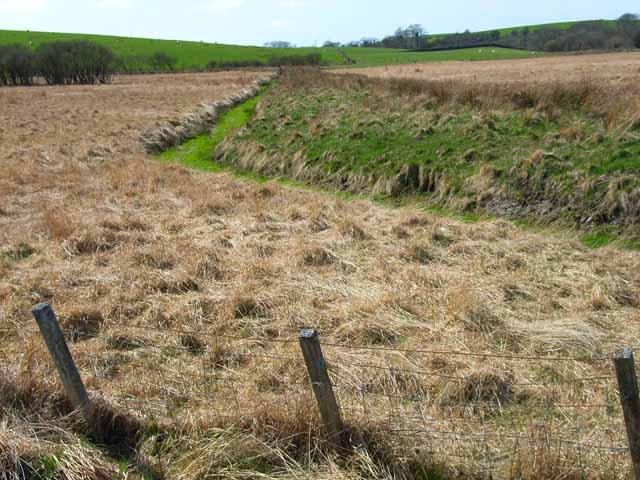
near Mindork or Mondork Castle ruin.

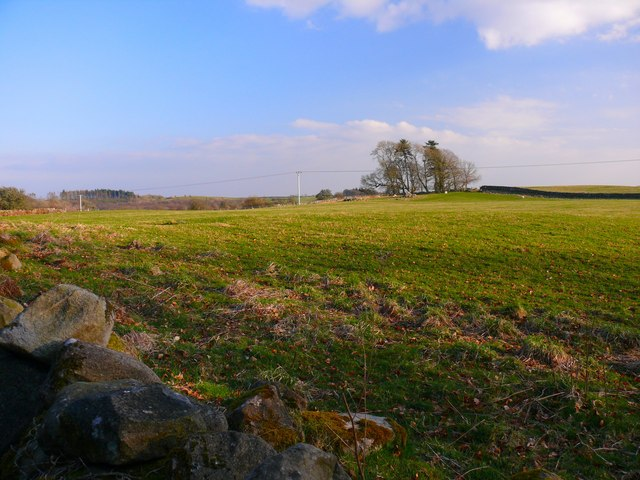
Shennanton. View across open farmland at Shennanton. Cairn in front of tall trees.

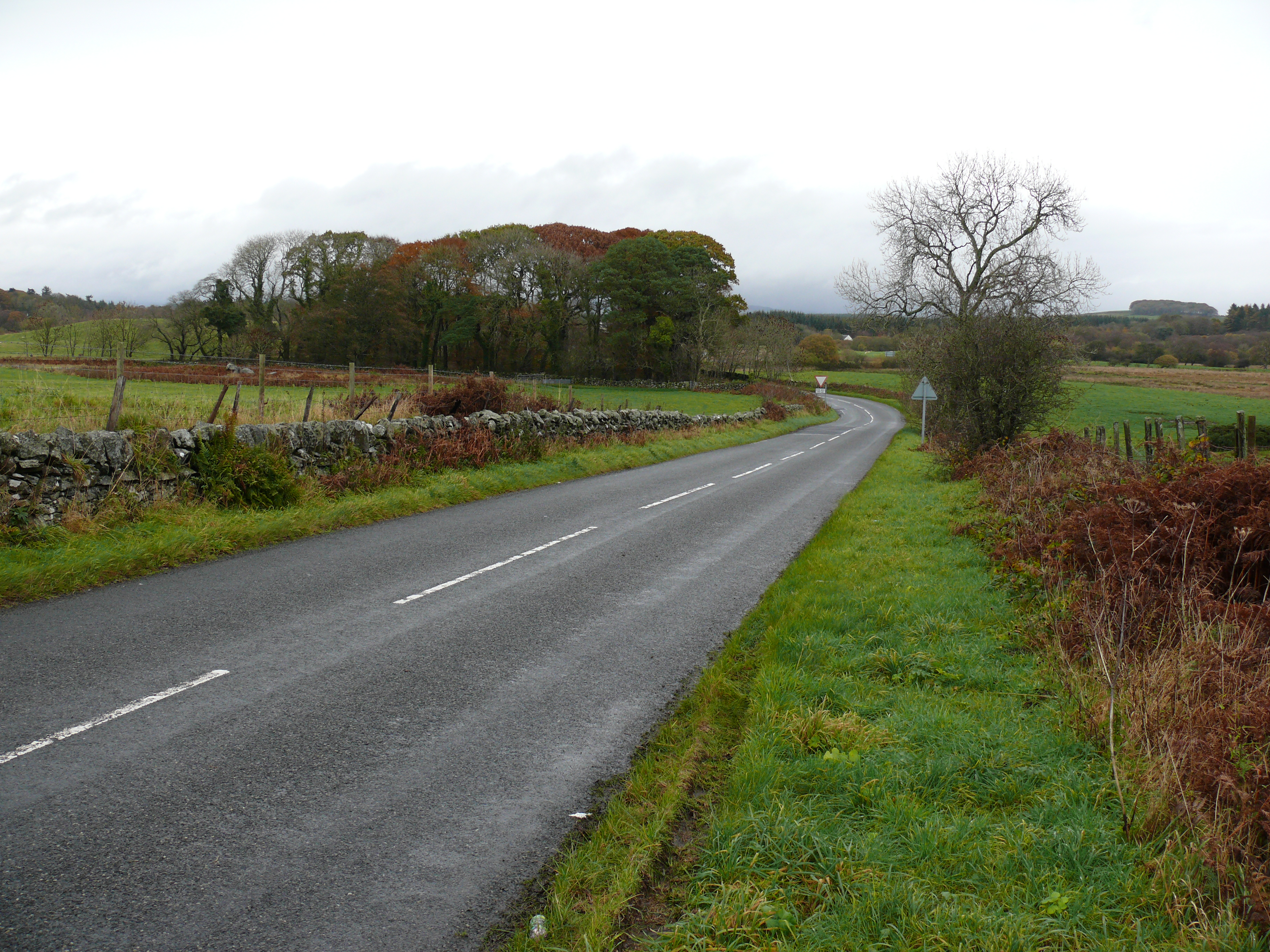
Shennanton. Between two cairns on the B735 road.

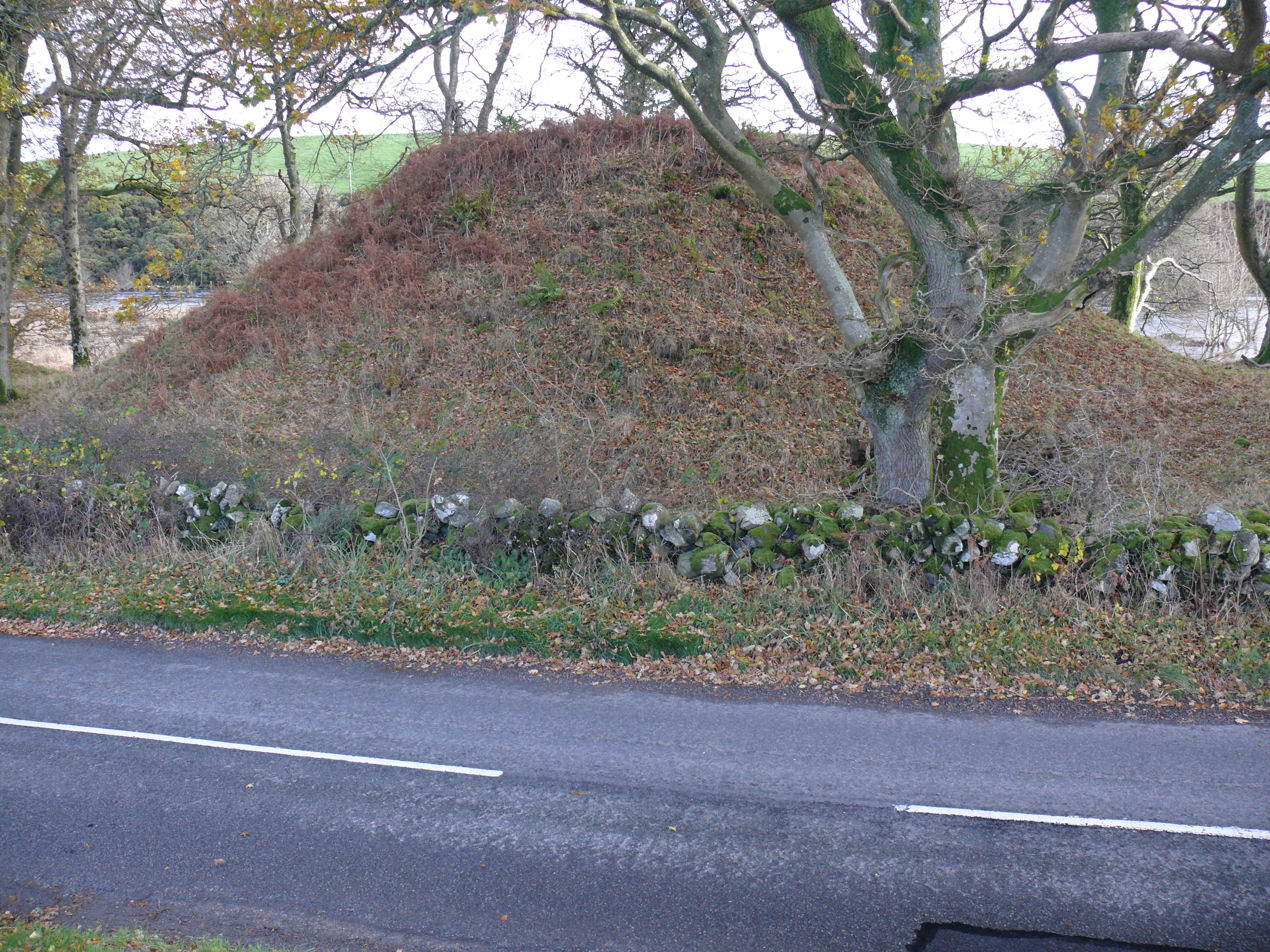
Boreland Mote or Motte.

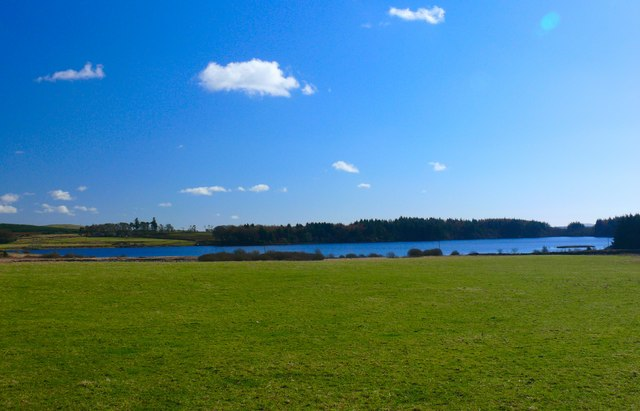
View towards archaeological site on southern shore of Loch Ronald.

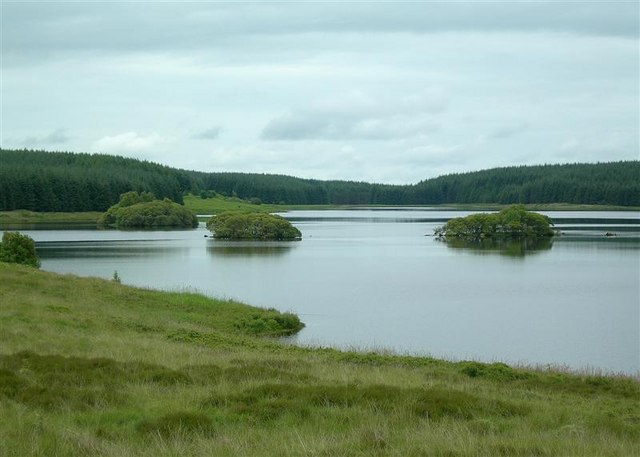
site of Loch Maberry Castle.
