= Kirkcowan railway station =

Disused railway station in Kirkcowan, Dumfries and Galloway

Kirkcowan
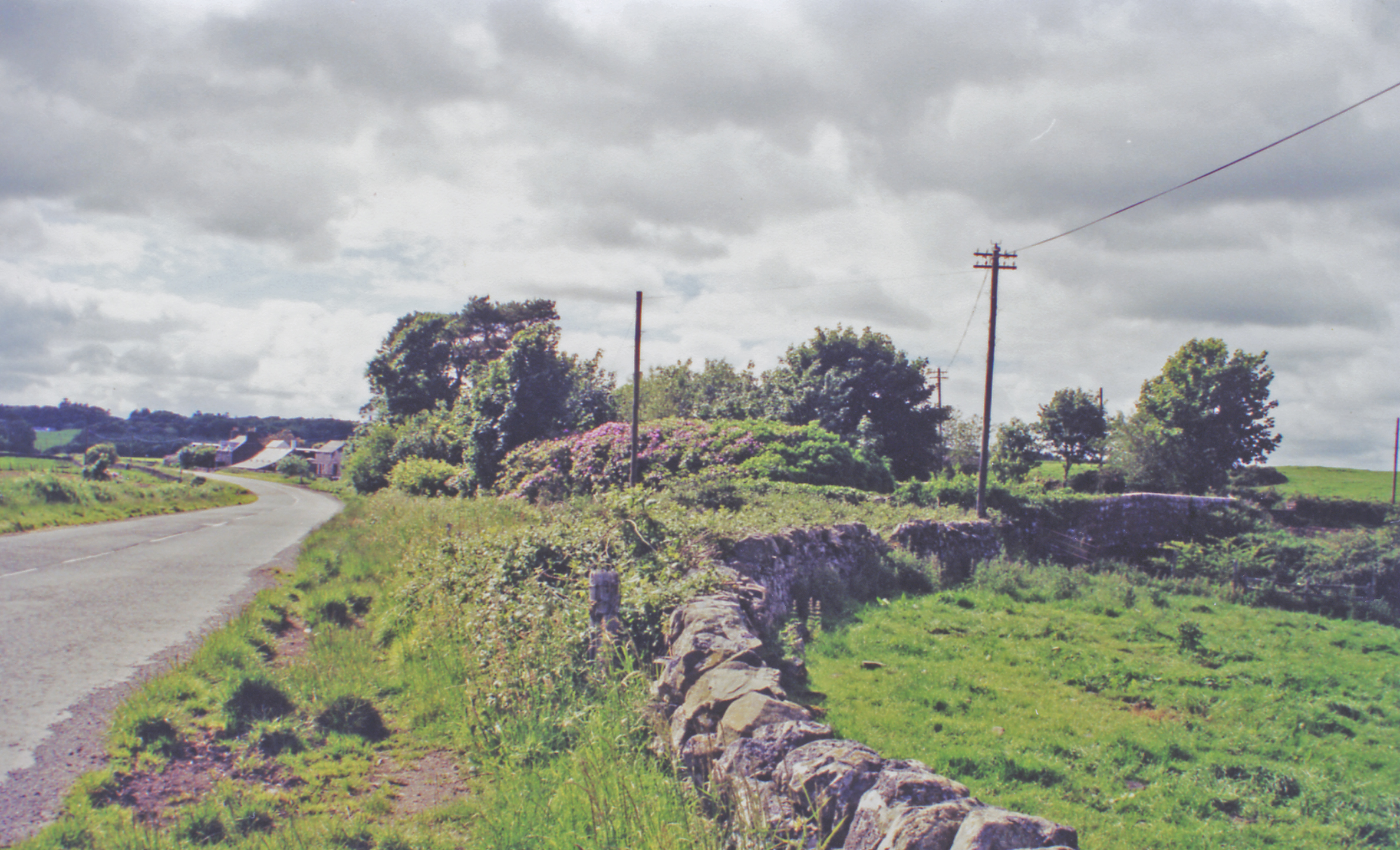
- The site of the station in 2000

General information
- Location: Kirkcowan, Dumfries and Galloway; Scotland
- Coordinates: 54.9157°N 4.6183°W
- Grid reference: NX322610
- Platforms: 2

Other information
- Status: Disused

History
- Original company: Portpatrick Railway
- Pre-grouping: Portpatrick and Wigtownshire Joint Railway; Caledonian Railway
- Post-grouping: London, Midland and Scottish Railway British Rail (Scottish Region)

Key dates
- 12 March 1861: Opened
- 14 June 1965: Closed
Location

Kirkcowan railway station served the village of Kirkcowan, Dumfries and Galloway, Scotland from 1861 to 1965 on the Portpatrick and Wigtownshire Joint Railway.

== History ==
The station opened on 12 March 1861 by the Portpatrick and Wigtownshire Joint Railway. To the northwest was the goods yard. It closed to both passengers and goods traffic on 14 June 1965.

Preceding station	Disused railways	Following station
Newton Stewart; Line and station closed	Portpatrick and Wigtownshire Joint Railway	Glenluce; Line and station closed
