= River Bladnoch =

River in Galloway, Scotland

Coordinates: 54°52′N 4°24′W

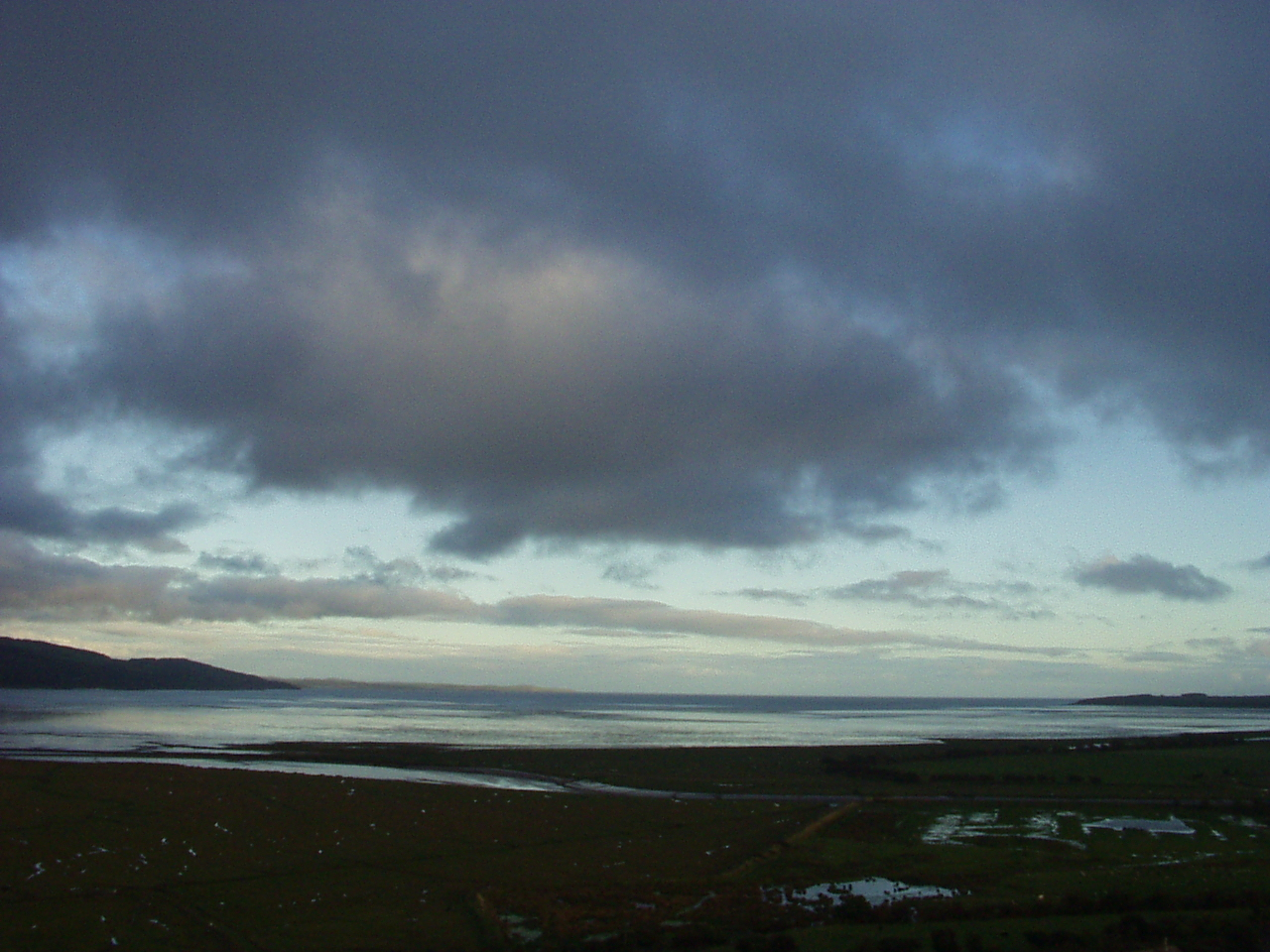
The river Bladnoch meets the Cree estuary in Wigtown Bay.

The Bladnoch is a river in Wigtownshire in the Machars of Galloway in southwest Scotland. One of the earliest descriptions of it is given by Sir Andrew Agnew of Lochnaw and Sir David Dunbar in an appendix to Andrew Symson's work "A Large Description of Galloway" written in the 17th century. In this they state that:

Blaidzenoch which floweth from the mountnous parts of Penninghame, and runs from the north to the south. It runneth through Lochmabary, (wherein there is ane little isle, with ane house upon it) and by the way it receaveth into several waters; the most considerable is the water of Tarfe, which hath its rise from Airtfeeld, in the Muirs of Luce, and falleth into Blaidzenoch, under the house of Craighlaw. The Blaidzenoch turns to the east, and after it heth fra its source run twenty miles (32 km), it falleth into the Bay of Wigtown, near above the place of Baldone.

== Course ==
The river Bladnoch rises at Loch Maberry in the parish of Kirkcowan, through which it runs south to Polbae. On its journey south it is joined by Reoch Burn as it passes through Carseriggan Moor. Continuing its journey it passes Isle-na-Gower and becomes a border between the afforested land at Hopeless Howe and the Ring of Barfad. Shortly after this it is met and joined by Black Burn. At this point the river is bordered on its east side by Barnley Plantation. Crossing the river at the stepping stones is a single-track road which links Mark of Shennanton with Little Eldrig. Shortly after this point the river widens briefly at Broad Wheel. Continuing on its journey southwards it is next forded by Shennanton Bridge where the A75 crosses it. Next we come to Linn Wood and the waterfall at Linn of Barhoise. The river then moves on past Barhoise Farm to Barhoise Mill. In 1684 according to Symson, this area had a salmon fishery with nets on both the Bladnoch and the Tarff. At the Mill of Barhoise, the Laird of Craichlaw had fishing rights. Barhoise Mill is a T-shaped two storey construction of granite, whinstone and slate, which is falling into a dilapidated state. The mill was driven by a wheel which was situated at the side of the building. Of this wheel only the wooden axle remains. The datestone above the door reads 1827, but this mill is most certainly a reconstruction of a much earlier one, perhaps connected with the Old Place of Glaisnick, a one-time nearby residence of the powerful Gordon family of Craichlaw. The main road from Kirkcowan to Wigtown and from Kirkcowan to Minnigaff via Glaisnick crossed the river just south of this mill. There are still stepping stones at the fording place east of Ring Farm.

Due east of Kirkcowan the Bladnoch unites with the Tarf Water. Two miles below this point the Laird of Grainge had fishing rights "beneath which, at severall places the said river, the Laird of Dereagill, on Kirkinner side, and the Laird of Torhouse, on Wigtown side, have severall places where they take salmon by nets, both which Lairds have an equal interest therein; and some yeares again, they fish together, and divide their fish equally."

In the reign of King David I (1124–1153) the Order of Knights Templar (established in 1118) was introduced into Galloway. These knights dressed in a white habit with a red cross on their cloaks. They operated Inns of Hospitality as one of their activities, and one of the inns was situated beside the Spittal of Bladnoch, the crossing place on the main road from Wigtown to Portpatrick and Ireland.

About one mile (1.6 km) south of Dalreagle, in the parish of Kirkinner, the Water of Malzie empties itself into the Bladnoch. Soon after this the river comes to Torhouse Mill, one of the early mills which, incorporating a farm steading, ground corn. The wheelpit and lade, part of the 19th century mill which was powered by the river, can still be traced. Very near this on the riverside is the ruined site of a waulkmill which was a wool manufactory. By 1792 it employed 40 workers making "plaiding and flannel" for export to England. A weir below this is just south of the site of a farina mill. Newmilns is two miles (3.2 km) west of Wigtown. It was a small T-shaped mill of three storeys, built into the river bank. The building has been completely gutted and is now made use of as a store and byre. The wheelpit is at the rear of the mill, and the remains of a breastshot wheel with wooden axle and cast iron rims can be seen. The wheel had a diameter of 16 feet (4.9 m) and was 5 feet (1.5 m) wide. The only present industry on the mill section of the river is a modern trout farm on the site of the former Torhouse grain mill. It was opened in the 1970s.

Past these mills the river runs through Cotland and Kirwaugh Plantations. The scenery at this point is described by Samuel Robinson as being the finest along the fifteen-mile (24 km) extent of the river's course. After all these plantations the river descends to a large pool called Linghoor, which has been known since the 18th century as one of Scotland's finest salmon pools.

The buildings which were formerly part of Bladnoch Creamery stand on the south side of the river near the old ford. From this place the river flows in several wide curves until it passes Wigtown harbour. From there it flows into Wigtown Bay.

== See also ==
- Bladnoch Distillery
