= Kirkinner =

Village in Dumfries and Galloway, Scotland

Coordinates: 54.8167°N 4.4500°W

- Location within Dumfries and Galloway
- Council area: Dumfries and Galloway
- Lieutenancy area: Wigtown
- Country: Scotland
- Sovereign state: United Kingdom
- Post town: NEWTON STEWART
- Postcode district: DG8
- Dialling code: 01988
- Police: Scotland
- Fire: Scottish
- Ambulance: Scottish
- UK Parliament: Dumfries & Galloway
- Scottish Parliament: Galloway and Upper Nithsdale

Kirkinner (Scottish Gaelic: Cille Chainneir, IPA: [ˈkʲʰiʎə ˈxaɲɪɾʲ]) is a village in the Machars, in the historical county of Wigtownshire in Dumfries and Galloway, Scotland. About 3 miles (4.8 km) southwest of Wigtown, it is bounded on the east by the bay of Wigtown, along which it extends for about three miles, and on the north by the river Bladnoch.

== History ==
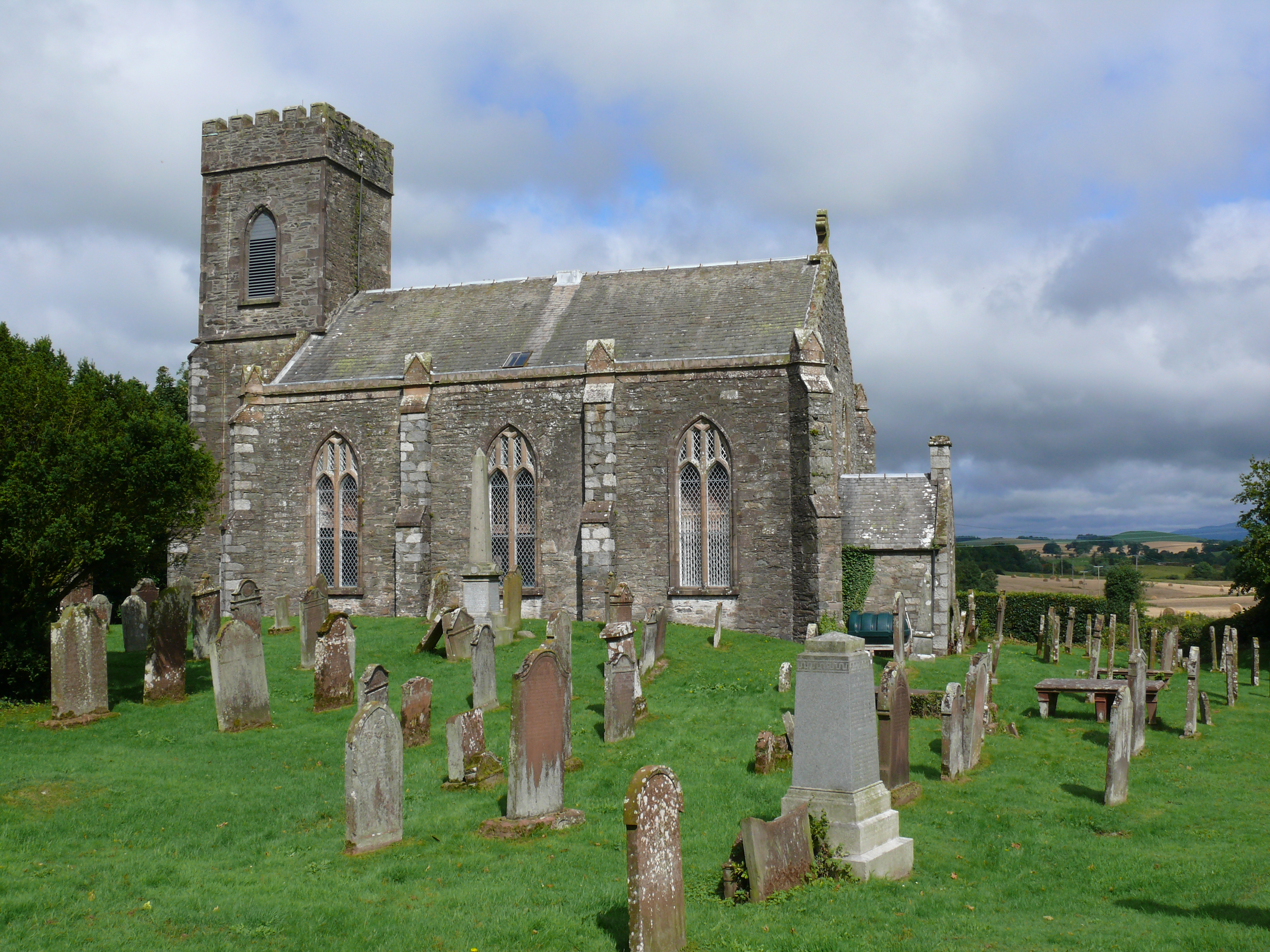
Kirkinner Parish Church built in 1828

There is a "Hill fort, Ring Hill", North Balfern, near Orchardtown Bay.

Doon Hill fort (which is not a dun), Capenoch Croft, west of Barnbarroch, occupies a rocky knoll from which the ground falls away steeply to the E. Around the rim of the knoll there is the remains of a substantial stone wall, enclosing an area some 34.0m NE-SW by 30m transversely. The entrance, 4.0m wide, is in the SW. There is a ditch around the base of the knoll, except on the E, where there are steep slopes. It has been cut through living rock to the E of the entrance, and there are traces of a counterscarp bank on the NW.

On 21 December 1560 there was a Crown Confirmation of Feu Charter of 21 December 1560 by James Doddis prior, Allan Peter, Rolland Tailzeor, John Gibson and Thomas Wryt friars predicatores of the Convent of Wigton with consent of the chapter & of (Brother) John Greirsoun, Provincial of the Order, in augmentation of the Rental etc. & for £1000 Scots, in favour of (Sir) Alexander Stewart of Garroleis (Garlies) elder, & (Dame) Katharine Stewart spouses, conjunctly for their lives and Robert Stewart their son and his lawful heirs male whom failing William Stewart (of Castle Stewart, Penninghame, Wigtownshire ?) brother to the said Robert whom failing Anthony Stewart also their brother, of the following lands and annual rents, ecclesiastical & secular.

Rev. Andrew Simson was minister and the personal friend and parish clergyman of David Dunbar at Kirkinner. He wrote a poem on the morning of the funeral of Janet Dunbar (née Dalrymple) at Kirkinner in 1669 which may have been read at the funeral. Her strange death on the night of her marriage forms the basis of the plot of Walter Scott's The Bride of Lammermoor.

=== St Kennara’s Cross ===
Just off Kirkinner's main street (A746 Whithorn road) stands the parish church of St Kennera (also Cinnera or Cannera). The 19th-century church stands on the site of a 13th-14th-century foundation and perhaps an even earlier monastic cell where lived the 4th-century hermitess, Saint Kennera. The church is now closed for worship, and the 4-foot-high cross-slab dating from the 10th century AD which was once housed inside the church has now been rehoused in a display cabinet outside the village hall, at the side of the main street. On the stone is carved a Celtic style disc-headed cross. The stone slab had apparently stood at the western side of the church for some time before being brought into the church for safety.

=== Parish ===
There are two different Timothy Pont maps c. 1650s showing the Kirkinner area in Wigtownshire. Kirkinner parish can be seen at the National Library of Scotland, John Ainslie map of AD 1782. The parish was sometimes known as Kirkinner and Longcastle parish, the parish of Longcastle having been annexed into Kirkinner in 1650. It was a parish for both civil and religious purposes from the sixteenth century until 1975.

=== 19th and 20th centuries ===
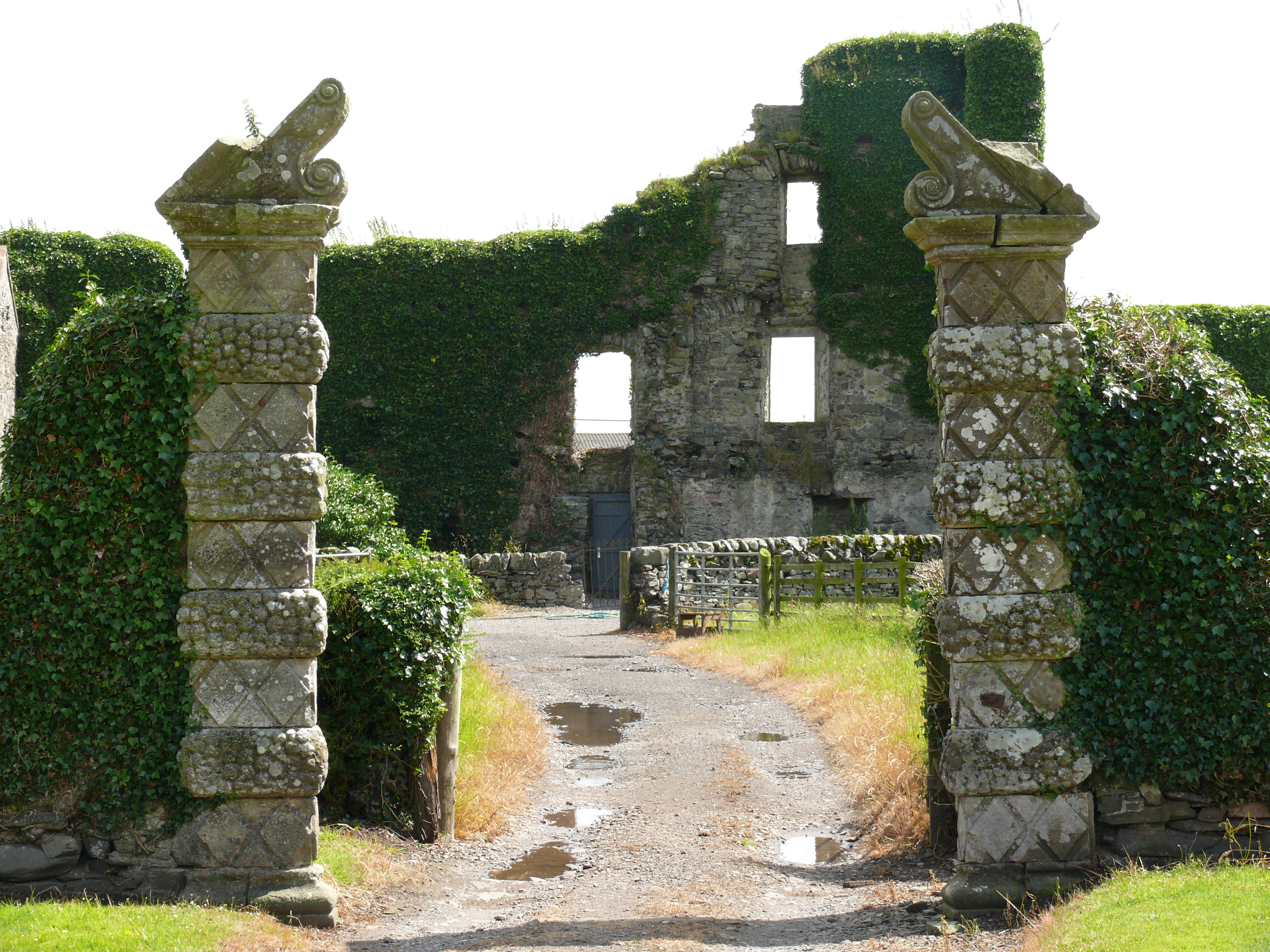
Baldoon Castle

Castelcruick was located at or near Crook of Baldoon, at the end of Shell Road on the opposite side of Lane Burn to Baldoon Castle. Crook of Baldoon has been referred to simply as Crook (1851 census), Cruick (1841 census), Cruik, Creoch, Creochs, Crioch, and Friar's Cruik. According to Around the Parish of Kirkinner, it was part of the Baldoon estate in the 19th century.

The flat carse lands by Bladnoch River were home to a Royal Air Force field of World War II. Lane Burn seems to have been diverted for the Baldoon Airfield, based on comparison of the 1895 and current OS maps.

Kirkinner railway station was located on the Newton Stewart to Whithorn branchline. The station opened on 2 August 1875, closed to passengers on 25 September 1950 and to freight on 5 October 1964.

== See also ==
- List of listed buildings in Kirkinner, Dumfries and Galloway

== Gallery ==
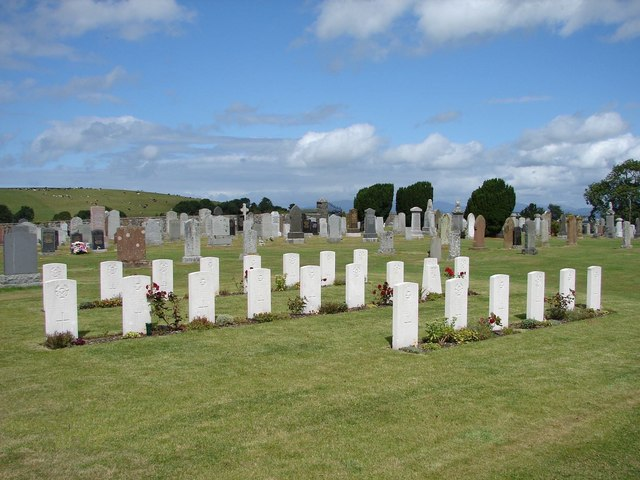
Kirkinner Cemetery - Air Force war graves

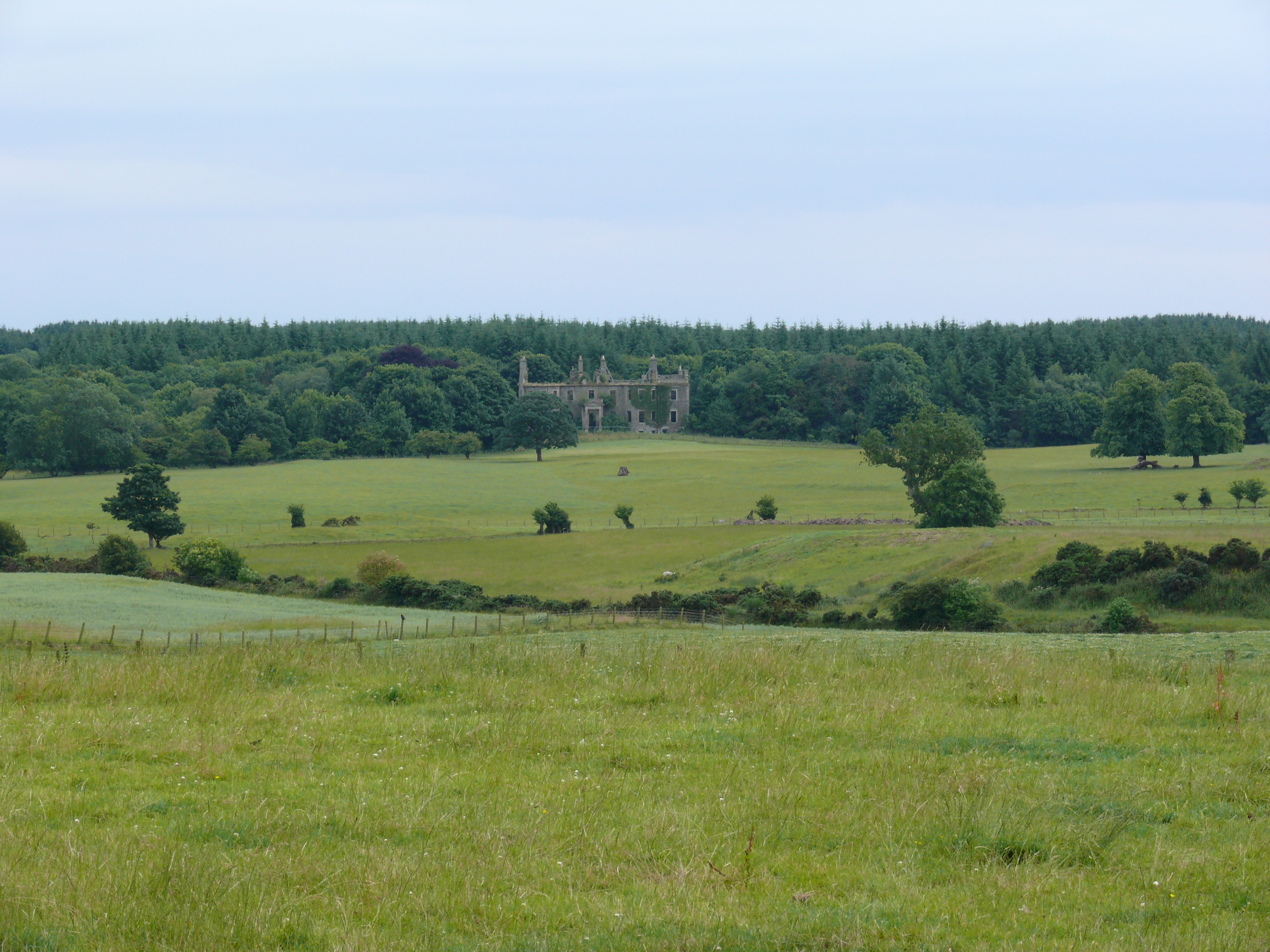
Barnbarroch House

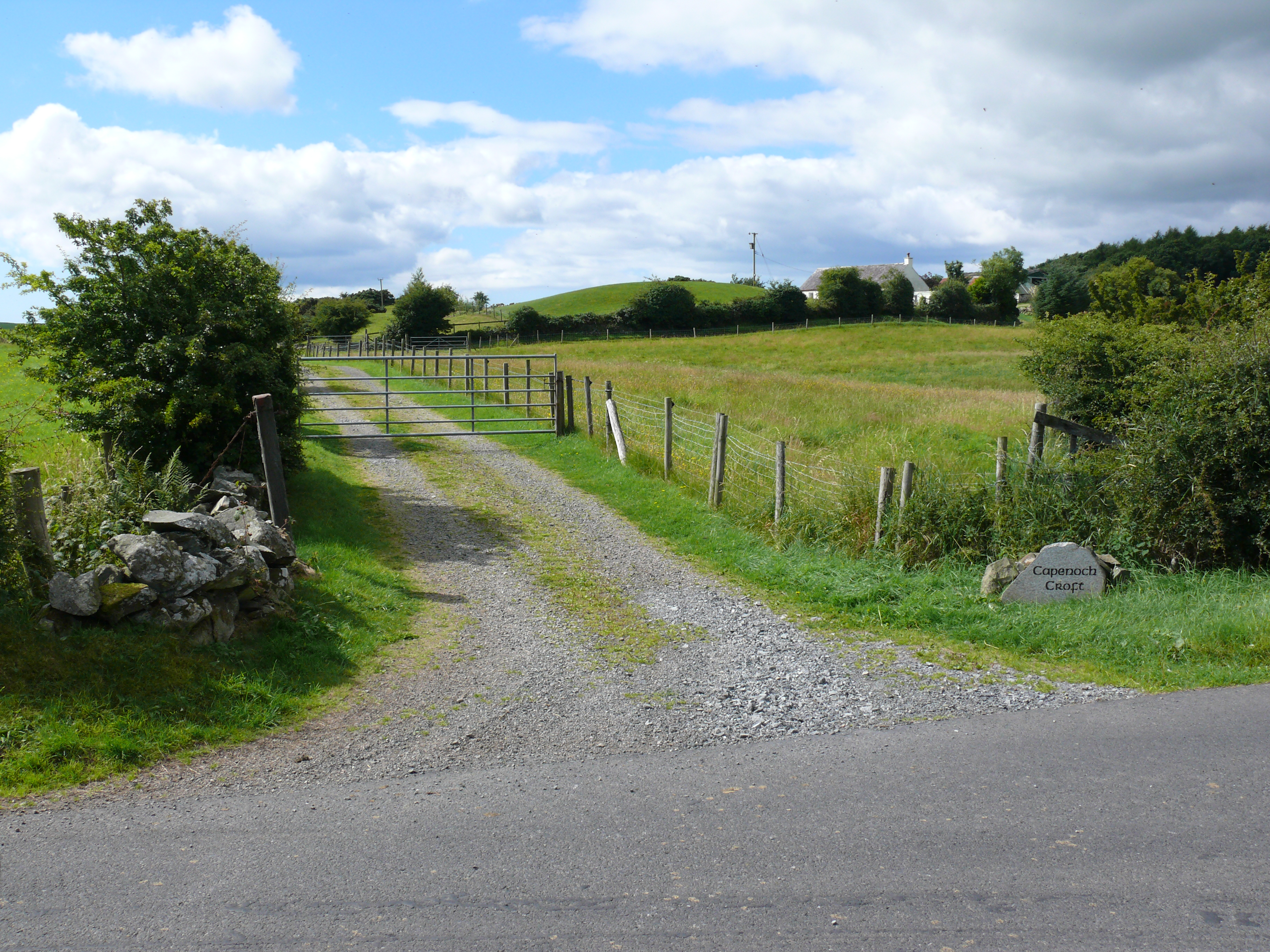
Capenoch Croft near Doon Hill fort

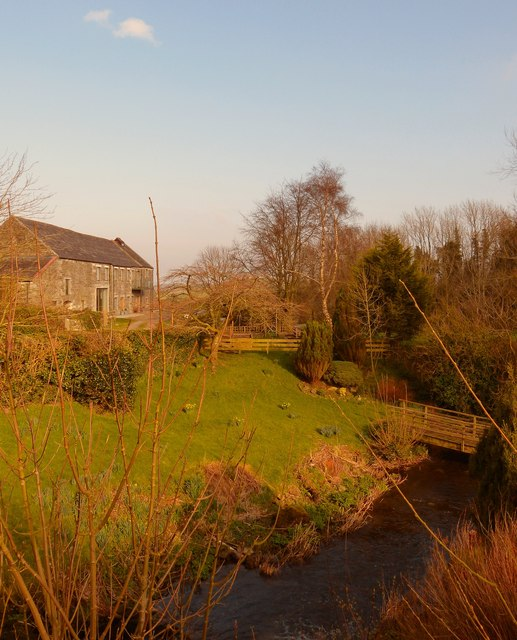
Milldriggan mill, burn and bridge

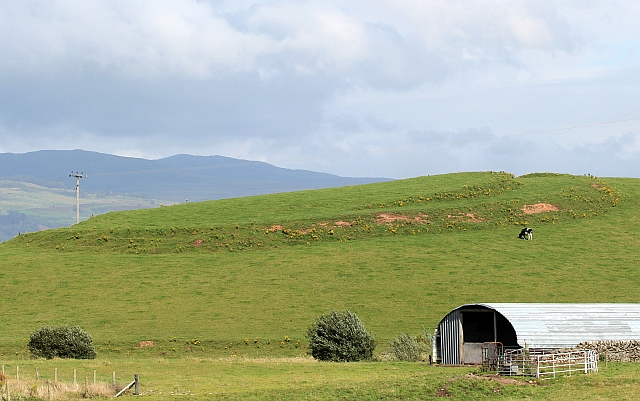
Hill fort, Ring Hill, North Balfern
