= Auchenmalg =

Coordinates: 54°49′57″N 4°45′03″W

Auchenmalg: Scottish Gaelic: Achadh na Meilge
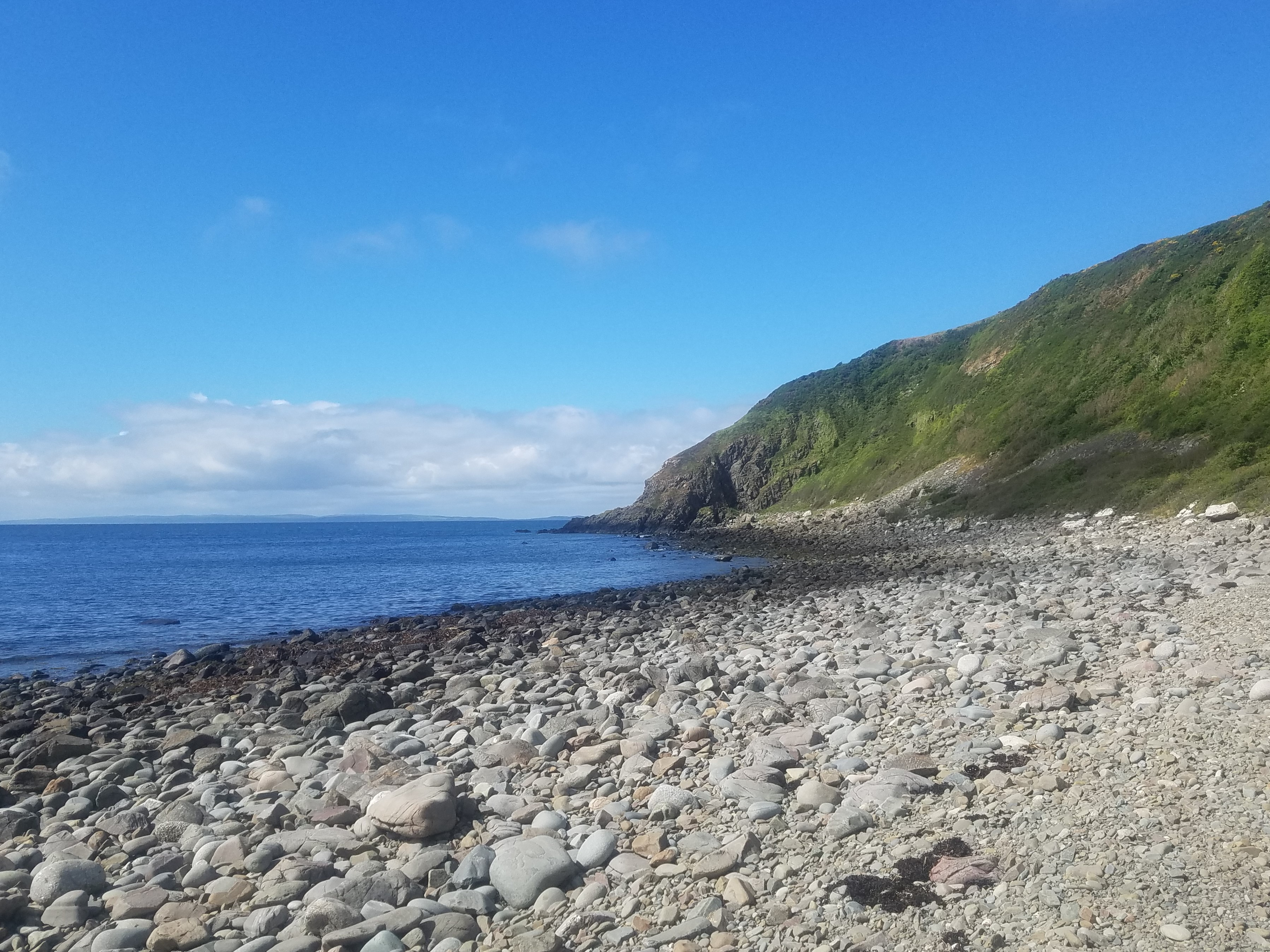
- The view from Auchenmalg beach

- Location within Dumfries and Galloway
- OS grid reference: NX233522
- Council area: Dumfries and Galloway
- Lieutenancy area: Wigtownshire
- Country: Scotland
- Sovereign state: United Kingdom
- Post town: NEWTON STEWART
- Postcode district: DG8
- Police: Scotland
- Fire: Scottish
- Ambulance: Scottish
- UK Parliament: Dumfries and Galloway
- Scottish Parliament: Galloway and West Dumfries

Auchenmalg (Scottish Gaelic: Achadh na Meilge) is a small hamlet situated on the shore of Luce Bay in the parish of Old Luce, Wigtownshire, south-west Scotland. Auchenmalg consists of a village hall, a pub called the Cock Inn, and a caravan park called Luce Bay Holiday Park. The main industries in Auchenmalg are farming and tourism, there is an active dairy farm and the caravan park sits above the beach.

In recent years Auchenmalg has been expanded with the construction of a number of new homes on former agricultural land.

== Archaeology ==
The Scottish Canmore (database) lists numerous sites of archaeological interest in the area of Auchenmalg, these include:

Black Cairn which is not thought to be a cairn but an enclosure that may have contained buildings.

Auchenmalg Bridge Standing Stone which is thought to be a prehistoric stone some 2 metres high in a field that is visible from the road.

Auchenmalg Bay, jetty the remains of a pier or jetty on the shore that was built in stone and is visible at low tide.

Auchenmalg House the ruins of a former manor house in a field and visible from the road.
