= Burrow Head =

Headland in Wigtownshire, Scotland

- Headland
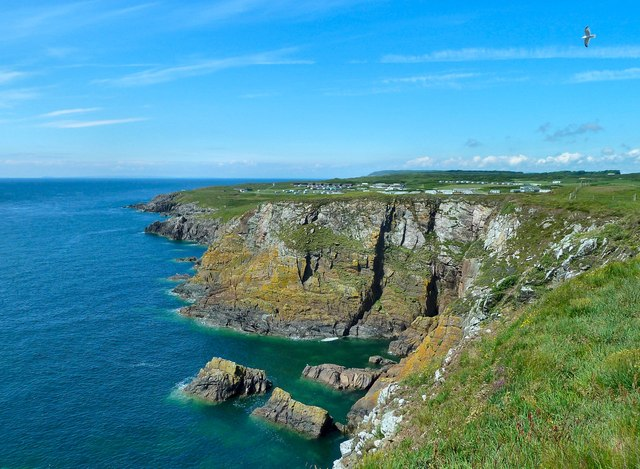

- Location within Scotland
- Coordinates: 54°40′40″N 4°23′37″W
- Location: Wigtownshire, Scotland

Burrow Head is a headland located approximately two miles south-west of Isle of Whithorn, Wigtownshire, Scotland, and is the second southernmost point of Scotland (after the Mull of Galloway).

St. Ninian's Cave is approximately two miles north-west along the coast. It is an important location for pilgrims who believe St. Ninian spent some time on retreat there.

Burrow Head's location and relative seclusion meant that during the eighteenth century it became associated with smuggling, from and to the Isle of Man (fifteen miles south) and Ireland.

In more recent years, Burrow Head became famous as a location for the 1973 thriller film The Wicker Man. Until recently the stumps of the prop used as the wicker man in the film remained visible, but these have been gradually eroded by souvenir hunters.

Today much of Burrow Head is occupied by a caravan park.
