= Tarf Water, Wigtownshire =

River in Dumfries and Galloway, Scotland

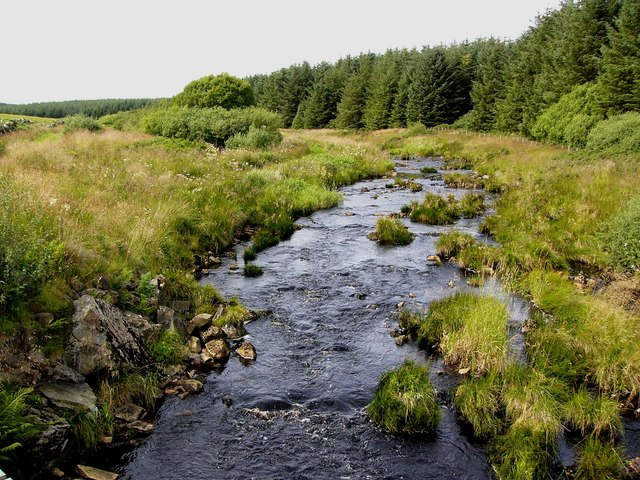
Tarf Water near Kirkcowan

The Tarf Water is a river in the former county of Wigtownshire in south-west Scotland. It rises on the Ayrshire border (55.0048°N 4.7815°W) and flows in a generally southeastward direction to meet the River Bladnoch near the village of Kirkcowan (54.9103°N 4.5792°W). It has no major tributaries but is fed by several burns that drain an area characterised by drumlins and much of which has been afforested.

The name Tarf derives from the Proto-Indo-European root *tauro- 'bull, aurochs'. Bulls occur frequently in Celtic river names, and these names may have had a mythological rather than literal referent. Like other examples of this name in southern Scotland, 'Tarf' is Gaelic in form but is likely to derive in turn from an earlier Cumbric cognate.
