= St Ninian's Cave =

Scottish cave

Coordinates: 54.6938°N 4.4498°W

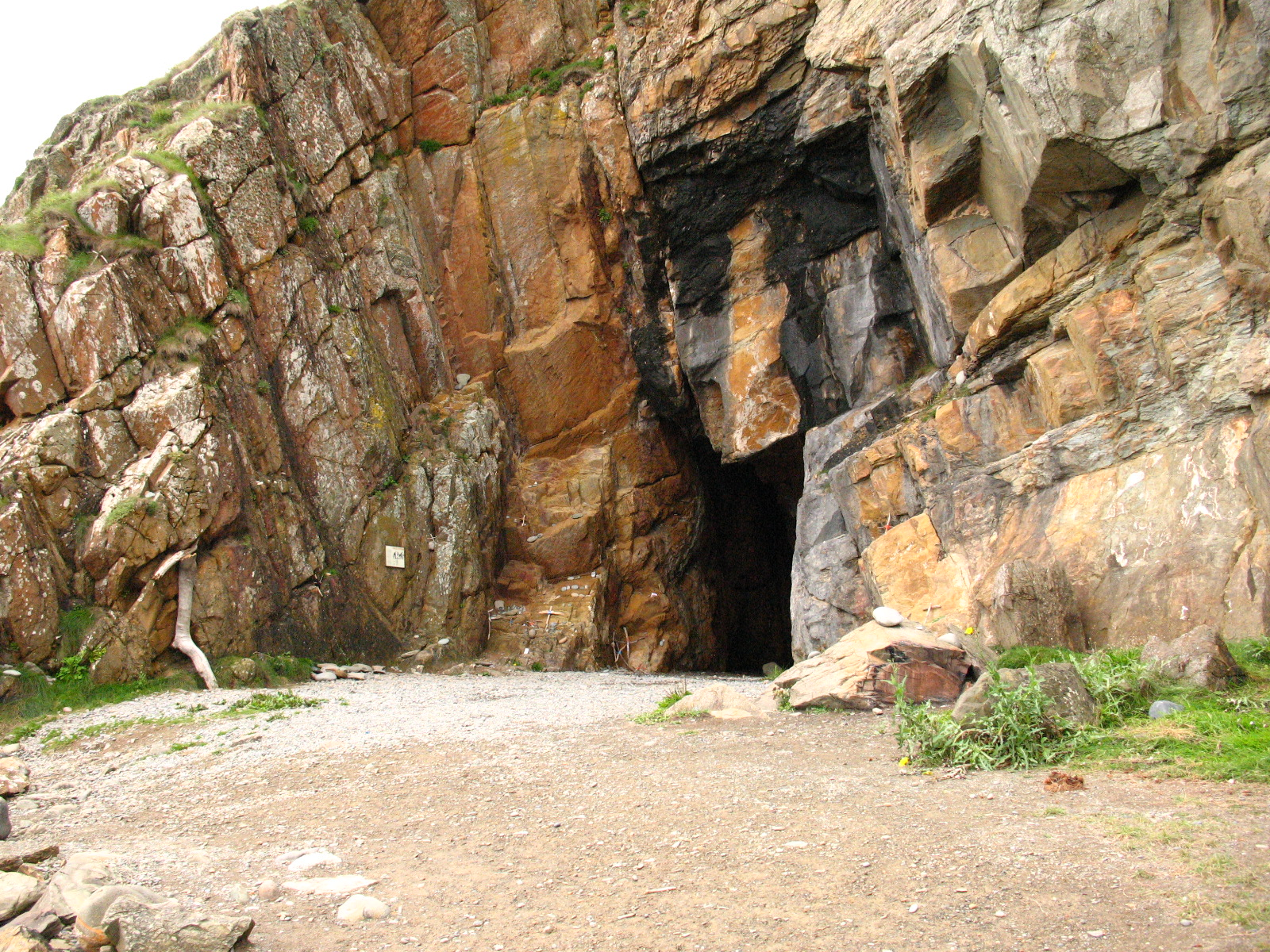
- Entrance of the cave, 2007
- OS grid reference: NX4212935962
- Council area: Dumfries and Galloway
- Lieutenancy area: Wigtown
- Country: Scotland
- Sovereign state: United Kingdom

St Ninian's Cave is a cave in Physgill Glen, Whithorn, Dumfries and Galloway, Scotland. It is a place of Roman Catholic pilgrimage by way of its association with the Scottish saint Ninian.

Excavations in the cave in the 1880s and the 1950s uncovered a collection of early medieval carved stones. There were 18 in total, most of them built into a post-medieval wall, others lying loose in the cave's interior or at its mouth.

Rockfalls near the entrance have diminished the size of the cave over time, as seen at right.

In 1973 the cave was used as a location in the horror film The Wicker Man.

== See also ==
- Burrow Head
