= 1307 =

1307 in various calendars
- Gregorian calendar: 1307; MCCCVII
- Ab urbe condita: 2060
- Armenian calendar: 756; ԹՎ ՉԾԶ
- Assyrian calendar: 6057
- Balinese saka calendar: 1228–1229
- Bengali calendar: 713–714
- Berber calendar: 2257
- English Regnal year: 35 Edw. 1 – 1 Edw. 2
- Buddhist calendar: 1851
- Burmese calendar: 669
- Byzantine calendar: 6815–6816
- Chinese calendar: 丙午年 (Fire Horse); 4004 or 3797 — to — 丁未年 (Fire Goat); 4005 or 3798
- Coptic calendar: 1023–1024
- Discordian calendar: 2473
- Ethiopian calendar: 1299–1300
- Hebrew calendar: 5067–5068
- Hindu calendars
- Vikram Samvat: 1363–1364
- Shaka Samvat: 1228–1229
- Kali Yuga: 4407–4408
- Holocene calendar: 11307
- Igbo calendar: 307–308
- Iranian calendar: 685–686
- Islamic calendar: 706–707
- Japanese calendar: Tokuji 2 (徳治２年)
- Javanese calendar: 1218–1219
- Julian calendar: 1307; MCCCVII
- Korean calendar: 3640
- Minguo calendar: 605 before ROC 民前605年
- Nanakshahi calendar: −161
- Thai solar calendar: 1849–1850
- Tibetan calendar: མེ་ཕོ་རྟ་ལོ་ (male Fire-Horse); 1433 or 1052 or 280 — to — མེ་མོ་ལུག་ལོ་ (female Fire-Sheep); 1434 or 1053 or 281

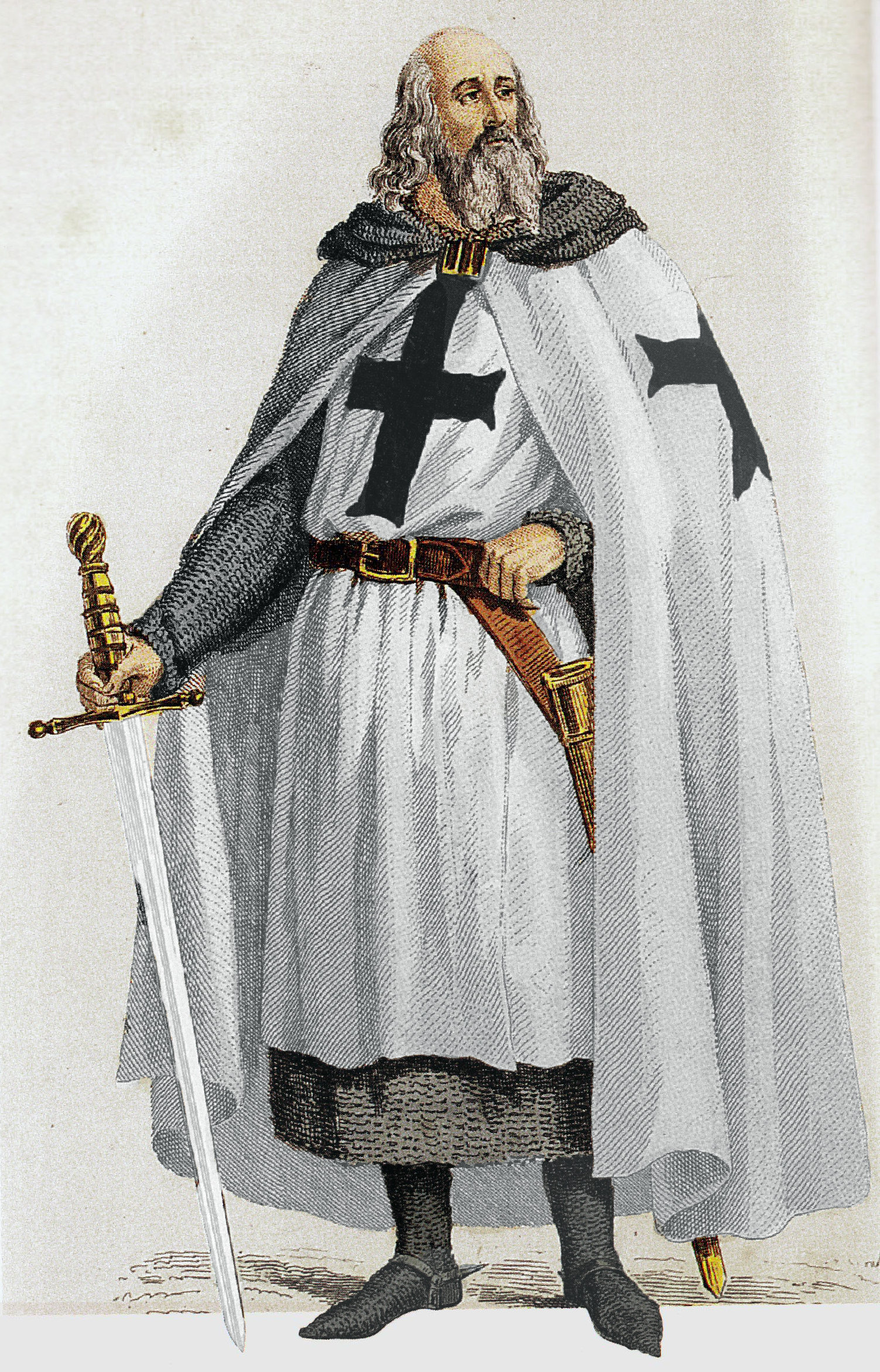
23rd Grand Master Jacques de Molay

Year 1307 (MCCCVII) was a common year starting on Sunday of the Julian calendar.

== Events ==
=== January – March ===
- January 13 – (11th waxing of Tabodwe 668 ME, Burmese calendar) After a reign of almost 20 years, King Wareru, who founded the Martaban Kingdom in what is now southern Myanmar, is stabbed to death by two of his grandsons, Shin Gyi and Shin Nge, who were avenging the execution by Wareru (in 1296 of their father, Tarabya of Pegu. Hkun Law, younger brother of Wareru, becomes the new King of Martaban.
- January 18 – The Tokuji era begins in Japan in the fourth year of Kagen.
- February 9 – Battle of Loch Ryan: Thomas de Brus and Alexander de Brus sail with an invasion force of 1,000 men and 18 galleys, into the harbor at Loch Ryan. But they are defeated by rival Scots under Dungal MacDouall. During the attack, only two galleys escape and all the leaders are captured.
- February 10 – Temür Khan (or Chengzong), the sixth Great Khan of the Mongol Empire (as well as the Emperor Chengzong of Yuan-dynasty China) dies at the age of 41 after a reign of 12 years. He is succeeded by his nephew, Külüg Khan.
- February 17 – Eight days after their capture at Loch Ryan, Thomas de Brus, and Alexander de Brus, Reginald Crawford are all executed. Thomas and Alexander are taken to Carlisle, where hanged, drawn and quartered.
- March 23 – Fra Dolcino of Novara, Margaret of Trent and Longino da Bergamo, leaders of the New Apostles movement in Italy, are captured at Val Sesia and tried for heresy on orders of Pope Clement V. They will be executed on June 1.

=== April – June ===
- April 9 – King Edward I of England dismisses the Parliaments of Ireland. A new Parliament will not be assembled until February 9, 1310.
- April 14 – Persian historian Rashid al-Din Hamadani completes his comprehensive chronicle of Persian history, the Jami' al-tawarikh, inscribing the Persian calendar date "24th day of Farvardin 686"
- April 21 – Ralph Baldock, Bishop of London, becomes the new Lord Chancellor of England upon the death of William Hamilton, but serves for less than four months.
- April – Battle of Glen Trool: Scottish forces led by Robert the Bruce defeat the English army at Glen Trool, Galloway. During the battle, Robert gives the order to push down several boulders to ambush the English, who are approaching through a narrow glen (called the "Steps of Trool"). Scottish forces charge down an extremely steep 700-meter sloop, the narrowness of the defile prevents support from either the front or the rear. Without any room to maneuver, many of the English are killed and routed.
- May 10 – Battle of Loudoun Hill: Scottish forces under Robert the Bruce defeat the English army (some 3,000 men) at Loudoun Hill. During the battle, a frontal charge by the English knights led by Aymer de Valence is halted by Robert's spearmen militia, who effectively slaughtered them as they are on marshy ground. Aymer manages to escape the carnage and flees to the safety of Bothwell Castle. The battle marks the turning point in Robert's struggle to reclaim the independence of Scotland.
- May 13 – Abu Yaqub Yusuf an-Nasr, Marinid ruler of Morocco is assassinated.
- June 21 – The coronation of Külüg Khan as Khan of the Mongol Empire and as Emperor Wuzong of Yuan dynasty China, takes place in Khanbaliq in what is now Beijing.

=== July – September ===
- July 4 – Rudolf I, king of Bohemia, dies.
- July 7 – King Edward I of England, known as Edward Longshanks, dies at Burgh by Sands after a 34-year reign. He is succeeded by his son 23-year-old Edward II, who becomes new ruler of England. After his death Edward's body is embalmed and transported to Waltham Abbey in Essex. Here it lay unburied for several weeks so that people can come and see the body lying in state. After this, Edward is taken to Westminster Abbey for a proper burial on October 28.
- July 20 – King Edward II travels from London, after he is proclaimed king and continues north into Scotland, where he receives homage from his Scottish supporters at Dumfries.
- August 2 – In the first reorganization of the English government by the new King, Edward II, Gilbert Segrave replaces Ralph Baldock as Lord Chancellor
- August 4 – King Edward II abandons the campaign against Scotland and returns home. He recalls his friend and favourite, Piers Gaveston, who is in exile, and makes him Earl of Cornwall, before arranging his marriage to the wealthy 13-year-old Margaret de Clare.
- August 18 – On the question of whether a prayer to the English Bishop Thomas de Cantilupe led to the miracle of the resurrection of William Cragh the day after Cragh's execution by hanging on November 27, 1290, Cragh himself testifies before a papal commission at a hearing in Hereford. Of 38 miracles alleged to have been the result of intercession by Cantilupe, the papal commission finds 12 of them doubtful, but accepts another 26 and recommends canonization. Pope John XXII will formally canonize Bishop Cantilupe on April 17, 1320.
- August 20 – John de Benstede, the English Chancellor of the Exchequer since 1305 when he was appointed by the late King Edward I, is dismissed as by the new and replaced by John Sandale.
- August 22 – Walter Reynolds, Bishop of Worcester, becomes the new Lord High Treasurer for Edward II, replacing Walter Langton, Bishop of Coventry. The next day, Henry Ludgershall is made the new Chamberlain of the Exchequer.
- August 26 – After the restructuring of his government, King Edward II summons his first Parliament, directing members to be elected and to assemble at Northampton on October 13.
- September 5 – Pope Clement V issues a papal bull confirming that the island of Rhodes, now one of the Dodecanese islands of Greece, will be the property of the Knights Hospitaller.
- September 23 – A marriage contract is concluded between the Otto IV, Count of Burgundy and King Philip IV of France for the marriage of Otto's 11-year-old daughter Blanche to the King's 13-year-old son, Prince Charles. The marriage takes place on February 2, 1308, but will be annulled on May 19, 1322, shortly after Prince Charles assumes the throne as King Charles IV.

=== October – December ===
- October 13 – King Philip IV of France orders the arrest of all members of the Knights Templar in France. The Templars, together with their Grand Master Jacques de Molay, are imprisoned, interrogated, and tortured into confessing heresy. In Paris, the king's inquisitors torture some 140 Templars, most of whom eventually make confessions. Many are subjected to "fire torture": their legs are fastened in an iron frame and the soles of their feet are greased with fat or butter. Unable to withstand these tortures, many Templars eventually confess.
- November 17 – The Mongol General Bilarghu hosts the Armenian Kings Hethum II and Leo III at a banquet at his in castle at Anazarbus (now in ruins near the Turkish village of Dilekkaya). After the guests complete the banquet, Bilarghu massacres all of the Armenian royalty and nobles.
- November 18 – William Tell, Swiss mountain climber and marksman, shoots (according to legend) an apple off his son's head with a crossbow at Altdorf, Switzerland.
- November 22 – Following the example of France's King Philip the Fair, Pope Clement V issues a papal decree directing all monarchs of the Christian faith to arrest the Knights Templar and to confiscate their lands as property of the Church.
- December 10 – Theodoric IV, the ruler of the semi-independent states of Lusatia, Osterland and Thuringia, is murdered at Leipzig by Philip of Nassau. Theodoric is succeeded by Frederick the Brave as ruler of Thuringia and by Otto IV of Brandenburg as ruler of Lusatia. The areas are now part of eastern Germany.
- December 25 – On Christmas Day, the 3-day Battle of Slioch begins in Scotland, with King Robert the Bruce and his men turning back the forces of John Comyn.

=== By place ===
==== Europe ====
- Januli I da Corogna seizes the Aegean Island of Sifnos and becomes an autonomous lord, by renouncing his allegiance to the Knights Hospitaller.

==== Britain ====
- Spring – King Robert the Bruce, King of Scots crosses with a small force (some 600 men) from the Isle of Arran in the Firth of Clyde to his earldom of Carrick in Ayrshire. He attacks the English garrison at Turnberry Castle, plundering and destroying the stronghold. Meanwhile, The Black Douglas attacks the English garrison in Douglas Castle at Palm Sunday – while they are slaughtered during a church mass (known as the "Douglas Larder").

==== Asia ====
- Duwa Khan, Mongol ruler of the Chagatai Khanate, dies after a 25-year reign and is succeeded by his son Könchek (until 1308).

=== By topic ===
==== Cities and Towns ====
- The village of Heerle in North Brabant is proclaimed an independent parish (modern Netherlands).

== Births ==
- unknown dates
  - William II (or IV), Count of Hainaut, Dutch nobleman (House of Avesnes) (d. 1345)

== Deaths ==
- January 13 – Wareru, founder of the Martaban Kingdom, assassinated (b. 1253)
- February 10 – Temür Khan (or Chengzong), Mongol emperor
- February 17 – executed:
  - Alexander de Brus (or Bruse), Scottish nobleman (b. 1285)
  - Reginald Crawford, Scottish nobleman, knight and sheriff
  - Thomas de Brus (or Bruse), Scottish nobleman and Dean of Glasgow (b. 1284)
- April 23 – Joan of Acre (or Johanna), English princess (b. 1272)
- May 13 – Abu Yaqub Yusuf an-Nasr, Marinid ruler of Morocco
- July 4 – Rudolf I, German nobleman, knight and king (b. 1282)
- July 7 – Edward I ("Longshanks"), king of England (b. 1239)
- September 21 – Thomas Bitton (or Bytton), English bishop His brother was William of Bitton II, Bishop of Bath from 1267 to 1274.
- October 11 – Catherine I, Latin empress consort (b. 1274)
- November 23 – Diether III, German archbishop (b. 1250)
