= Malcolm MacQuillan =

Malcolm MacQuillan (died 9/10 February 1307) was a 13th–14th century nobleman.

In July 1300, Malcolm was granted safe conduct by the English so he could assail Scottish forces, on Scotland's western seaboard, with his galley fleet.

As part of Robert de Brus's 1307 expedition into Annandale and Galloway, led by Alexander de Brus and Thomas de Brus, an Irish sub king, Sir Reginald de Crawford and Malcolm, consisting of 1000 men and eighteen galleys they sailed into Loch Ryan and landed near Stranraer. The invasion force was quickly overwhelmed by local forces, led by Dungal MacDouall, who was a supporter of the Balliols, Comyns and King Edward I of England with only two galleys escaping. Malcolm was captured and summarily executed with the Irish sub king. Alexander, Thomas and Reginald de Crawford were sent as prisoners to Carlisle, England, where they were executed. The heads of MacQuillan and two Irish chiefs were sent to King Edward I.
