= Stranraer =

Town in Dumfries and Galloway, Scotland

Coordinates: 54.902°N 5.027°W

Stranraer: Scottish Gaelic: An t-Sròn Reamhar; Scots: Stranrawer
- Town and sea port
- Stranraer Harbour in 2021

- Location within Dumfries and Galloway
- Population: 9,751 (2022)
- OS grid reference: NX059606
  - Edinburgh: 102 mi (164 km)
  - London: 310 mi (499 km)
- Council area: Dumfries and Galloway
- Lieutenancy area: Wigtown
- Country: Scotland
- Sovereign state: United Kingdom
- Post town: STRANRAER
- Postcode district: DG9
- Dialling code: 01776
- Police: Scotland
- Fire: Scottish
- Ambulance: Scottish
- UK Parliament: Dumfries and Galloway
- Scottish Parliament: Galloway and West Dumfries

Stranraer (Scottish Gaelic: An t-Sròn Reamhar [ən̪ˠˌt̪ʰɾɔːn ˈɾãũ.əɾ]; Scots: Stranrawer), also known as the Toon or the Cleyhole, is a town in Dumfries and Galloway, Scotland, on Loch Ryan and the northern side of the isthmus joining the Rhins of Galloway to the mainland. Stranraer is Dumfries and Galloway's second-largest town, with a population of 9,751 in 2022.

Stranraer is the administrative centre for the Wigtownshire area of Dumfries and Galloway. It was formerly a ferry port, connecting Scotland with Belfast and Larne in Northern Ireland; the service was transferred to nearby Cairnryan in 2011. It lies 87 miles (140 km) south-west of Glasgow, 52 miles (84 km) south-west of Ayr and 72 miles (116 km) west of Dumfries.

The town's English name comes from its Scottish Gaelic counterpart An t-Sròn Reamhar, meaning "the broad headland" or "the fat nose".

== History ==
=== Loch Ryan battle ===
The Battle of Loch Ryan was fought near Stranraer on 9/10 February 1307 during the Scottish Wars of Independence. King Robert I of Scotland's invasion of his ancestral lands in Annandale and Carrick began in 1307. The Annandale and Galloway invasion force was led by his brothers Alexander de Brus and Thomas de Brus, Malcolm McQuillan, Lord of Kintyre, an Irish sub-king and Sir Reginald de Crawford. The force consisted of 1,000 men and 18 galleys. They sailed into Loch Ryan and landed near Stranraer.

The invasion force was quickly overwhelmed by local forces, led by Dungal MacDouall, who was a supporter of the Balliols, Comyns and King Edward I of England, and only two galleys escaped. All the leaders were captured. MacDouall summarily executed the Irish sub-king and Malcolm McQuillan, Lord of Kintyre. Alexander, Thomas and Reginald de Crawford were sent to Carlisle, England, where they were executed. The heads of McQuillan and two Irish chiefs were sent to King Edward I.

=== Burgh of Barony ===
On 12 November 1595, the Clashant of Stranrawer was named part of Ninian Adair's lands of Barony and, in 1596, was erected into a burgh of barony, the Barony of Kinhilt. This is recorded in the Register of the Great Seal of Scotland. The partial translation into English is:

At Linlithgow, 12 November 1595, the King confirms and for faithful service again dedicates to Ninian Adair of Kinhilt, and the legitimate male heirs of his body, which failing his nearest legitimate male heirs whosoever bear the name and insignia of Adair[, various lands....] In addition, the King creates the village at Clauchane de Stranraer as a free burgh of the barony with a free port, called the Burgh and Port of Stranraer; and the said Ninian etc shall have the authority to appoint a bailiff, treasurer, Dean of Guild, magistrate, burgesses, officials etc; and the burgesses shall have the authority and leave to pack and unpack [meaning the selling of bulk merchandise (wholesale trade) allowed by law only by free men in a free burgh], to buy and sell [also allowed only in a free burgh] etc; [...] and the said Ninian etc shall have authority to hold the position of governor of the said burgh, [...] to hold weekly markets on Saturday, with free (untaxed) market days twice a year, viz Saint Barnabas' day the 11th of June, and at Peter's Imprisonment called Lammas on the 1st of August, [...] and the said Ninian etc shall have authority over all the port customs of the said burgh raised by sea or land among the land tenents of the said burgh and support of the said port; and the said Ninian etc shall have authority to receive resignations of lands of the said burgh etc [i.e. recover his lands from towns people who choose to sell them or give them up]; from those persons whatsoever who chose to dispose of them; the townspeople may meet three times a week on Monday, Wednesday and Friday.

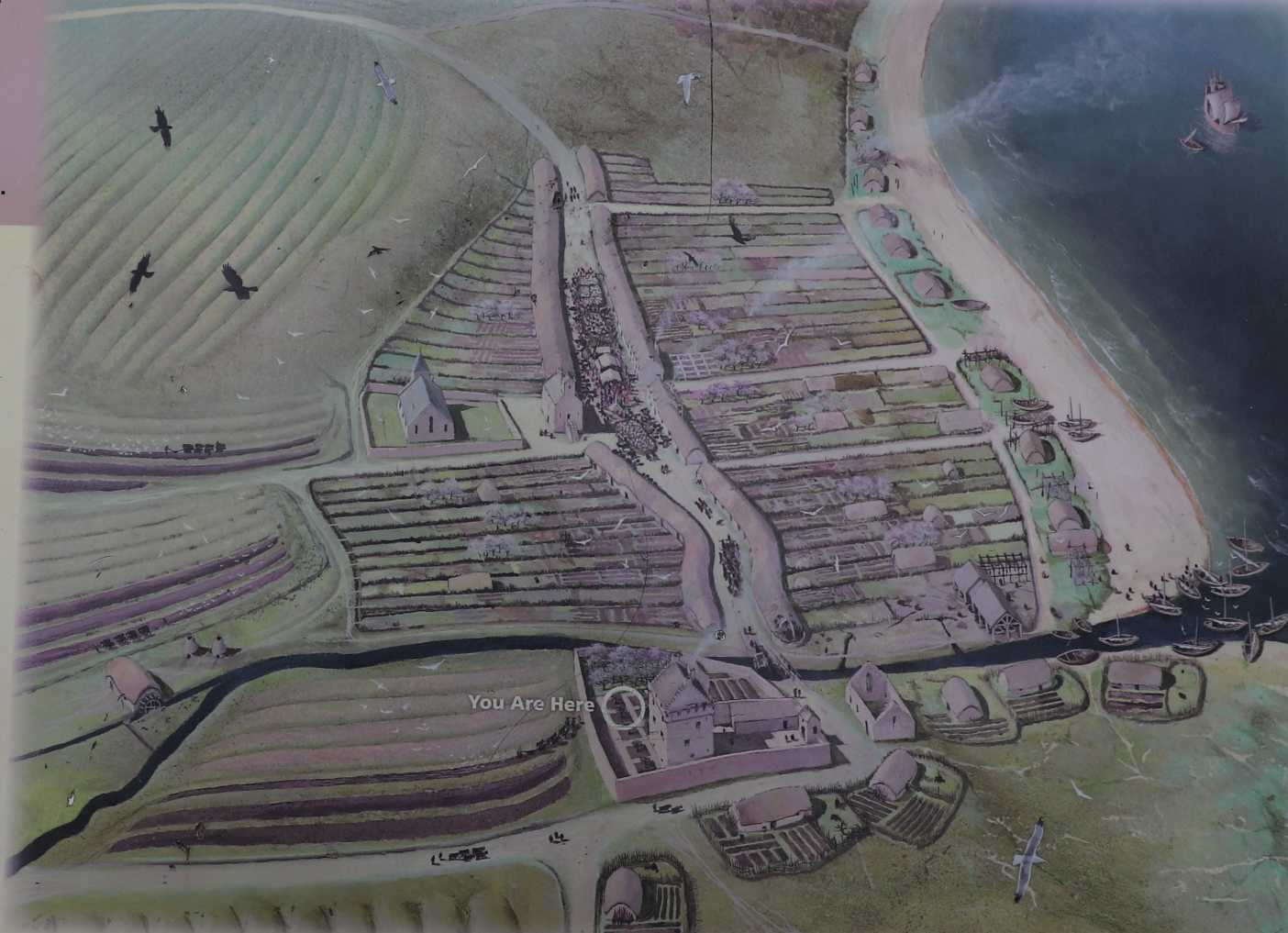
Stranraer during the 1640s

=== Market town ===
By 1600, Stranraer had become the market town for western Wigtownshire. Around this time, Stranraer was reached by a military road built from Dumfries to allow easier access to Portpatrick for transportation of people to Ireland for the Plantation of Ulster. Stranraer became a royal burgh in 1617.

The first harbour in Stranraer was built in the mid-18th century, with further port development in the 1820s. The arrival of the railway from Dumfries in 1861 (closed 1965), giving the shortest journey to/from London, finally established Stranraer as the area's main port. In 1862, the line was extended to serve the harbour directly, and a link to Portpatrick was also opened. In 1877, a rail connection north to Girvan and Glasgow was also established. Stranraer remained the main Scottish port for the Irish ferries for the next 150 years or so. On 31 January 1953, 133 people died when the Princess Victoria sank near Belfast Lough after its car deck was swamped by heavy seas.

=== Recent history ===
Stranraer and its surrounding area saw a significant amount of activity during the Second World War, as it became a focus for anti-U-boat work. Flying boats operated from the area in an attempt to secure the waters of the North Channel and the south western coast of Scotland. Almost all of Britain's shipping imports passed through those two sea areas en route to the Clyde or the Mersey. Indeed, the flying boat Supermarine Stranraer is named after the town. Winston Churchill himself departed from Stranraer in a Boeing Flying Boat on the night of 25 June 1942, when making his second visit of the war to the United States. Churchill also spent time at nearby Knockinaam Lodge during the war years.

Stranraer has an active local history trust, which publishes work on the area's history, commissioned from local authors.

== Economy ==
The main industries in the area are the ferry port, with associated industries, tourism and, more traditionally, farming.

=== Transport ===
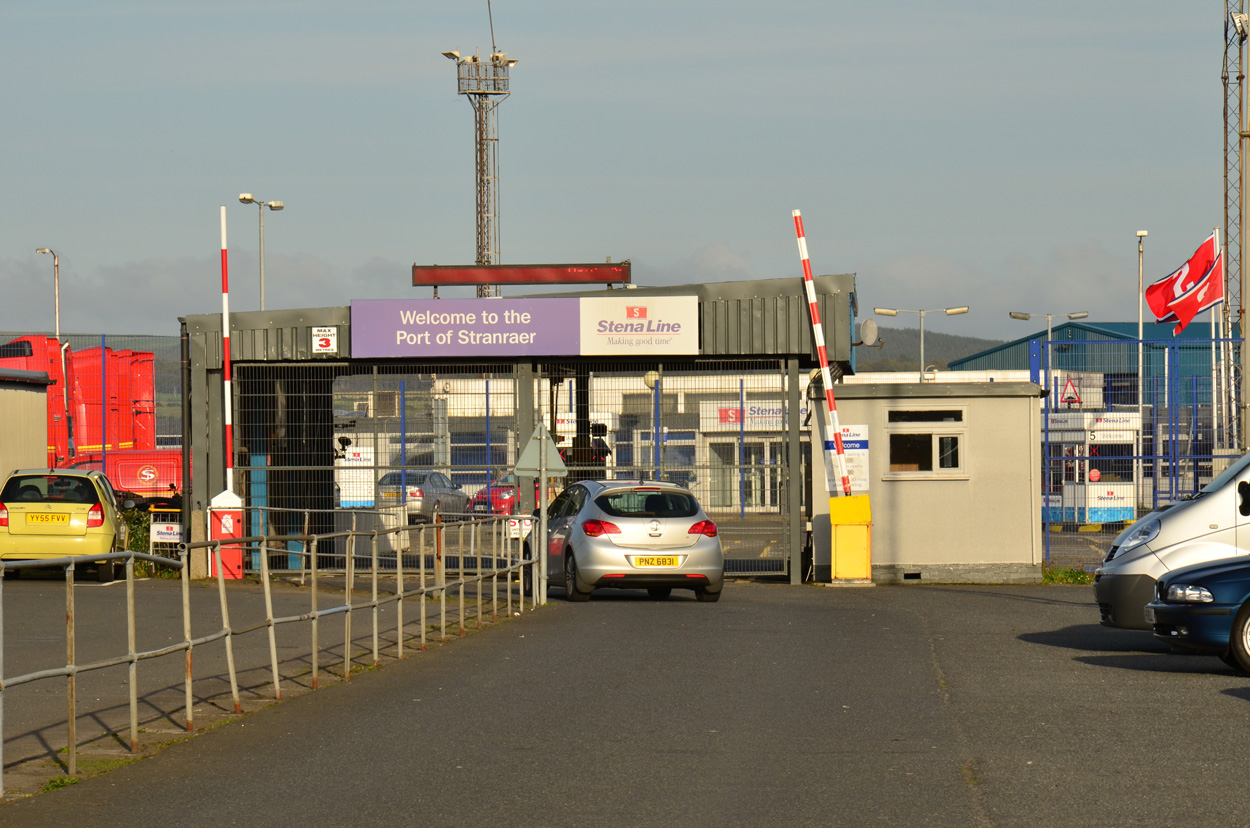
The Port of Stranraer was the main ferry terminal for sailings between Scotland and Northern Ireland

Stranraer railway station is the southern terminus of a branch of the Glasgow South Western Line. ScotRail provides five services per day to Ayr, with one train extending to Kilmarnock and another onto Glasgow Central. Connections to the West Coast Main Line can be made at Glasgow Central or indirectly via Carlisle; Avanti West Coast inter-city services reach London Euston and other destinations such as Manchester Piccadilly, Crewe and Birmingham New Street.

The A77 runs north towards Ayr, Prestwick and Glasgow. The A75 runs east from Stranraer to Gretna, with links to the M6 going to Carlisle. The A75 is part of European route E18, but, like all European routes, it is not signposted as such in the United Kingdom.

Local bus transport in and around the town is provided predominantly by Stagecoach West Scotland, along with local companies including Wigtownshire Community Transport and McCulloch's Coaches. Scottish Citylink operates a service to Glasgow.

Until 2011, the port of Stranraer offered sailings between Scotland and Northern Ireland. In November 2011, Stena Line relocated its ferry services to a new port at Old House Point, north of Cairnryan, which is a few miles north of Stranraer, to cut travel time and fuel costs, and provide a silt-free deep water port to accommodate larger ferries. The existing port in Stranraer may be redeveloped with the departure of Stena Line; proposals to build a transport hub have been made.

=== Redevelopment ===
The European Union was partly financing "The Stranraer and Loch Ryan Waterfront Project" to regenerate the area.

At an estimated cost of £1.29m, the Castle Square development was the first phase of the redevelopment of Stranraer town centre and significantly changed the flow of traffic, with Castle Street and George Street both being narrowed in a bid to be more pedestrian friendly. By January 2010, work on the streets around the town centre was complete, with the streets around the Castle of St John re-paved and re-profiled. The Castle Square was formally unveiled in March 2011 and has so far hosted a range of activities, including music and family events.

Stranraer is currently undergoing redevelopment in the South Central Area (known as Dick's Hill, Ochtrelure and the southern part of Liddesdale Road area into the Gallow Hill).

== Culture ==
=== Historic and notable buildings ===
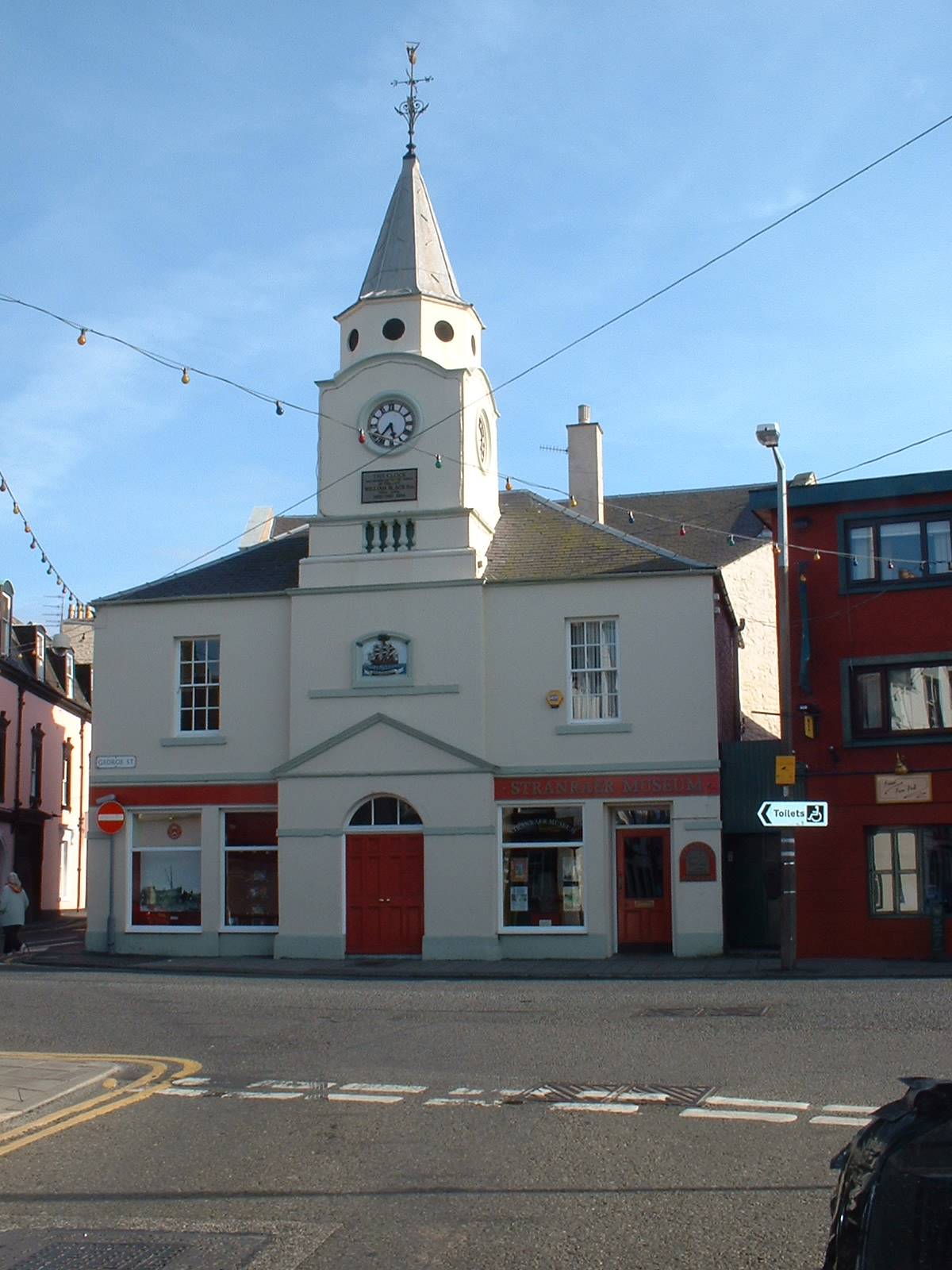
The Old Town Hall, completed in 1777; now occupied by the Stranraer Museum

The Castle of St John is a medieval tower house, built around 1500 by the Adairs of Kilhilt. It has been used as a home, a court, a prison, and a military garrison, the last during the Killing Time in the 1680s. The Old Town Hall, built in 1776, now houses the Stranraer Museum with its displays of Victorian Wigtownshire and the town's polar explorers, Sir John Ross and his nephew James Clark Ross. The town is also home to the North West Castle, built in 1820 and the first hotel in the world with its own indoor curling ice rink.

=== Tourist attractions ===
Other local tourist attractions include:

- Ardwell Gardens – landscape gardens
- Castle Kennedy Gardens – a 75-acre (30 ha) garden between two lochs, noted for its rhododendrons, azaleas and embothriums in the grounds of Lochinch Castle, the seat of the Earls of Stair.
- Glenluce Abbey – a 12th century Cistercian monastery.
- Glenwhan Gardens – a 12-acre (4.9 ha) garden near Dunragit.
- Logan Botanic Garden, near Port Logan village – one of the four sites of the Royal Botanic Garden Edinburgh.
- Mull of Galloway – the most southerly point of Scotland, with a lighthouse, visitor centre and RSPB bird reserve.
- Portpatrick – small fishing town
- The Robert the Bruce Trail begins at Loch Ryan, near Stranraer.
- Southern Upland Way – a 212-mile (341 km) coast-to-coast path between Portpatrick and Cockburnspath.
- Whithorn – with its relics of St Ninian.
- Wigtown – Scotland's national book town.

=== Media ===
Local newspaper the Stranraer and Wigtownshire Free Press is based and was previously printed in the town's St Andrews Street. The Galloway Gazette also covers the town and surrounding area. Local news and television programmes are provided by BBC Scotland and ITV Border. Television signals are received from the local relay transmitter.

Stranraer’s local radio stations are BBC Radio Scotland on 94.1 and Greatest Hits Radio Dumfries & Galloway broadcasts at 96.5 FM in the town.

=== Sport ===
The town is the home of Stranraer F.C., the local semi-professional football team who play at Stair Park. They currently play in Scottish League Two. The rugby team Wigtownshire RFC are based in the town, playing at London Road Playing Fields, opposite Stair Park and are currently in West League Division 2. Also at Stair Park are BMX and skateboarding ramps, and all-weather tennis and netball courts. The town also has a swimming pool (with flume), fitness suite, gymnasium and large sports hall at the council-run Ryan Centre, as well as other football fields, parks and all-weather multi-purpose pitches.

Throughout the years, Stranraer has also been a centre of excellence for Scottish curling. The town boasts the first hotel in the world with an indoor curling ice rink (North West Castle), and was the birthplace of Hammy McMillan, a World Champion curler, and current resident. The town is host to a number of annual curling championships, including the Scottish Ladies Curling Championship and the World Juniors Curling Championship.

In 2019, the Scottish Coastal Rowing world championships, Skiffieworld, was held at Stranraer between 7 and 13 July. Over 50 clubs raced St Ayles Skiffs during the week.

== Demography ==
=== Education ===
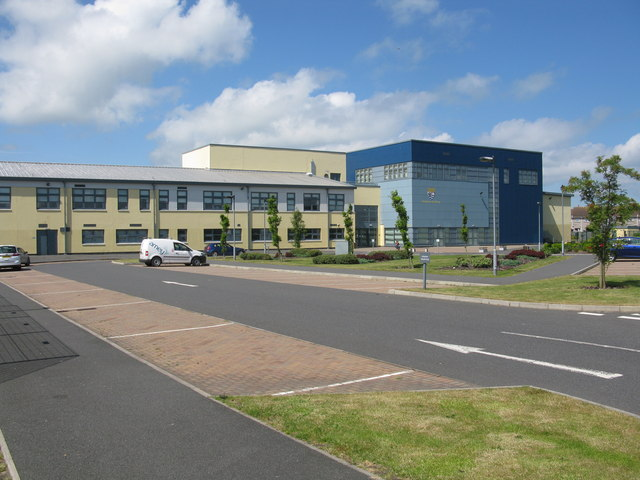
Stranraer Academy is the town's only secondary school

The town of Stranraer has five primary schools: Belmont, Park, Rephad, Sheuchan and St. Joseph's R.C., while villages in the local area usually have their own local school or nursery. The secondary school, Stranraer Academy, is a comprehensive school consisting of one modern building (New Building Phase 2 completed in 2010). The school has around 1,200 pupils, 90 members of staff and serves the area of Stranraer, the Rhins, and parts of the Machars, Wigtownshire. Stranraer Academy has another seven associated primary schools from areas outwith Stranraer: Glenluce, Castle Kennedy, Drummore, Kirkcolm, Leswalt, Sandhead and Portpatrick. The original Stranraer Academy was opened in 1845 on the site of the present Stranraer Campus of Dumfries and Galloway College. In 1965, a new Academy was built alongside a new High School and in 1970 the schools amalgamated.

Dumfries and Galloway College has a campus in the town. In 1990, the John Niven Further Education College was built on Academy Street in the town; it has since been absorbed into the Dumfries and Galloway College.

=== Public services ===
NHS Dumfries and Galloway provides healthcare services in the town. The Galloway Community Hospital opened in 2006; it replaced the town's Garrick and Dalrymple hospitals. GP services are based in the Waverly Medical Centre, adjacent to the new hospital.

The town has several care homes for the elderly, the biggest being Thorneycroft on the edges of the town, run by the Park Homes UK company.

=== Districts ===
- Ailsa Gait
- Ailsa View
- Bishopburn
- Ochtrelure
- Sheuchan Parks / Liddesdale
- Stair
- Stranraer Town
- West End

=== Outer districts ===
- Auchtrelure
- Blackparks
- Culhorn
- Gallowhill
- Inchparks
- Innermessan
- Sandmill
- Soulseat

== Notable people ==
- Vicki Adams (born 1989), Olympic medalist in curling
- Richard Arkless (born 1975), former MP
- David Broadfoot (1899–1953), hero of the 1953 Princess Victoria sinking
- Sir James Caird (1816–1892), agricultural writer and politician
- Colin Calderwood (born 1965), football player and manager
- James Dalrymple, 1st Viscount of Stair (1616–1695), jurist and author of the Institutions of the Laws of Scotland
- John Dalrymple, 1st Earl of Stair (1648–1707) sat as MP for the Burgh of Stranraer in the 1689 Convention Parliament
- Craig Hamilton (born 1979), rugby player
- Thomas Hamilton (1825–1908), recipient of the Victoria Cross
- Ryan Hardie (born 1997), footballer
- Emma Harper (born 1967) MSP
- Leander Starr Jameson (1853–1917), leader of the Jameson Raid, a precursor of the Second Boer War, and Prime Minister of the Cape Colony, and editor of the Wigtownshire Free Press
- Robert William Jameson (1805–1868), author, editor of the Wigtownshire Free Press, and father of Leander Starr Jameson
- Allan Jenkins (born 1981), footballer
- Sir John Noble Kennedy (1893–1970), army officer, author and colonial governor
- William King (born 1959), writer of a number of science fiction and fantasy books most notably in Games Workshop's Warhammer and Warhammer 40,000 series.
- Keith Knox (born 1964), footballer
- Kevin Kyle (born 1981), footballer
- Allan Little (born 1959), BBC foreign correspondent
- John Livingstone (1603–1672), minister banished to Rotterdam
- John Claudius Loudon, landscape gardener and horticultural writer, who laid out the grounds at Castle Kennedy in 1841
- Rory Loy (born 1988), footballer
- Robert McDouall (1774–1848), officer, Napoleonic Wars
- William McFadzean, Baron McFadzean, industrialist and President of the Federation of British Industries
- Hammy McMillan, World Curling Champion, 1999
- Shaun McSkimming, footballer
- James Mavor, economist, economic historian and Professor of Political Economy and Constitutional History at the University of Toronto
- Hugh Nibloe, Wheelchair Curler
- Sir Robert Pringle, Director-General Army Veterinary Corps 1910-1917
- John Rennie, naval architect
- Sir John Ross, polar explorer
- David Speirs, Australian politician
- Dame Leslie Strathie, Chief Executive of HM Revenue and Customs
- Peter Wilson, World Junior Curling champion, 1981
- Vicky Wright, Olympic curler

== Climate ==
Like most of the United Kingdom, Stranraer has an oceanic climate (Köppen: Cfb). The nearest weather station to Stranraer is located at RAF West Freugh, around 5 miles (8 km) to the south of Stranraer.

Climate data for West Freugh (11 m asl, 1991–2020 normals)
Month	Jan	Feb	Mar	Apr	May	Jun	Jul	Aug	Sep	Oct	Nov	Dec	Year
Record high °C (°F)	13.3 (55.9)	14.5 (58.1)	18.0 (64.4)	21.7 (71.1)	26.1 (79.0)	28.5 (83.3)	29.1 (84.4)	27.7 (81.9)	27.1 (80.8)	20.2 (68.4)	16.4 (61.5)	13.7 (56.7)	29.1 (84.4)
Mean daily maximum °C (°F)	7.7 (45.9)	8.0 (46.4)	9.5 (49.1)	11.8 (53.2)	14.8 (58.6)	17.1 (62.8)	18.5 (65.3)	18.4 (65.1)	16.6 (61.9)	13.5 (56.3)	10.3 (50.5)	8.2 (46.8)	12.9 (55.2)
Daily mean °C (°F)	5.0 (41.0)	5.1 (41.2)	6.7 (44.1)	8.0 (46.4)	10.6 (51.1)	13.2 (55.8)	14.7 (58.5)	14.7 (58.5)	13.0 (55.4)	10.2 (50.4)	7.4 (45.3)	5.4 (41.7)	9.5 (49.1)
Mean daily minimum °C (°F)	2.3 (36.1)	2.2 (36.0)	2.8 (37.0)	4.2 (39.6)	6.4 (43.5)	9.2 (48.6)	10.9 (51.6)	10.9 (51.6)	9.4 (48.9)	6.9 (44.4)	4.4 (39.9)	2.5 (36.5)	6.0 (42.8)
Record low °C (°F)	−9.7 (14.5)	−8.8 (16.2)	−9.5 (14.9)	−6.2 (20.8)	−2.6 (27.3)	−1.6 (29.1)	2.6 (36.7)	0.9 (33.6)	−2.2 (28.0)	−5.2 (22.6)	−8.2 (17.2)	−13.5 (7.7)	−13.5 (7.7)
Average precipitation mm (inches)	104.2 (4.10)	84.1 (3.31)	81.1 (3.19)	65.5 (2.58)	61.5 (2.42)	70.3 (2.77)	81.9 (3.22)	87.7 (3.45)	87.2 (3.43)	130.7 (5.15)	126.8 (4.99)	120.0 (4.72)	1,100.9 (43.34)
Average precipitation days (≥ 1.0 mm)	15.9	13.5	13.3	12.1	10.9	11.3	12.4	13.5	12.5	16.0	17.3	16.1	164.8
Mean monthly sunshine hours	56.9	80.2	115.2	169.9	226.0	185.5	189.1	186.0	139.9	101.1	61.1	53.6	1,564.4
Source 1: Met Office
Source 2: Starlings Roost Weather

== Gallery ==
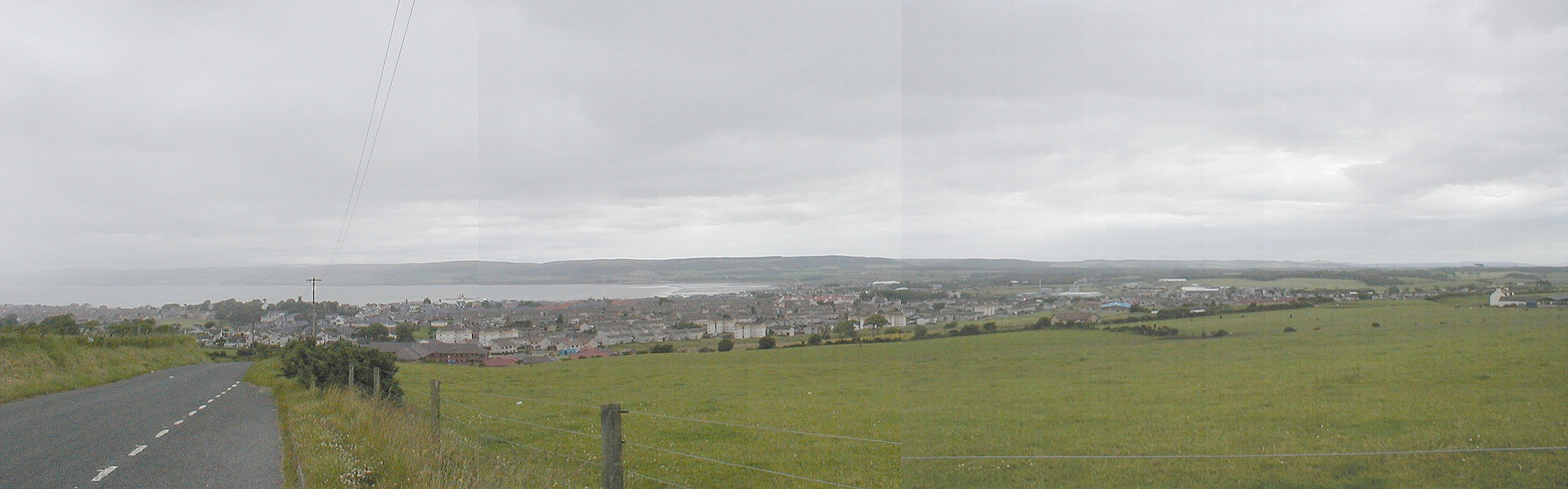
Panoramic view of Stranraer, as viewed from Gallowhill

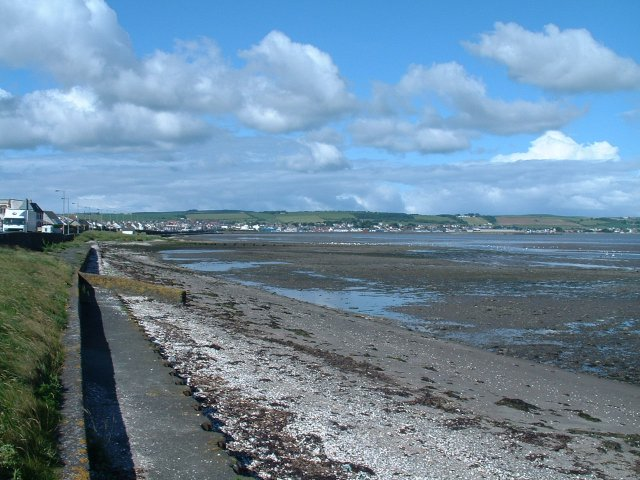
Stranraer and the shores of Loch Ryan, viewed from north-east end of town

Part of the Dick's Hill area taken from the Gallowhill area 2008

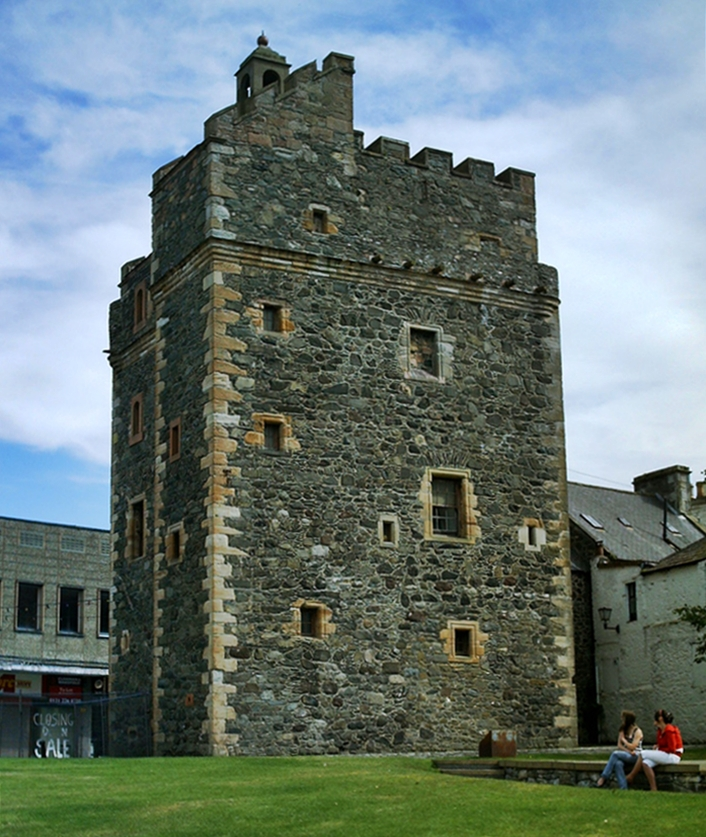
Stranraer Castle (Castle of St John)

Dumfries and Galloway College's Stranraer Campus, 2008

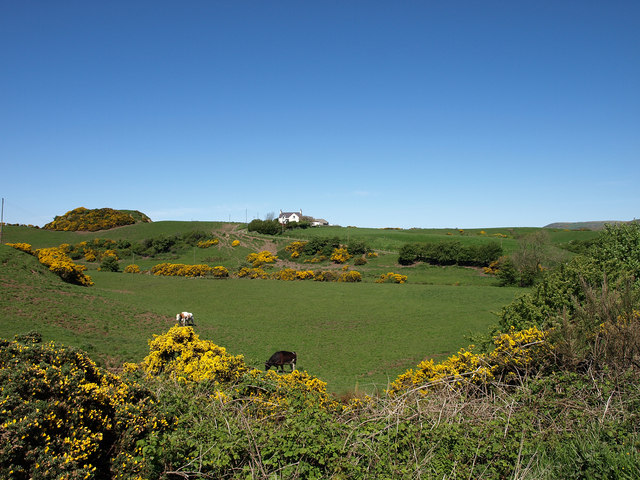
Innermessan, near Stranraer.

== See also ==
- Wigtownshire
