= Battle of Loudoun Hill =

1307 battle fought by Robert the Bruce

- Part of First War of Scottish Independence
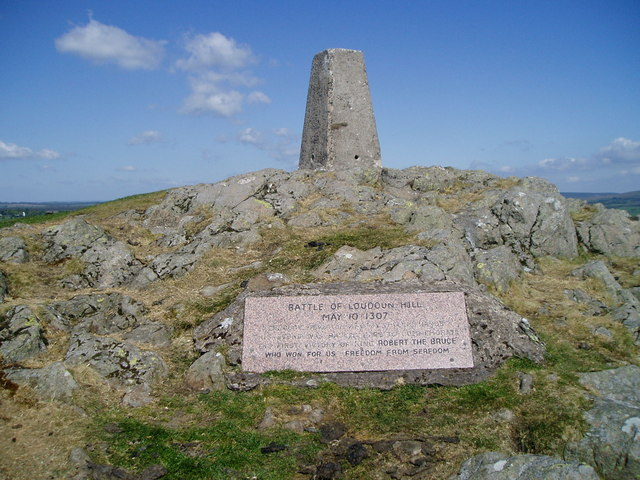
- Trig Point and Battle Plaque at the summit of Loudoun Hill. Battle of Loudoun Hill, May 10, 1307, Through devotion and by willing hands this stone was hauled here to commemorate the first victory of King Robert the Bruce who won for us freedom from serfdom
Date	10 May 1307
Location	Loudoun Hill, Ayrshire, Scotland 55°36′33″N 4°12′38″W
Result	Scottish victory

Belligerents
Kingdom of Scotland	Kingdom of England

Commanders and leaders
Robert the Bruce	Earl of Pembroke

Strength
600 men	3,000 men

Casualties and losses
Low	"Hundreds"

Registered battlefield
- Designated: 14 December 2012
- Reference no.: BTL36
- Location within Scotland

The Battle of Loudoun Hill was fought on 10 May 1307, between a Scots force led by King Robert the Bruce and the English commanded by Aymer de Valence, Earl of Pembroke. It took place beneath Loudoun Hill, in Ayrshire, and ended in a victory for King Robert. It was the king's first major military victory.

The battlefield was added to the Inventory of Historic Battlefields in Scotland in 2012.

== Royal fugitive ==
King Robert the Bruce and Valence had first met in combat the previous year at the Battle of Methven just outside Perth where Valence's night time surprise attack had brought the king to the edge of disaster. Robert's army virtually disintegrated under Valence's rapid onslaught, with many of the king's leading supporters falling in battle or being executed as prisoners. What was left of his force was mauled for a second time soon after this by the Macdougalls of Lorn, allies of the English, at the Battle of Dalrigh. As an organized military force the army of Scotland ceased to exist, and the king was forced to flee and live as a fugitive.

For a time he took refuge in Dunaverty Castle near the Mull of Kintyre, but with his enemies closing in once more, he sought refuge on Rathlin Island near the coast of Ulster, according to some, and the Orkney Isles, according to others.

== King Robert the Bruce returns ==
In February 1307 King Robert crossed from the island of Arran in the Firth of Clyde to his own earldom of Carrick, in Ayrshire, landing near Turnberry, where he knew the local people would be sympathetic, but where all the strongholds were held by the English. He attacked the town of Turnberry where many English soldiers were garrisoned inflicting many deaths and gaining a substantial amount of loot. A similar landing by his brothers Thomas and Alexander in Galloway met with disaster on the shores of Loch Ryan at the hands of Dungal MacDouall, the principal Balliol adherent in the region. Thomas and Alexander's army of Irish and Islemen was destroyed, and they were sent as captives to Carlisle, where they were later executed on the orders of Edward I. King Robert established himself in the hill country of Carrick and Galloway.

King Robert had learned well the sharp lesson delivered at Methven: never again would he allow himself to be trapped by a stronger enemy. His greatest weapon was his intimate knowledge of the Scottish countryside, which he used to his advantage. As well as making good use of the country's natural defenses, he made sure that his force was as mobile as possible. King Robert was now fully aware that he could rarely expect to get the better of the English in open battle. His army was often weak in numbers and ill-equipped. It would be best used in small hit-and-run raids, allowing the best use of limited resources. He would keep the initiative and prevent the enemy from bringing his superior strength to bear. Whenever possible, crops would be destroyed and livestock removed from the path of the enemy's advance, denying him fresh supplies and fodder for the heavy war horses. Most important of all, King Robert recognized the seasonal nature of English invasions, which swept over the country like summer tides, only to withdraw before the onset of winter.

== Loudoun Hill ==
Map of Battle of Loudoun Hill

King Robert won his first small success at Glen Trool, where he ambushed an English force led by Aymer de Valence, attacking from above with boulders and archers and driving them off with heavy losses. He then passed through the moors by Dalmellington to Muirkirk, appearing in the north of Ayrshire in early May, where his army was strengthened by fresh recruits. Here he soon encountered Aymer de Valence, commanding the main English force in the area. In preparing to meet him he took up a position on 10 May on a plain south of Loudoun Hill, some 500 yards wide and bounded on either side by deep morasses.

Bruce scouted the ground and made the necessary preparations. John Barbour describes his actions in his rhyming chronicle:

The king upon the other side,
Whose prudence was his valour's guide,
Rode out to see and chose his ground.
The highway took its course, he found,
Upon a medow, smooth and dry.
But close on either side therby
A bog extended, deep and broad,
That from the highway, where men rode,
Was full a bowshot either side.

The lines in Barbour also indicate that King Robert dug three ditches in front of his men which the English would have to struggle past.

He had three deep ditches made there
For if he could not well prevail at meeting them at the first,
He would have the second under his control,
Or finally the third.

Valence's only approach was over the highway through the bog, where the parallel ditches the king's men dug outwards from the marsh restricted his room for deployment, with the ditches in front of the Scots impeding him still further, effectively neutralizing his advantage in numbers. Valence was forced to attack along a narrowly constricted front upwards towards the waiting enemy spears. It was a battle reminiscent in some ways of Stirling Bridge, with the same 'filtering' effect at work.

The king's men met them at the dyke
So stoutly that the most warlike
And strongest of them fell to the ground.
Then could be heard a dreadful sound
As spears on armour rudely shattered,
And cries and groans the wounded uttered.
For those that first engaged in fight
Battled and fought with all their might.
Their shouts and cries rose loud and clear;
A grievous noise it was to hear.

A frontal charge by the English knights was stopped by the king's spearmen militia, who effectively slaughtered them as they were on unfavorable ground, thus the militia soon defeated the knights. As the king's spearmen pressed downhill on the disorganized knights, they fought with such vigor that the rear ranks of the English began to flee in panic. A hundred or more were killed in the battle, while Aymer de Valence managed to escape the carnage and fled to the safety of Bothwell Castle.

Seven years after the Battle of Loudoun Hill, King Robert defeated another English force under Edward II at the pivotal Battle of Bannockburn.

== Depiction in media ==
The battle serves as the climactic final scene in the 2018 historical film Outlaw King. Robert is depicted as entering a melee with "King" Edward II. In reality, Edward II was never at the battle. Additionally, Edward II would not become king until his father's death on 7 July, portrayed as occurring well before the battle in the film.

== Bibliography ==
- Barbour, John. The Bruce, trans. A. A. H. Duncan, 1964.
- Barrow, G. W. S. Robert Bruce and the Community of the Realm of Scotland, 1976.
- Barron, E. M. The Scottish War of Independence, 1934.
- Traquair, Peter Freedom's Sword
- Oliver, Neil. A History of Scotland, 2009. ISBN 978-0-7538-2663-8.
