= Battle of Loch Ryan =

14th-century battle in Scotland

Coordinates: 54°58′26″N 5°01′48″W

- Part of First War of Scottish Independence
Date	9/10 February 1307
Location	near Stranraer, Scotland
Result	Rebel victory

Belligerents
Scottish Crown	Rebels

Commanders and leaders
Alexander Bruce (executed); Thomas Bruce (executed)	Dungal MacDowall

Strength
~1,000	Unknown

Casualties and losses
Heavy	Low

The Battle of Loch Ryan was fought on 9/10 February 1307 during the Scottish Wars of Independence near Stranraer on Loch Ryan, Galloway.

King Robert I of Scotland's invasion of his ancestral lands in Annandale and Carrick began in 1307. The Annandale and Galloway invasion force was led by his brothers Alexander Bruce and Thomas Bruce, Malcolm McQuillan, Lord of Kintyre, an Irish sub king and Sir Reginald Crawford. The force consisted of 1000 men and eighteen galleys. They sailed into Loch Ryan and landed near Stranraer. The invasion force was quickly overwhelmed by local forces, led by Dungal MacDowall, who was a supporter of the Balliols, Comyns and Edward I of England, and only two galleys escaped. All the leaders were captured. Dungal MacDowall summarily executed the Irish sub king and Malcolm McQuillan, Lord of Kintyre. Alexander, Thomas and Reginald Crawford were sent to Carlisle, where they were executed. The heads of McQuillan and two Irish chiefs were sent to Edward I.
