= Dungal MacDouall =

Scottish nobleman

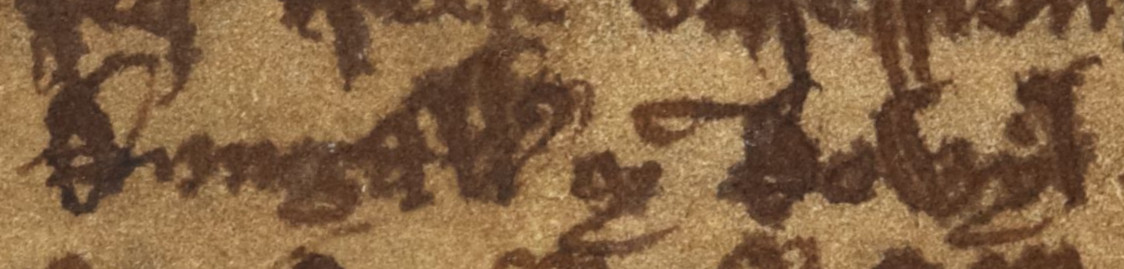
- Dungal's name as it appears on folio 50r of British Library Cotton Julius A VII (the Chronicle of Mann): "Dungalli Mac Dowyl".
- Successor: Duncan MacDouall
- Noble family: MacDouall family
- Spouses: Matilda, Margaret

Dungal MacDouall (died before 1327/1328) was a fourteenth-century Scottish nobleman, and a member of the MacDouall family. (Note: Since the 1990s, academics have accorded Dungal various patronyms in English secondary sources: Dougal Macdouel, Dougal MacDowall, Dougal Macdowall, Dougal McDowell, Douglas Macdowell, Dugald MacDouall, Dugald Macdowall, Duncan MacDougal, Dungal MacDoual, Dungal Macdouall, Dungal MacDouall, Dungal Macdowall, Dungal MacDowall, Dungal Macdowell, Dungal MacDowell, and Dungal McDowell.) He was a vigorous opponent of Robert I, King of Scotland during the First War of Scottish Independence, and was knighted by Edward I, King of England for his services to the English Crown. Dungal was a close associate of John MacDougall, Lord of Argyll, whom he may have regarded as a kinsman. Dungal received grants of lands in England and Ireland after losing his own in Scotland. During his career, Dungal commanded Dumfries Castle and Rushen Castle, and is described by a contemporary record as "Captain of the army of Galloway". Dungal had a large family, and was succeeded by his son, Duncan.

== The MacDoualls ==
Dungal was the head of the MacDouall family, (Note: A certain Dougal MacDouall and a Fergus MacDouall, men who may have been brothers, are reported to have rendered homage to Edward I, King of England in 1296. This submission of the former appears to correspond to an attached seal that bears the name "S'DVNCAL MCD.VIL", and seemingly depicts the image a lion rampant. The coat of arms of a certain Dunkan Makdonell d'Escoce (Makdonell is probably an error for Makdouell) is preserved by the Nativity Roll, an armorial dating to the reign of Edward I, blazoned: Or, three lions rampant sable.) one of the most influential kindreds of Galloway.

The precise location of the MacDoualls' lands are uncertain, although they seem to have been in Wigtownshire, since the fourteenth-century Chronicle of Lanercost reports that Dungal's son, Duncan, raised forces "beyond the Cree" in 1334.

As part of the summer campaign of the English forces in 1303, Robert Bruce VII, Earl of Carrick was ordered to assemble one thousand men from Kyle, Cunningham, and Cumnock; and a further one thousand from Carrick and Galloway. Amongst the men who Robert was working with were Gibbon MacCann, and Dungal himself, who were ordered to assemble two thousand men from Galloway.

In 1306, Robert Bruce asserted his claim to the Scottish throne. In the process he and his rival, John Comyn of Badenoch, argued and Comyn was killed at Grayfriars Church in Dumfries.

Like other native Gallovdian clans, such as the MacCanns and MacCullochs, the MacDoualls were natural opponents of the Bruce cause. Although the MacDoualls and MacCullochs profited in their support of the English, these families came to suffer after Robert's 1306 rise, when he later directed his vengeance against the MacDoualls of Galloway for the cruel deaths of Robert's brothers, Alexander and Thomas, who Dungal turned over to King Edward. Nevertheless, families such as the MacDoualls and MacCanns continued to oppose Robert on behalf of the English king they now fully supported, though they did it from England.

== War with the Bruces ==
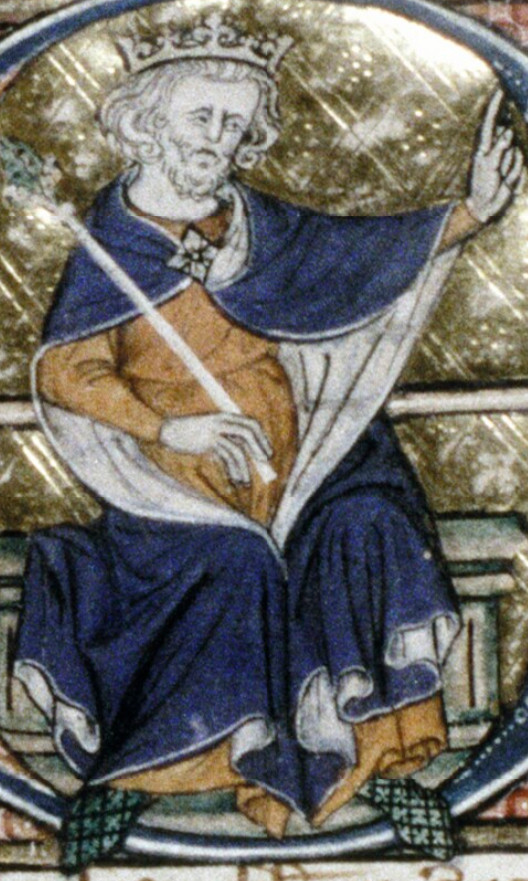
A fourteenth-century illumination of Edward I on folio 9r of Oxford Bodleian Library Rawlinson C 292.

In January 1307, Dungal defeated a force of Bruce supporters who invaded Galloway, landing at Loch Ryan. It is unknown if this strike was a mere maritime raid or the opening stage of a planned mainland campaign. One possibility is that the invading force was intended to divert attention from Robert's own landing. Another possibility is that the invading force was meant to annihilate the MacDoualls and MacCanns—if so, the attackers failed miserably.

According to the Chronicle of Lanercost, the invasion force consisted of eighteen ships, and was led by Thomas Bruce, Alexander Bruce, Reginald Crawford, an unidentified Lord of Kintyre, and an unidentified Irish kinglet. This source reports that Dungal—described as "a chief among the Gallovidians"—defeated the invaders, who are stated to have landed on 9 February. The chronicle further relates that Dungal had the Lord of Kintyre and the Irish kinglet beheaded, and sent their heads to Edward I at Lanercost. Thomas, Alexander, and Reginald, are similarly stated to have been sent to the king and received a traitor's death. According to the fourteenth-century Guisborough Chronicle, the invaders had been "surprised by night".

The continuation of the Paris version of Flores historiarum gives a similar account of Dungal's actions, likewise naming his opponents as Bruce's brothers, Thomas, Alexander, and one Reginald, but differs by assigning the name Malcolm Makaill to the Lord of Kintyre, and notes two Irish chieftains. (Note: There is reason to suspect that Malcolm was a member of the MacQuillan family. The fact that the operation included a Lord of Kintyre and an Irish kinglet is evidence of Robert's links with Ireland, and may lend weight to the identification of Malcolm as a MacQuillan. Malcolm's surname is rendered "Mackayle" and "Makaillis" (which is probably a mistake for Makaill). He may be identical to the Malcolm who was associated with Dunaverty Castle and Robert himself. Although an undated letter from Robert, addressed to "all the kings of Ireland, to the prelates and clergy, and to the inhabitants of all Ireland", could have been composed in the context of a proposed alliance on the eve of the Bruce campaign in Ireland in 1315–1318, there is reason to suspect that it was more likely drawn up in the winter of 1306/1307, on the eve of the ill-fated invasion of Galloway defeated by Dungal.) The fourteenth-century Gesta Annalia II merely relates that Thomas and Alexander were captured at Loch Ryan, and sent to King Edward who beheaded them at Carlisle. (Note: The closest the fourteenth-century Bruce gets to covering the event is the remark that Reginald and Brice Blair were hanged in a barn in Ayr. Brice was probably executed in October 1306. The association between him and Reginald in the Bruce may stem from their apparent part in the taking of Ayr, in support of the Bruce cause, in February 1306. The execution episode presented by the Bruce is probably one of the sources for a somewhat similar story, set at the Barns of Ayr, depicted by the fifteenth-century Wallace.)

The Chronicle of Lanercost states that Thomas, Alexander, and Reginald were executed at Carlisle on 17 February. As a result of his services to the English Crown, the same source further reports that Dungal was knighted by Edward at Carlisle on Easter Day, 26 March 1307. Dungal is elsewhere recorded to have been rewarded with £40 on 3 February 1307 for the taking of Thomas, Alexander, and Reginald. (Note: This record corroborates the chronicle accounts of the taking and execution of the three. Another record, dated 19 February, identifies Dungal as "Captain of the army of Galloway", and reveals that Dungal transported Thomas, Alexander, Reginald, and the heads of "certain traitors from Kintyre and Ireland", to Edward, Prince of Wales at Wetheral. The executions of Thomas and Alexander are also noted by the Guisborough Chronicle.) Edward I is also recorded to have awarded Dungal with a grant of the forfeited lands of Brice Blair, the office of coroner of Ayr, and the lands of the Mark that had been previously held by Robert Boyd.

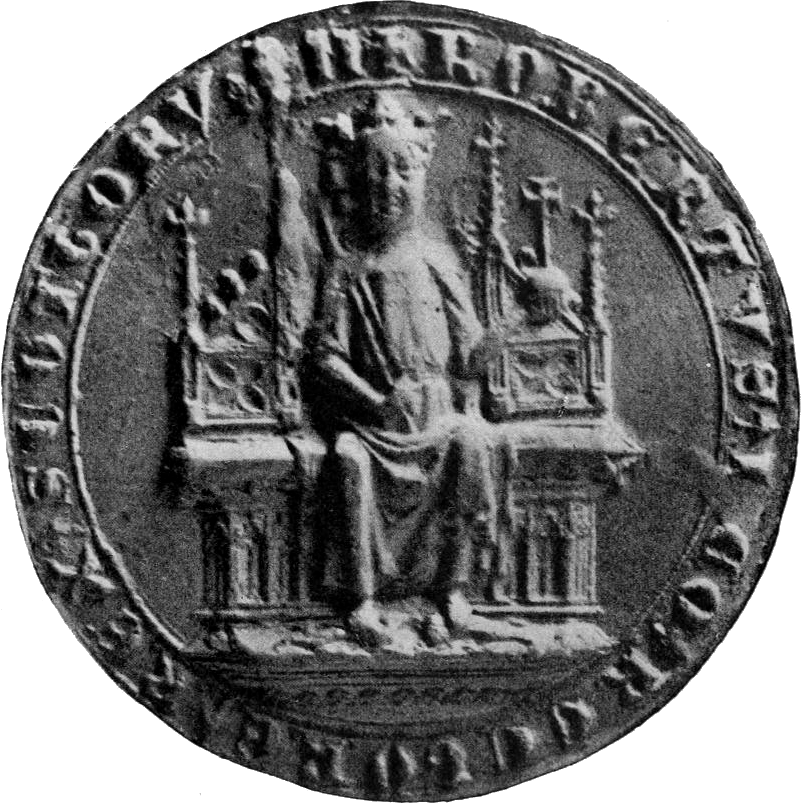
The seal of Robert I.

In 1308, King Robert sent his one remaining brother, Sir Edward Bruce, into Galloway to have their revenge on Dungal MacDouall for the loss of their two brothers. James Douglass went with Sir Edward and they attacked the MacDoualls and their English allies at night, chasing them from Galloway. After that success, King Robert made his brother, Lord of Galloway.

Edward I's remorseless executions of King Robert's brothers (one of whom, Alexander, was a priest), and his supporters may be explained by his disgust at the idea of Scottish independence and Bruce's slaying of John Comyn, an act the English king regarded as sacrilegious. Although chivalrous compassion became fashionable in England in the twelfth century, and spread into Scotland and Wales by the thirteenth century, there was no comparable political transformation in Gaelic Ireland. The Bruces' connections with the Gaelic world may have enabled the English Crown to treat adherents of the Bruces as if they were Irish. In truth, Edward was ruthless and without mercy, even to women and resented any desire for Scotland to be free. Thus, he may have used the Gaelic connection as an excuse. Such a possibility may be exemplified by the battlefield executions doled out by Dungal. (Note: As for the fates of Thomas, Alexander, and Reginald, the fact that Dungal spared them from death on the battlefield—only to hand them over to the English where they received the death of William Wallace—reveals that he was well aware of Edward I's orders: that Robert and his closest supporters were not to be summarily executed.)

In March 1306/1307, on account of his success campaigning in support of the English, Dungal successfully petitioned Edward I to grant his like-named younger brother the marriage of the daughter and heir of Hugh Chaumpaigne. The same month, Dungal is recorded to have successfully requested a pardon for Elias Vaux, for the latter's part in the killing of Nicholas, son of Robert Goyt.

== Further defence of Galloway ==
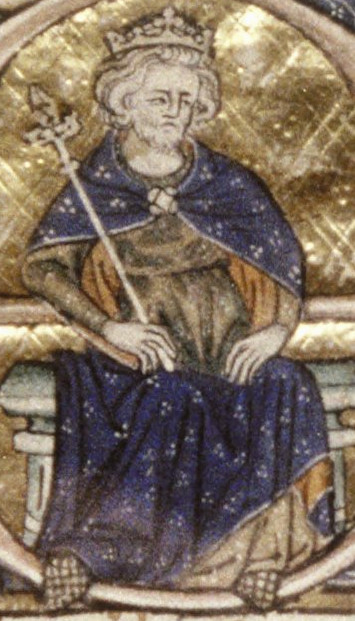
A fourteenth-century illumination of Edward II on folio 105r of Oxford Bodleian Library Rawlinson C 292.

Dungal's actions in support of the English may exemplify the Gallovidians stance against the Bruce cause. As a result of this opposition, Robert oversaw a campaign against the Gallovidians, commanded by his brother, Edward, who was later made Lord of Galloway. (Note: Edward Bruce was certainly Lord of Galloway by the time of the St Andrews Parliament of 1309. Another man present at the parliament appears to have been Donald of Islay.) This operation appears to have been unleashed after the death of Edward I in July, and after the succeeding Edward II concluded a campaign of his own late in August, returning to Carlisle on 1 September. The Bruce campaign is partly evidenced by an English order, dated 25 September, commanding that refugee Gallovidians be allowed to feed their flocks in Inglewood Forest. Five days later, Edward II ordered John, Earl of Richmond to quash the Bruce campaign in Galloway, since several English supporters—namely John St John, Dungal, and Donald MacCann—had alerted the English Crown of the dire situation in the region. (Note: At one point, the Chronicle of Lanercost reports that Robert and Edward Bruce marched on Galloway, where they took tribute from the land on the condition that it would be left in peace. One possibility is that this blackmailing took place in September.)

Midway through 1308, Robert Bruce, then King Robert I, had his revenge on MacDouall when his brother, Sir Edward Bruce, overran Galloway, and in the process drove Dungal and his family out of Scotland. (Note: According to Chronicle of Lanercost, the Gallovidians who could escape the carnage were forced to flee to England.) This campaign seems to be reported by the Chronicle of Lanercost, Gesta Annalia II, and the fourteenth-century Bruce. The final clash in this Gallovidian campaign may have been fought near Buittle, on the banks of the River Dee, rather than the Cree as claimed by the Bruce. Specifically, Gesta Annalia II relates that a certain 'Donald of the Isles' led a host of Gallovidians to the River Dee, where they were defeated by Edward Bruce, and the leader was himself captured. (Note: There are numerous manuscript versions of Gesta Annalia II. One identifies him as 'of Mar', another leaves a blank space after his name, indicating that the scribes were unsure as to the man's identity. According to the Bruce, the English forces were led by Aymer St John and Ingram Umfraville. According to the Chronicle of Lanercost, the leaders of the Bruce forces were Edward Bruce, Alexander Lindsay, Robert Boyd, and James Douglas.) Whilst it is possible that the defeated man mentioned by this source might refer to Donald of Islay, an apparent member of Clan Donald, another possibility is that it instead refers to Dungal himself.

A later account of the battle, preserved by the fifteenth-century Scotichronicon, confusingly identifies 'Donald of the Isles' as leader of the Gallovidian forces, but then includes a verse about the clash in which a 'Donald of Islay' is identified as an ally of Edward Bruce. As such, there is reason to suspect that the Bruce-aligned 'Donald' mentioned by this source is identical to Donald of Islay, and that the Gallovidian-aligned 'Donald' is identical to Donald MacCann, a Gallovidian who consistently supported the English against the Bruces, and who disappears from record at about this point in history. (Note: The account given by Scotichronicon further reports that a knight named Roland, a man who may be identical to the otherwise attested Ronald MacGachan, was killed in the clash. It further relates that an island fortress was captured by Edward's force, and that Donald MacCann was thereby captured. The capture of Donald MacCann may mark the point at which the MacCanns submitted to Robert.)

The account of Edward Bruce's campaigning against the Gallovidians, given by the Chronicle of Lanercost, states that his forces were partly composed of men from the Isles. The evidence of Donald of Islay in league with pro-Bruce forces could indicate that Gesta Annalia II was erroneous in placing him and the Islesmen against Edward Bruce's forces. One possibility is that the account given by Chronicle of Lanercost influenced Gesta Annalia II in its identification of Edward Bruce's foe as from the Isles. (Note: It is well known that Angus Og Macdonald, then Lord of the Isles, supported King Robert Bruce throughout his campaign to claim Scotland and often supplied King Robert with galleys, warriors and galloglass. After the defeat of Dungal MacDouall in 1308, Sir Edward Bruce was named Lord of Galloway by King Robert. Although there may be reason to suspect that the battle took place in the context of the well-attested Gallovidian campaigns of 1307 or 1313, because such a clash in 1308 is not corroborated by administrative sources, the fact that the battle is recounted by sources such as the Chronicle of Lanercost, Gesta Annalia II, the Bruce, and Scotichronicon, appears to affirm its historicity. One possible reason that English records may have overlooked the battle is that it was overshadowed by other events of 1308, such as the loss of Inverurie and the herschip of Buchan.)

== Ejection, territorial grants, constabularies and shrievalties ==
Having been forced from Scotland, Dungal received an order of protection from the English Crown in August 1308, presumably in the context of an attempt to regain his lands. Nevertheless, Dungal's venture appears to have been unsuccessful, and months later he was granted an English manor in compensation. Specifically, in April 1309, Dungal received a royal grant of the Yorkshire manor of Temple-Cowton to sustain himself and his family. The record of his grant is the first time that Dungal is attested as a knight. It was probably an English elevation. Certainly, Dungal is stated to have been "hated by the enemy" for his actions in Scotland.

Prior to 1308, the manor was a possession of the Knights Templar. On 8 February 1311/1312, the manor—then recently taken into royal possession—was ordered by the king to be delivered into the hands of Dungal's wife, Matilda, until Dungal was able to receive it himself.

Whilst serving the king in 1310/1311, Dungal was made constable of Dumfries Castle, and as such served as Sheriff of Dumfries. On 7 February 1312, Dungal was compelled to surrender the castle to Robert's forces. Despite his part in the capture and later execution of the Scottish king's brothers five years earlier, Dungal was allowed to go into exile after giving up the castle. The fall of Dumfries took place in the context of Robert's push to seize several castles in south-western Scotland that were still holding out against him. Of these, Dumfries and Caerlaverock were probably the strongest. The army that forced the surrender of the besieged Dumfries garrison was probably commanded by Edward Bruce and James Douglas.

In correspondence dating to 29 May, Edward II commanded that Dumfries Castle be fortified. In July, Dungal's brother, Fergus, is recorded to have been engaged in supplying the castle with munitions. Later that month, Dungal acknowledged the receipt of certain supplies, although afterwards in August he is reported to have complained to the English Crown that a lack of supplies expected from Carlisle had contributed to the desertion of many of his men.

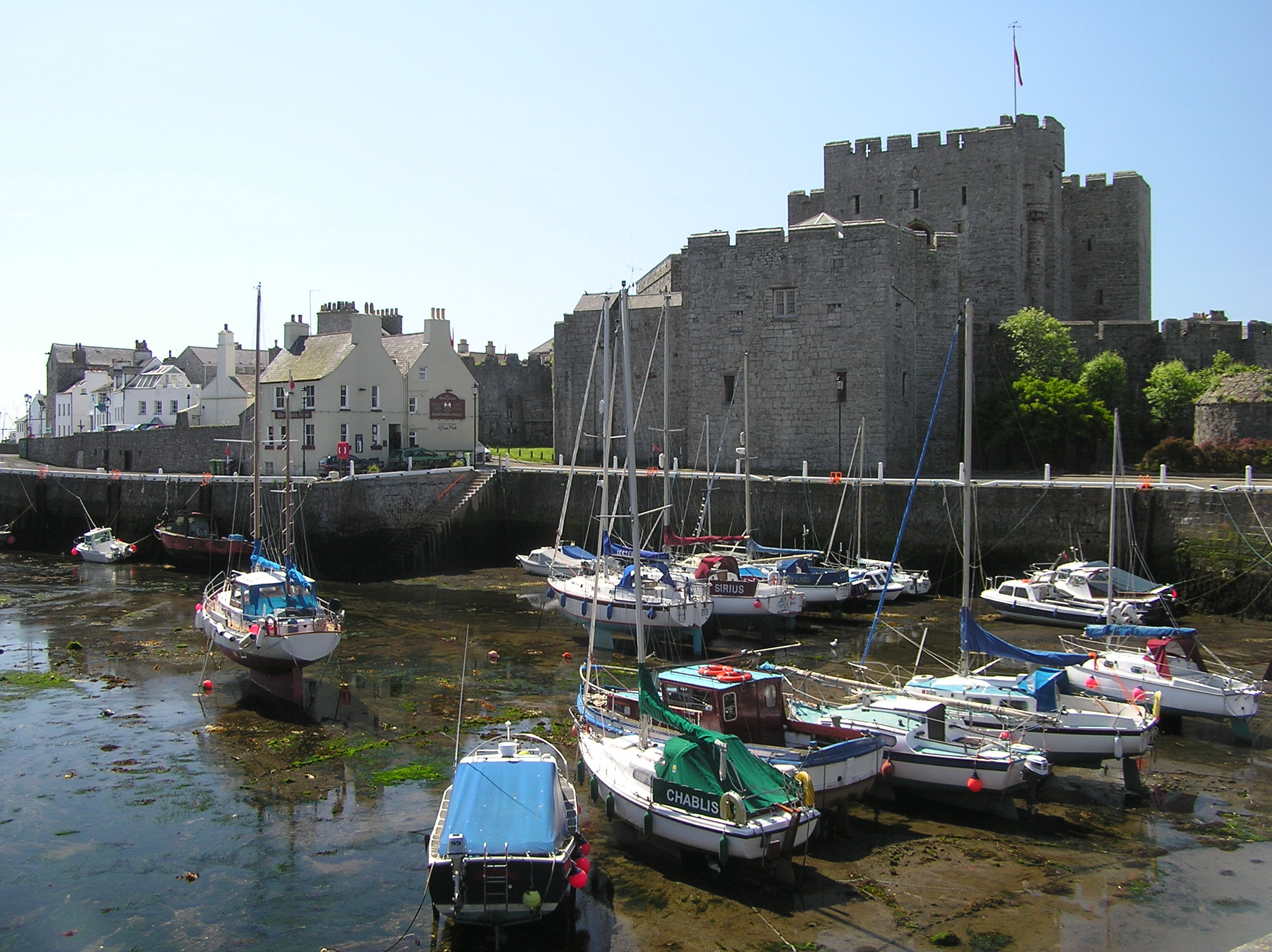
Castle Rushen. Dungal commanded the castle against the invading forces of Robert I.

At some point after his expulsion from Dumfries, Dungal was stationed on the Isle of Man, as the thirteenth- to fourteenth-century Chronicle of Mann reports that the Scottish king led an invasion of this island on 18 May, with the assistance of his friend Angus Og Macdonald and his fleet of galleys. They made landfall at Ramsey and besieged Castle Rushen until Dungal was forced to surrender it on 12 June. Dungal was probably appointed as commander of the castle at some point after an apparent coup by Simon de Montagu. (Note: Dungal is mentioned by an English royal warrant, dated 20 October 1311, regarding an appeal against Simon about felonies committed on the island.) The confusion caused by this revolt may have been seized upon by Robert, who probably launched his maritime invasion from the Solway Firth. (Note: The Scottish attack on the castle has left no traceable archaeological evidence.)

Following his expulsion from Rushen, Dungal appears to have gone to Ireland. The chartulary of St Mary's Abbey, Dublin reports that Robert sent fleets to assail the Irish on the last day of May. Although the Ulstermen are said to have fended off king's raiding fleets, the chartulary reports that he was able to land in Ireland on account of the Earl of Ulster, with whom he obtained a truce. The record of Robert setting off for Ireland may be significant in that he appears to have pursued a feud with Dungal from the castles of Dumfries and Rushen to Ireland. Although in comparison to his English counterpart Edward I, Robert appears to have shown remarkable personal restraint towards prisoners of war—particularly in the case of Dungal himself—there is reason to suspect that Edward Bruce's Gallovidian campaign of 1308 was prosecuted in the context of a bitter feud with the MacDoualls.

== Later history ==
In July 1314, Dungal was sent from Carlisle by Andrew Harclay to warn Edward II at York of an impending attack by Robert upon Carlisle.

In August 1316, Matilda is recorded to have received a gift of £10 from Edward II, and Dungal himself is stated to have been entitled to a yearly sum of £20. At some point, Dungal is recorded to have been ordered by the English Crown to serve in Ireland, and to have petitioned the king for specific lands in Ireland—those of Leixlip—until he could recover his lands in Scotland. In February 1326/1327, Edward III, King of England is recorded to have remitted the balance of the £10 Dungal was owed annually for the ward of the former lands of Henry Malton in York and Cumberland.

In 1319/1320, Dungal was granted a £20 annuity for services rendered to the English Crown.

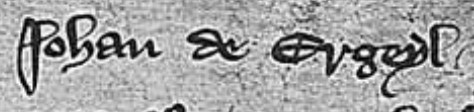
Image a

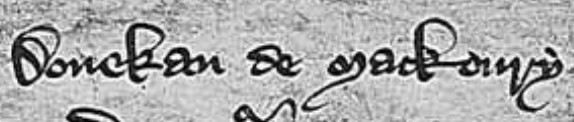
Image b

The names of John MacDougall (image a) and Duncan MacGodfrey (image b), close allies in arms of Dungal, as they appear in a fourteenth-century petition to Edward II.

A petition of Dungal's son and heir, Duncan MacDouall, dating to 1347, relates that Dungal lost £100 worth of Scottish lands supporting the cause of Edward I and Edward II. This source further reveals that a brother of Dungal was slain during the war—on account of the brothers' part in the capture and execution of Robert's brothers—and that Dungal's eldest son was slain, supporting the English cause, at the Battle of Bannockburn. Duncan's petition relates that his father received an annual sum of £20, and that at present, Duncan and Dungal's six other sons were deprived of support. As a result, Duncan requested that his father's pension be continued. Duncan's petition was endorsed: "It seems to the Council it would be charitable to do some favour to them". The names of Dungal's other sons are unknown. One possibility is that one was the Thomas MacDouall whose wife, Johanna, is reported to have been abducted at Carlisle in 1308, along with Thomas' goods and chattels.

Dungal was closely associated with John MacDougall. For example, in July 1310, Dungal is recorded to have received 100 merks from John for his service to the English. Later, in 1315/1316, John, Dungal, and Duncan MacGodfrey are recorded to have received wages and supplies from the English for their services against the Scottish Crown in the Irish Sea region. Both Dungal and Duncan MacGodfrey are recorded amongst the garrison of Carlisle after the fall of Edward Bruce in 1318. It is possible that the activities of the MacDougalls and MacDoualls in the Irish Sea region partly spurned on the Bruce campaign in Ireland. It is possible that Dungal regarded John MacDougall as a kinsman. John died in September 1317, and Dungal supervised his funeral. Dungal acted as the latter's executor, and in March 1326/1327, Dungal is recorded to have petitioned Edward III for the balance of John's annual pension of 200 merks in order to pay off the John's outstanding debts.

Dungal himself was dead by January 1327/1328, when his widow—identified as Margaret—was confirmed the ward of Henry Malton's former lands that had been granted to Dungal. Later in February, Edward III is recorded to have freed Dungal's executors from the demand of debts upon these lands, on account of Dungal's faithful service. Dungal was succeeded by his son, Duncan. Margaret was dead by January 1333/1334.
