= Blind Harry =

Scottish author of the poem The Wallace

- Born: c. 1440
- Died: 1492 (aged c. 50)
- Occupation: minstrel
- Years active: c. 1470–1492
- Notable work: The Actes and Deidis of the Illustre and Vallyeant Campioun Schir William Wallace

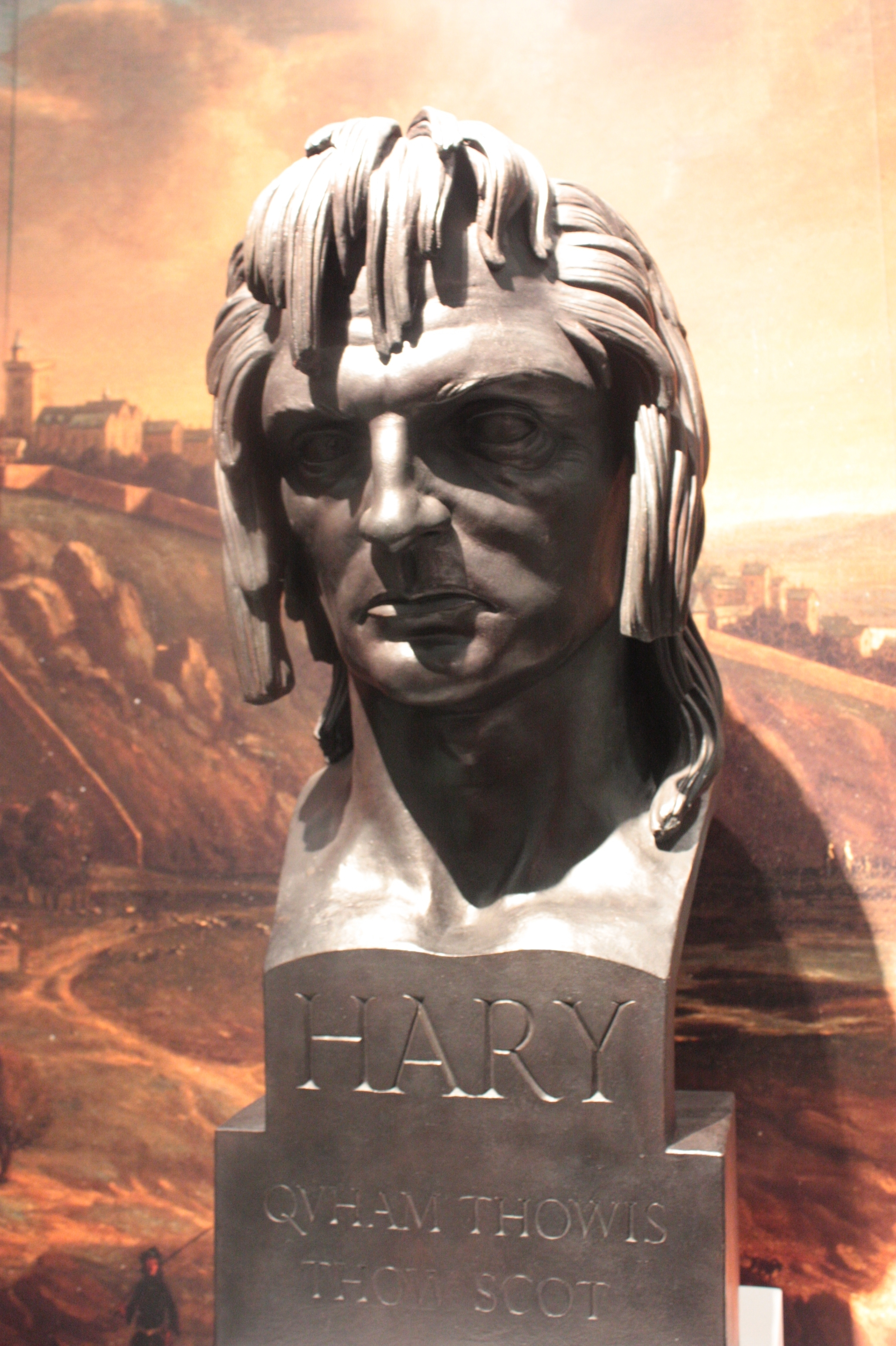
Blind Harry by Alexander Stoddart

Blind Harry (c. 1440 – 1492), also known as Harry, Hary or Henry the Minstrel, is renowned as the author of The Actes and Deidis of the Illustre and Vallyeant Campioun Schir William Wallace, more commonly known as The Wallace. This is a lengthy poem recounting the life of William Wallace, the Scottish independence leader, written around 1477, 172 years after Wallace's death.

== Biography ==
Little is known about Blind Harry's life. One source is the Lord High Treasurer's accounts of 1473–1492, which recorded payments to him for performances at the court of James IV. Blind Harry was given gifts of money by the King at New Year, as were other minor courtiers, but a payment on 2 January 1492 seems to relate to the singing of a ballad accompanied by two Gaelic harpers, "Ersche clareschaw", mentioned in adjacent entries. This is the last mention of Harry in the accounts.

He is mentioned by William Dunbar on line 69 of his Lament for the Makeris early in the 16th century. Historian John Major also wrote about Harry in 1518. These sources differed on whether or not he was blind from birth, but Harry almost certainly seems to have had a military background.

== Acts and Deeds ==
=== Sources ===
Blind Harry claimed his work was based on a book by Father John Blair, Wallace's boyhood friend and personal chaplain. This book has not been seen in modern times and may never have existed; the poet's attribution of his story to a written text may have been a literary device; many contemporary critics believe that Acts and Deeds is based on oral history and the national traditions of Blind Harry's homeland.

Most historians nowadays regard Acts and Deeds as a versified historical novel, written at a time of strong anti-English sentiment in Scotland. At twelve volumes, the work is also doubted to be solely his work. Elspeth King maintained that despite any inaccuracies, Harry's patriotic and nationalistic portrayal was to ensure Wallace's continuing reputation as a hero. Robert Burns acknowledged his debt to Harry, paraphrasing the following lines from Harry's Wallace in his own poem Robert Bruce's Address to his Army at Bannockburn (Scots, wha hae wi' Wallace bled):

A false usurper sinks in every foe
And liberty returns with every blow

which Burns described as "a couplet worthy of Homer".

The earliest version of the work is found in a manuscript written in 1488 by John Ramsay, the purported scribe of John Barbour's narrative poem The Brus. The manuscript is found at the National Library of Scotland in Edinburgh.

=== Criticism ===
Harry's depiction of Wallace has been criticised by Major and others as being fictionalized. Some parts of it are at variance with contemporary sources, e.g., the work describes Wallace leading an army to the outskirts of London, and it includes some episodes of doubtful accuracy before Wallace enters history with the action at Lanark. It also describes him adopting the disguises of a monk, an old woman, and a potter while a fugitive, and travelling to France to enlist support for the Scottish cause, there defeating two French champions, as well as a lion. "Are there any more dogs you would have slain?", Wallace asks the French king.

Harry is often considered inferior to Barbour as a poet, and has little of his moral elevation, but he surpasses him in graphic power, vividness of description, and variety of incident. He occasionally shows the influence of Chaucer, and is said to have known Latin and French.

Blind Harry's words were made more accessible by a translation written by William Hamilton of Gilbertfield (c. 1665–1751) published in 1722. In this form they met the notice of poets such as Robert Burns, Lord Byron, Robert Southey, John Keats, Joanna Baillie, and William Wordsworth. It was also an important source for Randall Wallace in his writing of the screenplay of Braveheart, the award-winning Hollywood film. Most recently, in 1998, Elspeth King published Hamilton's text amended for modern readers as Blind Harry's Wallace.

=== Wallace folklore ===
Blind Harry mentions a number of battles or skirmishes fought by Wallace which are now regarded by historians as unhistorical. These battles are sometimes referenced as historical events by accounts which do not cross-check the stories in Acts and Deeds against another source. Dubious battles include the "Battle of Loudoun Hill" in 1296, the "Battle of Biggar" in 1297, and possibly also the "Battle of Elcho Park". In the case of the folkloric Battle of Loudoun Hill, later enthusiasts have erected a monument to Wallace at the site. (The folkloric battle should not be confused with the genuine Battle of Loudoun Hill fought by Robert the Bruce.) Similarly, the story of a mass hanging of Scots nobles at Ayr is described by Blind Harry, and is repeated in a number of places, including the film Braveheart, but is now regarded as unhistorical.
