= Kirkcolm =

Coordinates: 54°58′26″N 5°04′52″W

Kirkcolm: Scottish Gaelic: Cille Choluim
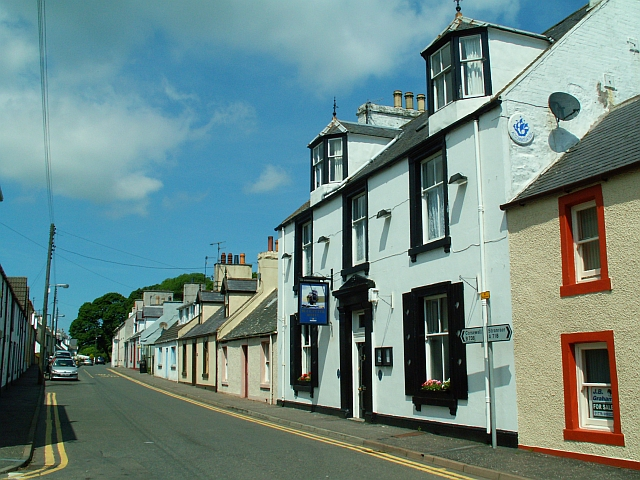
- Blue Peter Hotel, Main Street, Kirkcolm

- Location within Dumfries and Galloway
- OS grid reference: NX027686
- Council area: Dumfries and Galloway
- Lieutenancy area: Wigtown
- Country: Scotland
- Sovereign state: United Kingdom
- Post town: STRANRAER
- Postcode district: DG9
- Police: Scotland
- Fire: Scottish
- Ambulance: Scottish
- UK Parliament: Dumfries and Galloway
- Scottish Parliament: Galloway and West Dumfries

Kirkcolm is a village and civil parish on the northern tip of the Rhinns of Galloway peninsula, south-west Scotland. It is in Dumfries and Galloway, and is part of the former county of Wigtownshire. The parish is bounded on the north and west by the sea, on the east by the bay of Loch Ryan and on the south by Leswalt parish.

== History ==
The name Kirkcolm is often said – even by local people – to mean the Church of St. Columba. However, the early spellings of the name as Kyrcum (1276), Kirkcum (1397) and Kirkcum (1525) cast doubt on that interpretation, as does the modern local pronunciation which is not Colm with a long 'o', but Cum with a short 'u'. The saint who is actually referred to by the name is mentioned by a papal letter of 1397 as 'St Cummin'. This is the name of more than one Gaelic saint of the early Middle Ages, but the most likely to be commemorated here is Cumméne Find, the seventh abbot of Iona who died in AD 669. The parish has a spring known as the Crosswell, or St. Columba's Well, but this designation first appears after the misunderstanding of the name Kilcolm, so is quite likely to be itself a mistake.

Historically Kirkcolm has seen human activity since ancient times. Sheltered from the rough seas of the North Channel and the North Atlantic, Loch Ryan has long been an important safe harbour for vessels. An Iron Age fort is located at Dunskirkloch on the north coast.

In the spring of 1307, at the beginning of Robert the Bruce's campaign in the Wars of Independence, he sent two forces to attempt to gain control of south-west Scotland. One force, led by his two brothers and consisting of eighteen galleys, landed in Loch Ryan. They were immediately overwhelmed by local forces, led by Dougal MacDougal of Clan MacDowall, a supporter of the Comyns.

The barony of Corsewall was held by Alexander Stewart, Lord Garlies from 1622. It was formerly called Stewarton.

== Features of interest ==
=== Kilmorie Stone ===
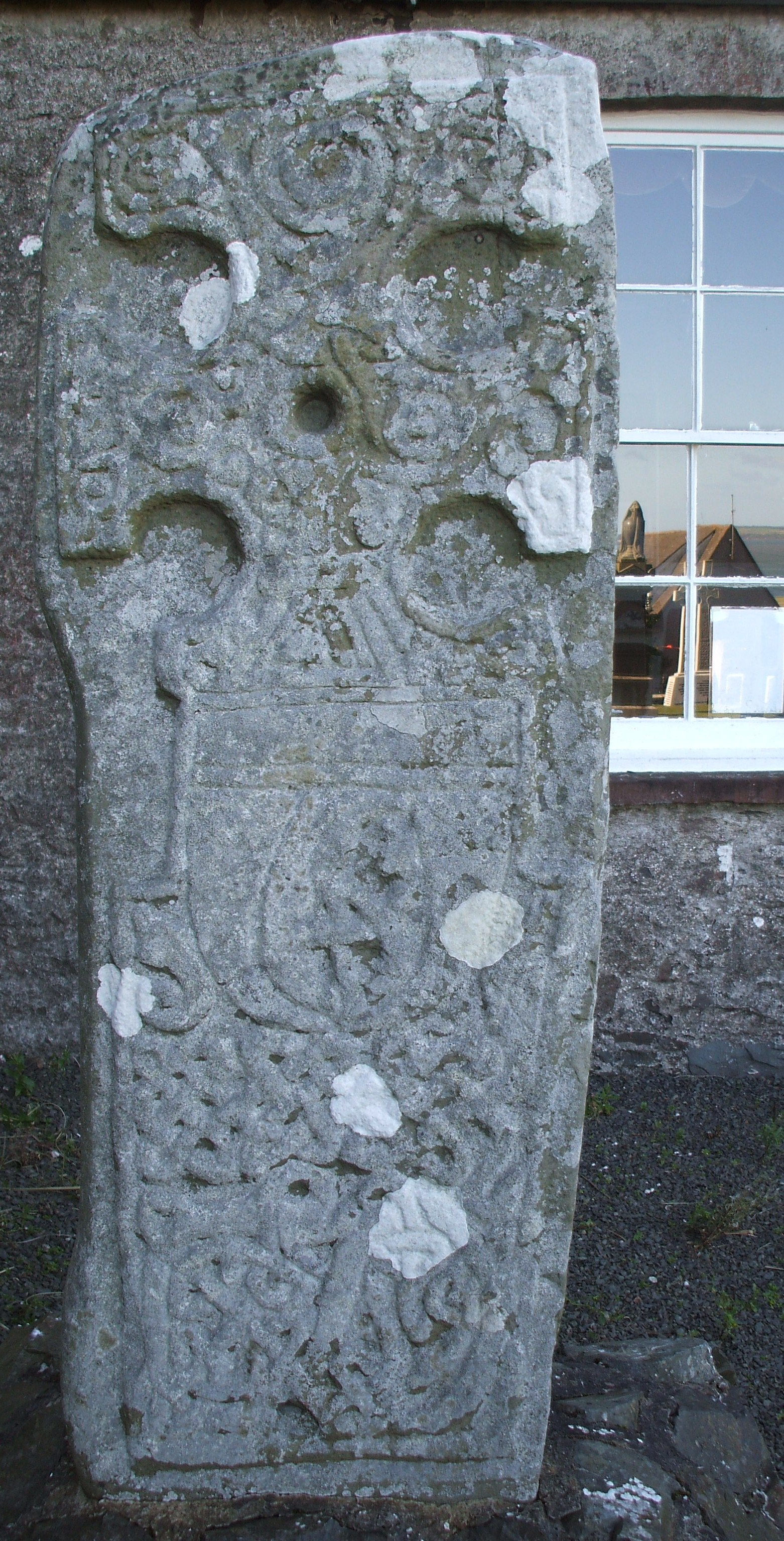
The Kilmorie cross-slab

An Early Medieval cross-slab is located in Kirkcolm churchyard. The cross was removed from the site of Kilmorie Chapel, which was next to St Mary's Well, in the 18th century and built into Kirkcolm church. It was later moved to the grounds of Corsewall House, but re-erected in Kirkcolm churchyard in the 1980s. The designs on cross-slab combine Christian and Norse imagery, reflecting Galloway's Viking and Celtic past. One face of the stone has an elaborately carved cross above a design of intertwined snake-like animals. On the reverse-side is a representation of the Crucifixion. Below is a figure of a man with a pair of tongs and a bird on his shoulder; this may represent Odin or Sigurd. It is thought the carvings on the Kilmorie Stone show the triumph of Christianity over paganism.

=== Ervie-Kirkcolm Church ===
The old Parish Church of Kirkcolm, which was in the grounds of Corsewall House, was demolished in 1821 and a new church was built in Kirkcolm, up the hill from the old Kirk. In 1950 Kirkcolm Church of Scotland was united with Ervie Free Church, and in 1985 the church was linked with Leswalt Parish Church. The Kirk session, held in the court of the parish, was made up of the minister and the land owners and business men of the parish and dealt with moral issues, minor criminal cases, matters of the poor and education, matters of discipline, and the general concerns of the parish.

=== Marian Tower ===
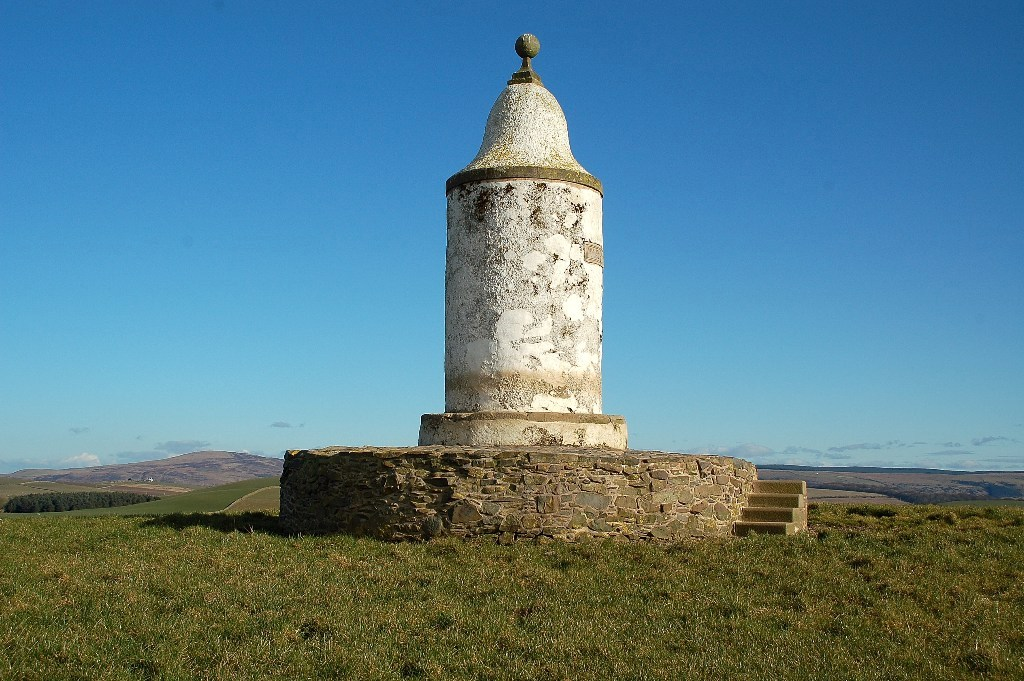
Marian Hill Monument on Craigengerroch Hill

Marian Tower is a 19th-century monument on Craigengerroch Hill, around 3 kilometres (1.9 mi) west of Kirkcolm village. There are panoramic views across the Firth of Clyde from this location.

=== Corsewall Lighthouse ===
Corsewall Lighthouse stands on the north-west coast of the Rhins, and marks the approach to Loch Ryan. Opened in 1817, the light was automated in 1994 and the rest of the building now operates as a hotel. The lighthouse was built by Robert Stevenson, engineer grandfather of Robert Louis Stevenson, and is a category A listed building.

=== Corsewall Castle ===
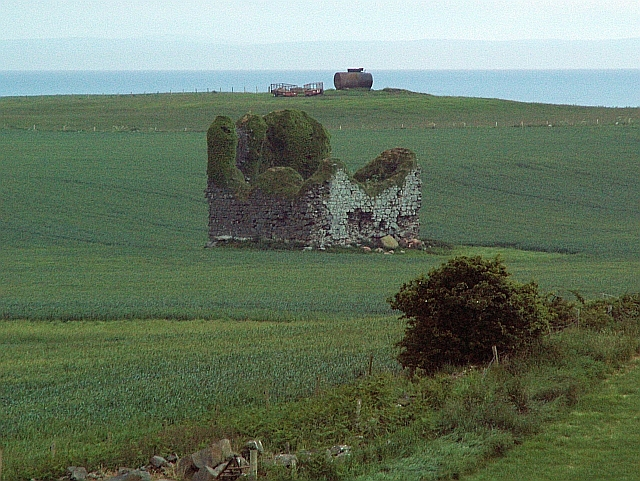
Remains of Corsewall Castle

Corsewall Castle is a ruined 15th-century tower house to the south-east of the lighthouse. It was owned by Alexander Campbell, a son of Sir Duncan Campbell of Loudoun, whose elder brother Andrew was Sheriff of Ayr. The oblong keep once rose to three storeys and lay on a mound which was protected by a ditch. Now all that remains are the stumps of the four walls, which do not rise beyond a tunnel-vaulted basement. The wall still contains the lower section of a turnpike stair. A small cannon was discovered here in 1791, while a cache of gold coins, silver-plate and jewellery was uncovered in 1802. The castle was forsaken in favour of Corsewall House, near to Kirkcolm village, by the 18th century. A legend recorded in the 19th century states that the castle had a spring of such power that, by raising its lid, the owners could at pleasure flood the moat and approaches to the castle.

== Notable people ==
Admiral Sir John Ross (1777–1856), Arctic explorer, was born in Kirkcolm, the son of the Rev. Andrew Ross of Balsarroch. He joined the Royal Navy aged nine, and served in the Swedish Navy. Between 1818 and 1850 he led three expeditions to explore the North West Passage. He built the North West Castle in Stranraer, where he spent his retirement years. His nephew Admiral Sir James Clark Ross joined him on Arctic expeditions and became the first explorer to reach the North Magnetic Pole in 1831.

David James Speirs (born 15 December 1984) is an Australian politician. He has been a Liberal member of the South Australian House of Assembly since the 2014 state election and leader of the Liberal Party since 19 April 2022. Speirs was born in Galloway, Scotland and raised in Kirkcolm. He was schooled at Kirkcolm Primary School and Stranraer Academy. He emigrated to Australia with his parents and two younger brothers at the age of 17 in 2002.

== See also ==
- List of listed buildings in Kirkcolm, Dumfries and Galloway
