= Barns of Ayr =

Fictional site in Ayr, Scotland, used as English barracks

- Ayr

Site information
- Type: Barracks
- Operator: Edward I's Army

Location
- Location in South Ayrshire
- Coordinates: 55°27′39″N 04°37′39″W

The Barns of Ayr was, according to Blind Harry in The Wallace, a site in Ayr, Scotland, which was used as English barracks. According to Blind Harry, a number of Scottish barons of Ayrshire were called to a meeting with King Edward I of England at a barn used as an English military barracks, only to be massacred and hanged, including Sir Ronald Crawford Sheriff of Ayr, Sir Bryce Blair of Blair, Sir Neil Montgomerie of Cassillis, Crystal of Seton, and Sir Hugh Montgomerie. In revenge, William Wallace burned the barracks with the English inside.

This incident is now regarded by historians as unhistorical. No such mass killing of Scots nobles by the English took place around this time, although Edward I of England did become more ruthless very near the end of his life, executing several of Robert the Bruce's supporters. Book 4 of Barbour's epic poem The Bruce, an important near-contemporary source, mentions very briefly that "Sir Ranald of Crauford also, and Sir Bryce the Blair, were hanged in a barn at Ayr", but the context implies that this took place in 1306, the year after Wallace's execution. Whether intentional or not, the purported incident seems to have been a counterfactual reorganization of plagiarized, inflated, roughly contemporary events.

Some accounts describe Ronald Crawford as father of Reginald Crawford, a minor but known historical figure in the Wars of Scottish Independence. However, Reginald Crawford was made Sheriff of Ayr in 1296, which is difficult to reconcile with the traditional story.

== Barns of Ayr in popular culture ==
A version of this incident appears in the film Braveheart, where Wallace is shown as witnessing the mass hanging as a boy. This is even further wide of the mark as Scotland was not under English occupation during Wallace's boyhood.

The location features in the 1810 historical novel The Scottish Chiefs by Jane Porter.
