= Alexander de Brus =

Scottish noble (c. 1285 - 1307)

Alexander de Brus (c. 1285 – 17 February 1307), Dean of Glasgow, was a younger brother of King Robert the Bruce, who supported his brother in the struggle for the crown of Scotland.

Born c. 1285 at Carrick, Ayrshire, he was the fourth son of Robert de Brus, 6th Lord of Annandale and Marjorie, Countess of Carrick. He is said to have been a learned man who was educated at Cambridge and was later named Dean of Glasgow. On 9 February 1307 shortly after King Robert returned to the Isle of Arran from Rathlin Island, Alexander, his brother Thomas de Brus and Sir Reginald Crawford, sailing 18 galleys, landed with a force of some 1000 Irishmen at Loch Ryan. They were met by a force of Gallowaymen led by Dungal MacDouall, who was a supporter of the Comyns. Their force was overwhelmed in the ensuing Battle of Loch Ryan and all three leaders were captured. All three were taken to King Edward I of England at Lanercost, sentenced to death, dragged behind horses to Carlisle, where they were hanged and beheaded.
