= North West Castle =

Country house hotel in Scotland

Coordinates: 54.90484°N 5.02148°W

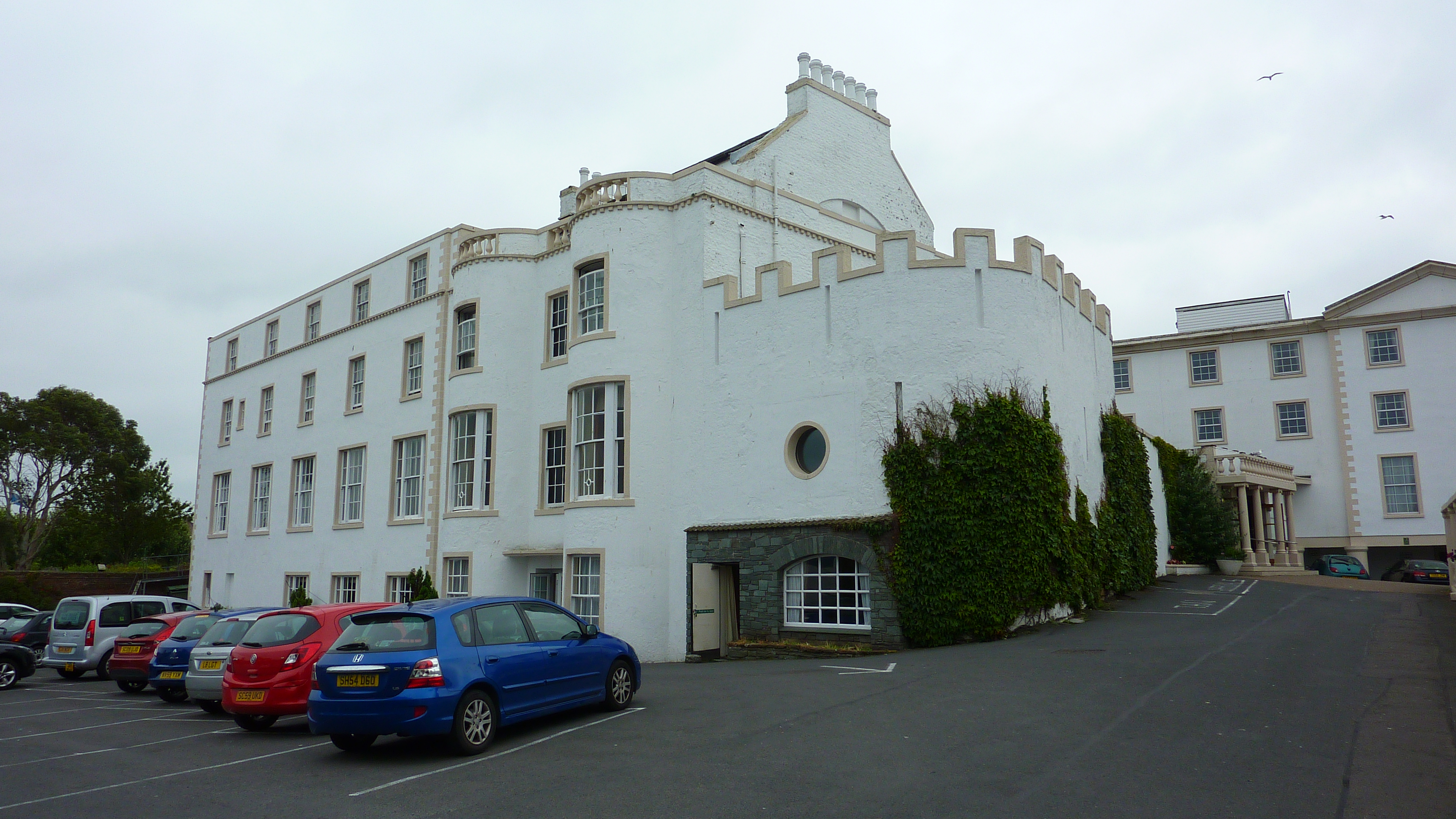
- Interactive map of the North West Castle area

General information
- Location: Stranraer, DG9 8EH
- Opening: 1820
- Owner: Bespoke Hotels

Design and construction
- Developer: John Ross

Website
- northwestcastle.co.uk

North West Castle is a 19th-century three star country house hotel in Stranraer, Dumfries and Galloway, in the south west of Scotland.

It is noteworthy for being the home of Sir John Ross, a famous Scottish rear admiral and Arctic explorer. Ross built the house and developed its grounds in 1820 after returning from the first in a series of Arctic expeditions aiming to solve the question of the Northwest Passage. Ross commissioned a life-size model of the cabin on his ship, the Victory, so that the details of polar navigation could be easily explained to visitors to the Castle; it can still be seen today as its structure forms part of the hotel bar.

In 1860, North West Castle became the home of Rev. Robert Cunningham, an influential figure in Scottish education during the 19th Century. Cunningham lived in the Castle after his retirement as Head Master of George Watson's College in Edinburgh and founder Head Master of the Edinburgh institution for Language and Mathematics (later known as Melville College) and of Blairlodge School in Polmont. His move to North West Castle also came after his founding of the Free Church of Scotland following the Disruption in May 1843. Cunningham was resident at the Castle until his death in 1883.

In 1970, the North West Castle became the first hotel in the world with an indoor curling ice rink and now welcomes curlers from all over the world.
