= The Wallace (poem) =

Poem by Blind Harry

The opening lines of The Wallace

Our antecessowris that we suld of reide,
And hald in mynde thar nobille worthi deid,
We lat ourslide throu verray sleuthfulnes,
And castis us ever till uther besynes.
Till honour ennymyis is our haile entent,
It has beyne seyne in thir tymys bywent.
Our ald ennemys cummyn of Saxonys blud,
That nevyr yeit to Scotland wald do gud,
But ever on fors and contrar haile thar will,
Quhow gret kyndnes thar has beyne kyth thaim till.
It is weyle knawyne on mony divers syde,
How they haff wrocht in to thar mychty pryde,
To hald Scotland at undyr evermar,
Bot God abuff has maid thar mycht to par.
Yhit we suld thynk one our bearis befor,
Of that parablys as now I say no mor.
We reide of ane rycht famous of renowne,
Of worthi blude that ryngis in this regioune,
And hensfurth I will my proces hald,
Of Wilyham Wallas yhe haf hard beyne tald.

The Actes and Deidis of the Illustre and Vallyeant Campioun Schir William Wallace (Modern English: The Acts and Deeds of the Illustrious and Valiant Champion Sir William Wallace), also known as The Wallace, is a long "romantic biographical" poem by the fifteenth-century Scottish makar of the name Blind Harry, probably at some time in the decade before 1488. As the title suggests, it commemorates and eulogises the life and actions of the Scottish freedom fighter William Wallace who lived a century and a half earlier. The poem is historically inaccurate, and mentions several events that never happened. For several hundred years following its publication, The Wallace was the second most popular book in Scotland after the Bible.

The earliest extant text is a copy made by John Ramsay, 1st Lord Bothwell in 1488. Still, that copy has no title page and last few pages are missing, with no mention of Blind Harry as its author. The first mention of Blind Harry as the work's author was made by John Mair in his 1521 work Historia Majoris Britanniae, tam Angliae quam Scotiae. It was later republished in the late 18th century by the poet William Hamilton, in contemporary English. This version also went through over 20 editions, with the last published in 1859.

The poem was used by screenwriter Randall Wallace to write his script for Braveheart (1995).

== The poem ==
The Wallace is a long narrative work composed in decasyllabic rhyming couplets. It forms a biography of William Wallace from his boyhood, through his career as a Scots patriot in the First War of Independence until his execution in London in 1305.

The poem has some basis in historical fact with descriptions of the Battle of Stirling Bridge and the Battle of Falkirk. The factual elements of the poem are, however, combined with many fictional elements. Wallace is depicted as an ideal hero in the tradition of chivalric romance. He is described as being unfailingly courageous, patriotic, devout and chivalrous. The poem features scenes where Wallace uses disguises to spy on his enemies, and another scene where Wallace fights and kills a wild beast (a lion). These scenes in the poem are similar to other British medieval romances depicting "outlaw" heroes, such as Robin Hood and Hereward the Wake.

The Wallace has been described as an "anti-English diatribe". The English are depicted throughout as the natural and irreconcilable enemies of the Scots.

== The author ==
In the early texts of the poem, the author of The Wallace is referred to as "Hary" or "Blind Hary" but little is known for certain about the poet.

A man referred to as "Blind Hary" is recorded as having received payments from King James IV on five occasions between 1490 and 1492. The reasons for the payments are not specified.

A "Blind Hary" is also mentioned by the near-contemporary poet William Dunbar in his Lament for the Makaris. In this poem Hary is included in a list of deceased poets mourned by Dunbar.

The Scots scholar John Mair identified "Blind Hary" as the author of The Wallace in his work Historia Majoris Britanniae or The History Of Greater Britain of 1521.

== Date of composition ==
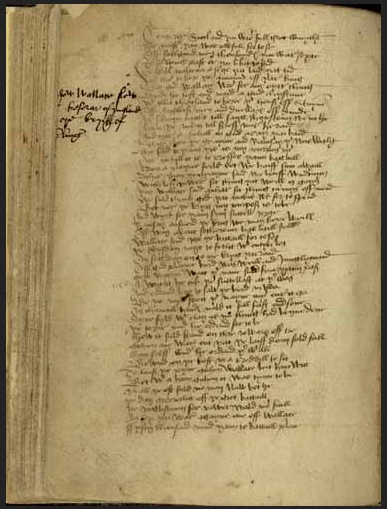
The Ramsay Manuscript of The Wallace, 1488. (National Library of Scotland).

The Wallace appears to date to the latter half of the fifteenth century. The earliest surviving copy, the Ramsay Manuscript, is dated to 1488 but evidence from within the poem itself suggests that it was completed during the 1470s or earlier. Blind Harry refers to having consulted William Wallace of Craigie while composing the poem and Wallace of Craigie is known to have died in 1479.

Furthermore, during the 1470s King James III was engaged in a policy of reconciliation with King Edward IV of England. The poem, with its unsympathetic depiction of the English, may represent a criticism of this policy as typified in its opening verse,

Till honour ennymyis is our haile entent,
It has beyne seyne in thir tymys bywent.
Our ald ennemys cummyn of Saxonys blud,
That nevyr yeit to Scotland wald do gud.

Translation:

To honour enemies is our sole intention.
It has been seen in past times,
That our old enemies of Saxon blood,
Have never yet done good to Scotland.

== Publication history ==
At first, The Wallace circulated only in manuscript form. The earliest surviving manuscript of the poem was written in 1488 by John Ramsay, a Prior of the Perth Charterhouse. The Ramsay manuscript is preserved in the National Library of Scotland under the catalogue number Adv. MS. 19.2.2 (ii).

Chepman and Myllar published the first known printed edition in the early sixteenth century. Only fragments of this edition survive. A second printed edition was produced at Edinburgh in 1570 by Robert Lekpreuik. A third printed edition was published in 1594, also at Edinburgh, by Henry Charteris. The texts of all three early printed editions agree closely with the Ramsay manuscript.

No new editions are known to have been produced during the seventeenth century.

The work's popularity continued into the modern era with editions which often differed substantially from the texts of the sixteenth century. William Hamilton of Gilbertfield produced a translation into English entitled The Life and Heroick Actions of the Renoun'd Sir William Wallace, General and Governour of Scotland which was published by William Duncan at Glasgow in 1722. In 1820 John Jamieson edited a more authentic Scots version of The Life and Acts of Sir William Wallace of Ellerslie also published at Glasgow. In 1889 the Scottish Text Society published a scholarly transcript of the text of the Ramsay manuscript.

Many other editions have been published.
