= Loch Ryan =

Loch Ryan Loch Rìoghaine
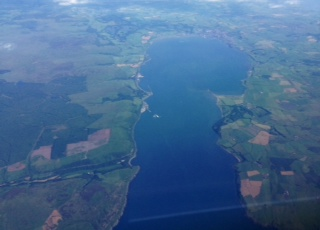
- Aerial view of Loch Ryan.

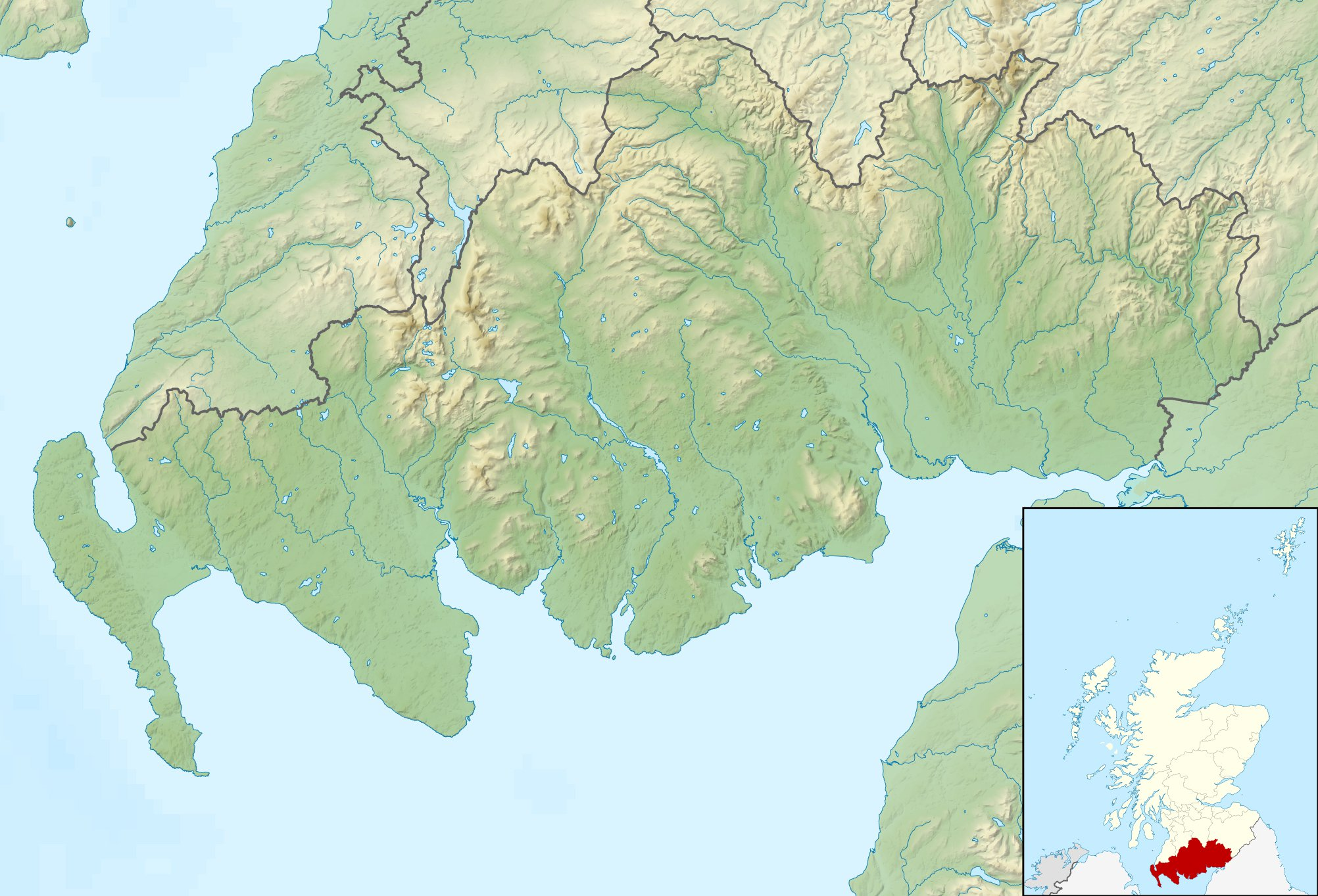
- Location within Dumfries and Galloway
- Location: Scottish Lowlands, Scotland
- Coordinates: 54.986°N 5.055°W
- Type: Sea loch
- Primary inflows: Water of App, Glen Burn
- Primary outflows: North Channel
- Catchment area: 197 km^{2} (76 sq mi)
- Basin countries: Scotland
- Max. length: 13.4 kilometers (8.3 mi)
- Max. depth: 16 m (52 ft)
- Surface elevation: 0 m (0 ft)
- Settlements: Stranraer, Cairnryan, Kirkcolm
- Loch Ryan Lighthouse; Cairnryan Point
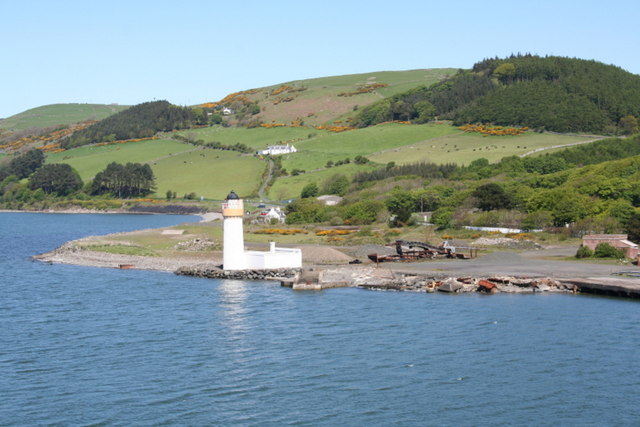
- Cairn Point lighthouse viewed from the southwest in 2009
- Coordinates: 54.974468°N 5.030861°W
- Constructed: 1847
- Construction: masonry tower
- Automated: 1964
- Height: 15 metres (49 ft)
- Shape: cylindrical tower with balcony and lantern attached to 1-storey keeper’s house
- Markings: white tower, black lantern, ochre trim
- Power source: mains electricity
- Operator: Northern Lighthouse Board
- Heritage: category B listed building
- Focal height: 14 metres (46 ft)
- Range: 12 nautical miles (22 km; 14 mi)

Loch Ryan (Scottish Gaelic: Loch Rìoghaine, pronounced [l̪ˠɔx ˈrˠiː.ɛɲə]) is a Scottish sea loch that acts as an important natural harbour for shipping, providing calm waters for ferries operating between Scotland and Northern Ireland. The town of Stranraer is the largest settlement on its shores, with ferries to and from Northern Ireland operating from Cairnryan further north on the loch.

== Location and geography ==
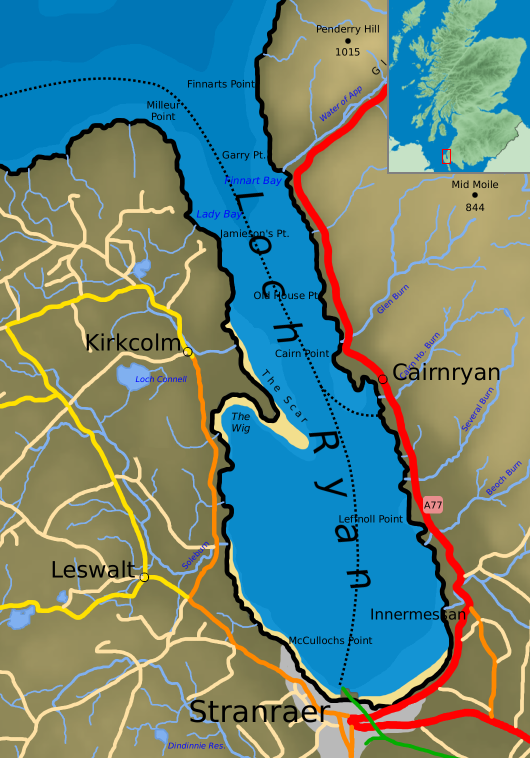
Map of Loch Ryan

Loch Ryan is orientated on a north–south axis, its mouth looking northward into the North Atlantic and Firth of Clyde, and the town of Stranraer sitting on its southern shores. The loch is bounded by the Rhins of Galloway peninsula on its western side and the Scottish landmass in the east (comprising Galloway and South Ayrshire), the northern points of the loch are Milleur Point and Finnarts Point. The loch itself is about 8 miles (13 km) long from north to south, and about 3 miles (4.8 km) wide at its widest point. Nearby roads include the A77 in the east and the A718 in the west. The Loch Ryan basin as it is seen today formed as a result of geological and glacial activity. The first period of activity occurred during the Paleozoic era, with two periods of change. Firstly, during the Devonian period (360 to 416 million years ago) the land in the area underwent a series of shearing events which considerably altered its shape, forming a basin. Then, during the Permian period (250 to 300 million years ago) this basin filled up with sediments which were compacted to form soft sandstones. At this point in time the area would have been positioned around the equator and would form part of the Pangaea supercontinent. The second period of activity was as a result of the numerous glacial episodes during the Quaternary period, from 2 million years ago up until the last glaciers retreated 10,000 years ago.

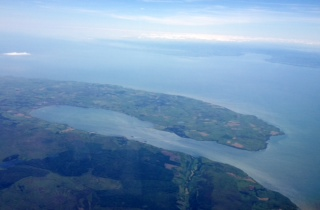
Aerial view of Loch Ryan looking southwestwards; across the north channel of the Irish Sea towards Belfast Lough

As all of northern Europe experienced numerous Ice ages, glacier formation created ice flows and Ice sheets. The erosive force of the ice moved across the land, removing the soft sandstone and leaving behind the harder rocks. When the ice sheet melted with the rising temperatures 10,000 years ago the basin was uncovered and was flooded by the sea, forming the loch that is seen today.

Since the end of the last ice-age the sea has continued to change the loch by erosion and deposition. The loch has a sandbank on its western shores called 'the Scar'. This bank, just south of the village of Kirkcolm, is an important breeding ground for terns.

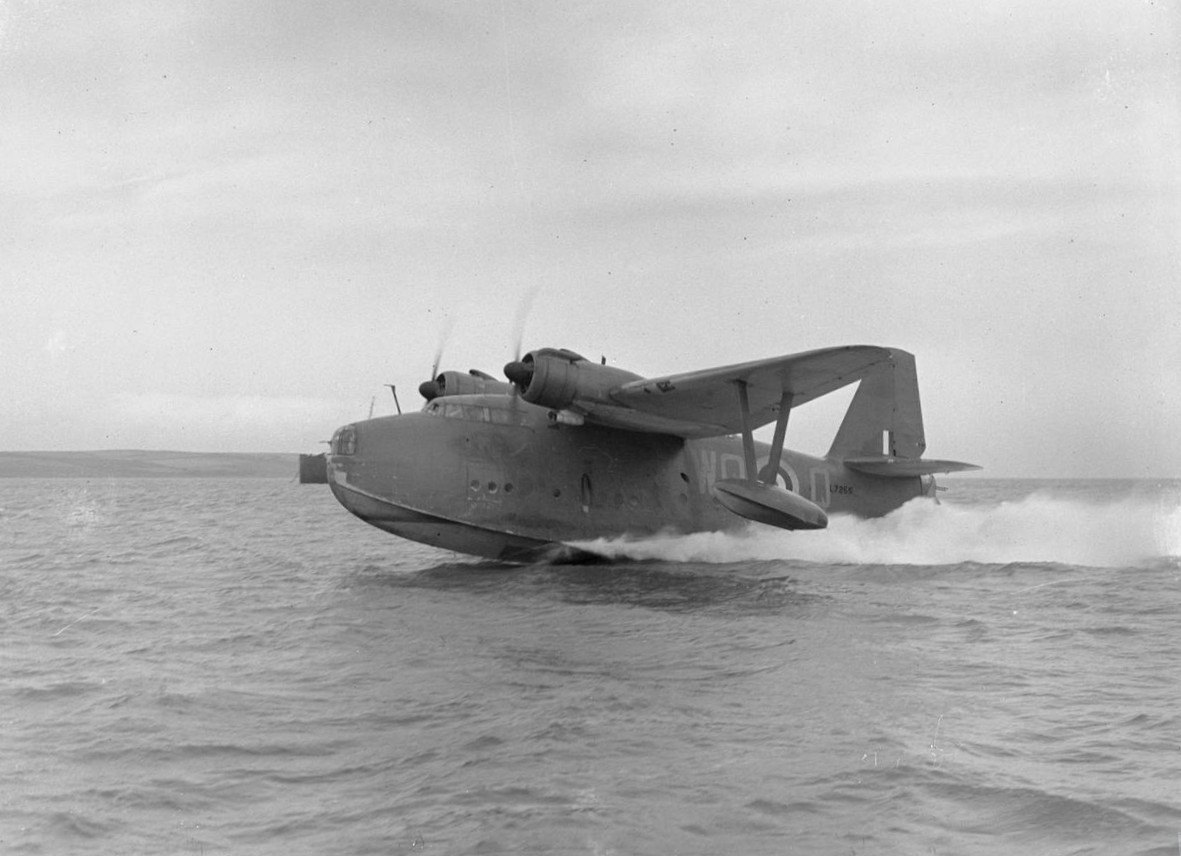
A Saro Lerwick of RAF 209 Squadron, taking off from Loch Ryan, March 1941

== Natural heritage ==
Loch Ryan has Scotland's largest remaining intact native oyster reef. Oysters from the loch have been translocated to sites across Europe to promote species recovery.

== History and usage ==
Historically the loch has seen human activity on its shores since ancient times. Sheltered from the rough seas of the North Channel and the North Atlantic the loch has been an important safe harbour for vessels. William Smith, Britain's foremost classicist of the 19th century, identifies Ptolemy's toponym Abrauannus (Ancient Greek: Ἀβραουάννος), with Loch Ryan, particularly with its outlet to the sea. Ptolemy described Abrauannus or Abravannus as a river of Britannia Barbara, that discharged itself a little northward of the Promontorium Novantum, or Mull of Galloway into Luce Bay. According to Smith, Abravannus is probably the stream which flows through Loch Ryan into the sea – Ab-Ryan, or the offspring of Ryan, being easily convertible into the Roman form of the word Ab-Ryan-us – Abravannus.

In early 1307 at the beginning of Robert the Bruce's campaign in the wars of independence he sent two forces to attempt to gain control of south west Scotland. One force, led by his two brothers, consisting of eighteen galleys, landed in the loch. In the Battle of Loch Ryan, they were immediately overwhelmed by local forces, led by Dungal MacDouall, who was a supporter of the Comyns.

The loch would have been used historically for traditional maritime activities including fishing. The Statistical account of Scotland 1791–99, records:

"This bank abounds with oysters of a most excellent flavour. They are found indeed all around the shores and might be got in great quantities would people drag for them ....... A variety of fish, as skate, flounders, small cod, haddocks, whiting, lobsters, crabs and sometimes turbot are caught within the loch"

The later Account of 1834-45 expands on this issue, as it states:

"Loch Ryan at one time was famous for its herring fishery. I have heard old people say that they have known 300 sail boats in the bay at one time which had come from the highlands and other places, in order to fish or purchase herrings. For many years past the shoals of herrings may be said to have deserted the loch."

A lighthouse was built at Cairn point in 1847 at the northern end of the village of Cairnryan. In 1849 the principal link to Northern Ireland was moved from Portpatrick to Stranraer in Loch Ryan. The reasons for this move were the increasing tonnages of the vessels operating the route which were more susceptible to harsh storms when moored at the exposed Portpatrick harbour on the Rhins coast. The calmer safer waters of the loch allowed larger ships to ply the route as demand increased.

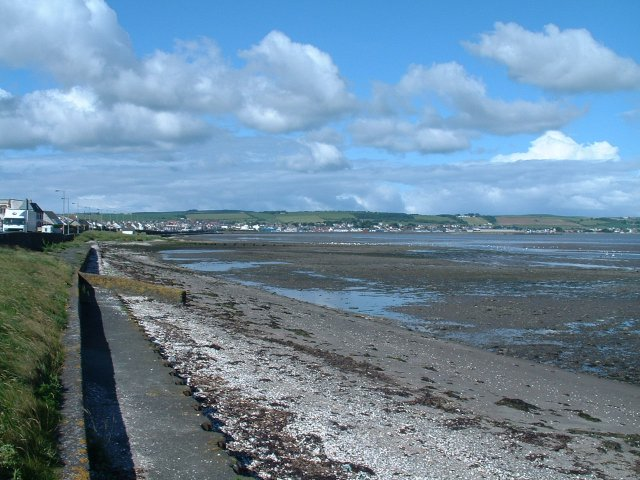
A view of modern-day Stranraer with the tide out in the loch

=== Second World War ===
During World War II the loch was busy with wartime activity. Cairnryan became "No. 2 Military Port", an important secondary large-scale port facility that was available for use should facilities on the Mersey and the Clyde became unavailable due to enemy bombing. Construction of port facilities began in 1941 and two large piers the North Deep and the South Deep, serviced by a dedicated railway line, were completed by 1943. A total of 1.5 miles (2.4 km) of quayside was available, although the facilities were never used to their full capacity as the Clyde and Mersey never received the crippling bomb damage that was feared.

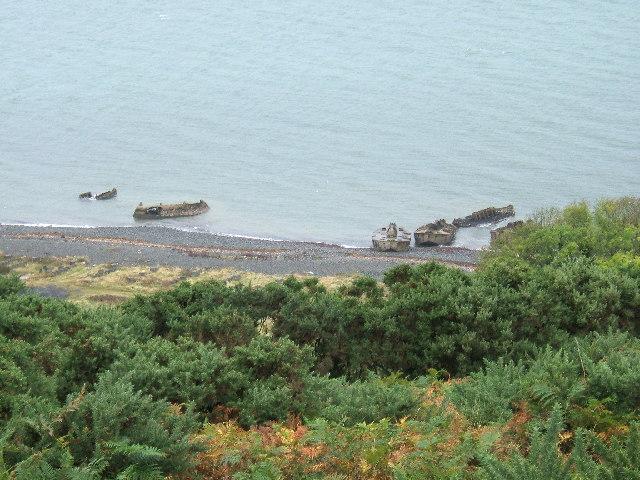
Concrete pontoon 'Boats' north of Cairnryan, a remnant of the World War II activity at the port

The harbour was used as an import point for troops coming from the US after 1942. Only one of the two piers still stands today, and it is unusable due to the poor condition of the wooden piles (the pier has been unused since a small section collapsed with tragic consequences in the 1990s). With the U-boat menace in the Atlantic taking a heavy toll on merchant shipping the area became an important centre for anti-U-boat operations. Flying boats operated from the loch to protect allied shipping making its way to Liverpool or Glasgow either via the North Channel or the Firth of Clyde. There were two RAF stations on the loch, RAF Wig Bay operating from Wig Bay near Kirkcolm and RAF Stranraer operating from the town.

Just north of Cairnryan are what looks like a number of concrete 'boats' resting on the shore - these too are a legacy of the second world war. They are 'Beetles' from the Mulberry harbour project. The beetle pontoons were used to hold up the 'Whale' roadway sections, with four of the whales being built at Cairnryan. With easy access to the North Atlantic, Loch Ryan was used as the surrender destination for the U-boats which were out in the Atlantic in 1945 when hostilities ceased. The U-boats and their crews were held at Cairnryan, before the boats were finally towed out into the Atlantic and sunk. Other wartime activity on the loch included construction of target rafts made out of wood and cork, which were built in Stranraer then floated out the Loch and round the Rhins of Galloway to their positions in Luce Bay for bombing practice (operating out of West Freugh). The loch was used by Winston Churchill when he departed from Stranraer in a Boeing Flying boat on 25 June 1942 when making his second visit of the war to the USA.

The comedian Tony Hancock served at RAF Wig Bay during World War II.

=== Ship breaking facility ===
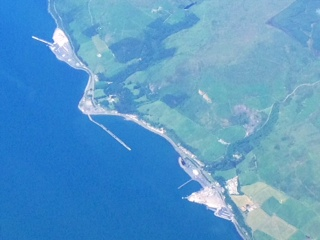
The jetty at Cairnryan, where the Fleet Carriers HMS Eagle and HMS Ark Royal were dismantled.

Following their withdrawal from service in 1972 and 1979 respectively, both HMS Eagle and HMS Ark Royal were taken to Cairnryan in order to be scrapped.

HMS Eagle was taken under tow from Devonport in October 1978, and was followed by her sister HMS Ark Royal in September 1980.

The ship breaking facility in Loch Ryan disposed of numerous former naval vessels; ranging from frigates and submarines to aircraft carriers.

=== Today ===
Today the loch serves as an important location for the ferry link to Northern Ireland, representing the shortest crossing distance between Britain and Ireland. The port activity has increased substantially since the route first started operating out of the Loch in 1849. There are currently a total of four conventional RORO ferries. These are split between two ferry companies, Stena Line and P&O Ferries.

On 21 November 2011, Stena Line relocated their ferry service to Belfast to a location north of Cairnryan Village. Loch Ryan Port is now served by two Superfast Conventional ferries replacing the HSS Fastcraft and old tonnage Stena Caledonia and Stena Navigator. Stena Superfast VII and Stena Superfast VIII now complete the crossing from Loch Ryan Port to Belfast in 2 hours 15 minutes. P&O, operating from Cairnryan run two conventional ferries (European Causeway & European Highlander). The investment in new port facilities at Cairnryan gives security to the future of the North Channel route. It will also lead to future potential small craft maritime development at the southern end of the Loch, which will be completely free from large and regular ferry traffic. The Loch already sees small craft usage, with the Loch Ryan Sailing club operating from Wig Bay, and Stranraer Marina in Stranraer harbour beside the West Pier.

Between 1992 and 1999 Sea Containers operated the SeaCat fast ferry on the Stranraer - Belfast route. They subsequently moved to Troon, before finally ending the service altogether in 2005. While conventional ferries (moving at around 15 knots) have worked the route for many decades the fast ferries were capable of much greater speeds (around 40 knots). The wash that these large craft generated led to speed restrictions being imposed within the majority of the loch, with fast ferries unable to increase their speeds above 12 knots (22 km/h) until they were to the north of Old House point on the northern side of Cairnryan.

P&O Irish Sea's European Causeway entering Loch Ryan

Further speed restrictions were imposed on the HSS during the tern breeding season, when wash from the ship could cause problems for the breeding birds on the Scar. The levels of wash that the fast ferries created was the subject of some controversy, with many suggesting that the death by drowning of a man and his two sons in the loch in July 2003 was due to their boat being overwhelmed by a large wave created by a nearby passing ferry. The Marine Accident Investigation Branch report on the incident suggested, however, that the condition of the boat, the lack of safety equipment on board and a poor lookout were more likely to have been contributing factors, but did emphasise that speed limits should be adhered to and that small boat owners should be made aware of the dangers of ferry-induced washes.

=== Rail access ===
With the 73-mile direct rail link between Stranraer and Dumfries being closed in 1965, Stranraer station only connects the Glasgow South Western Line to Ayr, Paisley Gilmour Street and Glasgow Central as well as Kilmarnock, Dumfries and Carlisle for the West Coast Main Line to Preston, Crewe and London Euston.

== See also ==
- List of lighthouses in Scotland
- List of Northern Lighthouse Board lighthouses
