= Reginald Crawford (died 1307) =

Scottish Knight

Arms of Reginald Crawford. Gules, a fess ermine

Sir Reginald Crawford (died 17 February 1307) was a Scottish knight who took part in the Wars of Scottish Independence.

On 14 May 1296, the English administration appointed him as Sheriff of Ayr by the English administration. In June 1297, he was one of several Scots nobles who did a deal where the English released them to fight against the French. This suggests that he may have participated in the revolt in early 1297, which ended in the capitulation at Irvine.

He supported Robert the Bruce and was captured during the Battle of Loch Ryan in February 1307. He was taken to King Edward I of England at Lanercost, sentenced to death, dragged eight miles behind a horse to Carlisle, where he was hanged and beheaded.

He may have been related to Ronald Crawford, who was hanged at the Barns of Ayr, but this issue is surrounded by uncertainty and later legend.
