= Thomas de Brus =

Brother of Robert the Bruce

Sir Thomas de Brus (c. 1284, Carrick, Ayrshire – 17 February 1307) was a son of Robert de Brus, 6th Lord of Annandale and Margaret, Countess of Carrick and thus a younger brother of King Robert the Bruce. He supported his brother in the Wars of Scottish Independence, ultimately being captured in the Battle of Loch Ryan and later executed by being hanged and beheaded at Carlisle.

Thomas was married to Helen Erskine.
