= Carrick, Scotland =

Traditional southern district of Ayrshire

Carrick (red) within Ayrshire

Carrick (from the Scottish Gaelic carraig, meaning 'rock') is a former comital district of Scotland, and the southernmost of the three traditional parts of Ayrshire.

== History ==
The district of Carrick originally formed part of the 11th- to 12th-century Kingdom of Galloway, whose lords ruled it until 1186, when it was granted to Duncan, son of Gilbert of Galloway. He became the first to hold the Earldom of Carrick. His son Neil became the second Earl, but he had no male heir - accordingly, his daughter, Margaret (also known as Marjorie of Carrick) inherited and became Countess of Carrick.

Upon her death in 1292 the earldom passed to her son Robert de Bruce, later to become King Robert I of Scotland (r. 1306–1329).

Carrick saw some involvement in the Scottish wars of independence under the said Robert the Bruce, which culminated in his victory over the English at Bannockburn (1314). It witnessed much inter-family feuding during the sixteenth and seventeenth centuries, with various branches of the powerful Kennedys contending for land and honour.

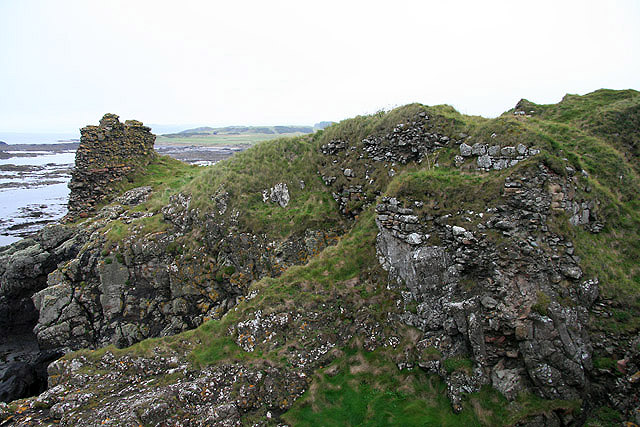
The ruins of Turnberry Castle on the Carrick coast, former seat of the Earls of Carrick

Carrick's scattered villages and rugged terrain made it a favourite haunt of the persecuted Covenanters in the seventeenth century, and its rocky coastline with its many hidden coves and inlets has made it a favourite location for smuggling. Robert Burns made his living as an exciseman along that coastline in the late-eighteenth century.

In 1469, the title "Earl of Carrick" became one of the lesser titles of the heir-apparent to the Scots (later British) throne; as of 2022, this title is borne by William, Prince of Wales, whose principal Scottish title is "Duke of Rothesay".

The name Carrick comes from the Gaelic word carraig, meaning 'rock' or 'rocky place', and may preserve an earlier name from Brittonic carreg, which has a similar meaning (cf. modern Welsh carreg). Compare the English crag, from the Celtic.

Maybole functioned as the historic capital of Carrick. The county was eventually subsumed into Ayrshire, which was divided naturally according to its river valleys into the three districts of Cunninghame (in the north along the River Irvine), Kyle (in the centre along the River Ayr), and Carrick (in the south along the River Doon). These three districts formed Ayrshire, one of the counties of Scotland. A major reorganisation took place in the wake of the Local Government (Scotland) Act 1889; this Act established a uniform system of county councils and town councils in Scotland, and restructured many of Scotland's counties.

Kyle and Carrick was the former name (1975–1996) of a local-government district in the Strathclyde region of Scotland. In 1996, it was re-constituted as a council area, but renamed South Ayrshire.

== See also ==
- Galloway
- Galwegian Gaelic
