= Inch, Dumfries and Galloway =

Coordinates: 54.95°N 4.95°W

Inch: Scottish Gaelic: An Innis
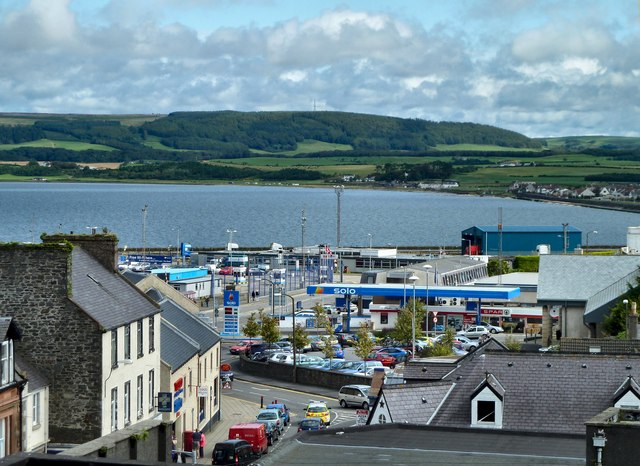
- View east from the top of the Castle of St. John, Stranraer, looking over Loch Ryan towards Inch.

- Location within Dumfries and Galloway
- Council area: Dumfries and Galloway
- Lieutenancy area: Wigtown
- Country: Scotland
- Sovereign state: United Kingdom
- Police: Scotland
- Fire: Scottish
- Ambulance: Scottish
- UK Parliament: Dumfries and Galloway
- Scottish Parliament: Galloway and West Dumfries

Inch is a civil parish in Dumfries and Galloway, southwest Scotland. It lies on the shore of Loch Ryan, in the traditional county of Wigtownshire.

The parish is 10 miles (16 km) in length, and in one part nearly of the same breadth, comprising 30,600 acres (12,400 ha).

== Location ==
The northern section of the parish lies between Loch Ryan and the Water of Luce and consists of hills and heath. The southern section lies chiefly in the isthmus between Loch Ryan and Luce Bay, and is low and gently undulating. The principal town is Stranraer, which is partly within the parish. The Water of Luce, which flows south into Luce Bay, divides the parish from New Luce to the east.

== Settlements ==
At Lochans Village there is a Community Centre and Primary School. Nearby is Kilhilt (also spelt Kinhilt), which gave its name to the Barony of Killhelt. The village of Castle Kennedy, 3 miles (4.8 km) east of Stranraer, is named after the castle which was built in 1607, and burned down in 1716. Stranraer remains the largest settlement in the parish, although the Northern Ireland ferries which called there now sail from Cairnryan. The European Union is partly financing a project to enhance the Stranraer and Loch Ryan waterfront.

== History ==
The name "Inch" is of Gaelic origin, and means an island or a meadow. It is found quite commonly in Scottish place names.

On 9–10 February 1307 the Battle of Loch Ryan was fought during the Scottish Wars of Independence near Stranraer.

This area has been known as, and has been recorded in deeds and charters, as Inch and Insche from about the 15th century, when it was part of the Sheriffdom of Wigtown. In the 16th and 17th centuries, Wigtownshire was composed of baronies which were controlled and defended by the hereditary barons. For example, in 1608 William Adair, Commendator of Soulseat Abbey, was served heir to his father, Ninian Adair of Kinhilt, to the 4 merklands of Stranraver, to the port and burgh of the Barony of Stranraer, Inch, together with many lands in the Barony of Kinhilt, Inch. Inche baronia is referred to in a deed 16 December 1528.

From the 15th century, the Kennedy family were baillies of Inch Parish, collecting taxes and owning and leasing property. Gilbert Kennedy, Earl of Cassillis, a powerful man in Galloway, was granted Ochterlour, south of Stranraer in Inch Parish.

On 25 March 1516 there was a commission to Gilbert Kennedy, 2nd Earl of Cassilis, to be captain and keeper of the manor place and loch of Inch. On 20 June 1605 at the New Castle of Inch was feued by the Crown to John Kennedy, 5th Earl of Cassilis.

On 25 June 1942 during World War II, when making his second visit to the USA, Winston Churchill flew out of Loch Ryan on a flying boat to meet President Roosevelt. During the war Cairnryan became an important No. 2 Military port for England and Scotland. Two large piers were built and the harbour was used for troops coming from the USA after 1942. The area became an important centre for anti-U-boat operations. Flying boats operated from the loch to protect allied shipping making its way to Liverpool or Glasgow. With easy access to the North Atlantic, Loch Ryan was used as the surrender destination for the U-boats which were out in the Atlantic in 1945, and the U-boats and their crews were held at Cairnryan, before the boats were towed out to sea and sunk.

== Places of interest ==
The chief antiquities include Innermessan Motte, Craigcaffie Broch (Teroy Broch), Craigcaffie Castle, the remains of Larg Castle, the standing stones of Glenterra, and numerous cairns. The remains of the 12th-century Soulseat Abbey are situated by the herb garden on the south side of Soulseat Loch.

The old House of Croach north-east of Meikle Laight farmhouse, was probably built c. 1460 after the lands were detached from the Agnew family estate in favour of William Agnew, 2nd son of Sir Andrew Agnew, and it was occupied by members of that family until 1701 when they built Lochryan House. The ruined walls of Croach, east of Cairn Point, are about 4 feet (1.2 m) wide. Craig Caffie Tower was built around 1580 near Innermessan. In 1847 a lighthouse was built at Cairn Point at the northern end of the village of Cairnryan.

Ferries for Northern Ireland leave from Loch Ryan, on the western border of Inch. This is the shortest crossing between Britain and Ireland. There are four conventional RORO ferries and two fast ferries from Cairnryan.

=== Brochs, forts and other monuments ===
A fortified town was located at Shinraggie or Shinriggie at the head of Beoch Glen. A broch is located at Craigcaffie, while a motte is shown at Cults on old Ordnance Survey maps. There is a hut circle at Little Laight on the western flank of Laight Moor, 350 metres (1,150 ft) from the summit. White Cairn is located near the Shinriggie fortified town. There are crannogs at Cults Loch and Black Loch.

== Parish church ==
The parish church is located on the shore of Loch Inch, and before the Scottish Reformation it belonged to the Bishop of Galloway. Within the parish there existed two chapels, that of St John in Stranraer, and the chapel of St Patrick in Portpatrick. The latter was called the Black Quarter of the Inch, but became a separate parish in 1628. The church was located at the now-nonexistent village of Inch. Opposite the church, within the Loch, is an island, from which the area derives its name: inch is a Scots and Irish word for island, derived from the Gaelic innis. This island is about 550 metres (1,800 ft) in circumference, and formerly held a place of worship, vestiges of which are still remaining. It communicated with the land by a causeway and drawbridge. About 1130 St Malachy visited Galloway on three occasions and on one visit beside the Green Lake, he decided to plant a community, being influenced that it lay within a mile or so of the manor of Inch which was the seat of the Bishop of Galloway.

In 1931, following the union of the Church of Scotland and the United Free Church in 1929, the parish church of Inch was united with the former United Free Church congregation of Inch at Castle Kennedy. After the union the former Castle Kennedy Church was converted for use as a church hall.

In 1982 Inch was linked with Stranraer St Andrew's and a union later followed between Inch and Loch Ryan in 1985. After the union the parish, which continued under the name of Inch, remained linked to Stranraer St Andrew's. The kirk session sat within the Presbytery of Stranraer until 1963 when, by Act of Assembly, the Presbytery of Wigtown and the Presbytery of Stranraer were united under the name of the Presbytery of Wigtown and Stranraer.

Cairnryan Free Church began as an extension charge before the disruption of 1843. It was separately sanctioned in 1844, with a church opened in the following year. It transferred to the United Free Church in 1900, but the minister retired in the same year and it was served by probationers and missionaries, and did not transfer to the Church of Scotland. The UFC charge was in the presbytery of Wigtown and Stranraer and the synod of Dumfries and Galloway. In 1858 the Parish of Loch Ryan was disjoined from that of Inch, and erected quoad sacra; the church of this parish had been built at Cairnryan a number of years prior in 1841. In 1941 the charge of Loch Ryan was united to Glenapp, Ballantrae to form the session of Lochryan and Glenapp, and following the local union both parish churches remained in use for public worship. In 1985 the union between Glenapp and Lochryan was dissolved in favour of a union between Loch Ryan and Inch under the name of Inch. The kirk session sat within the Presbytery of Stranraer until 1963 when, by Act of Assembly, the Presbytery of Wigtown and the Presbytery of Stranraer were united together under the name of the Presbytery of Wigtown and Stranraer.

== University of Glasgow's archaeology project in Inch ==
The Local History and Archaeology Group are taking part in the University of Glasgow's community archaeology project in Inch – Discovering Dumfries and Galloway's Past. From September 11–15, 2012 there will be a group working with Giles Carey doing a geo-physics survey of the area to the north of the motte at Innermessan between Stranraer and Cairnryan. It is a site with a very long history – from early Mesolithic ancestors, about 10,000 years ago to a medieval town, now disappeared, which in its time was more important than Stranraer. The funding for the first phase of the study is until February 2013, but it is hoped that once the geo-physics investigations have taken place, further funding will enable a more thorough investigation over a three-year period.

== Innermessan ==
Innermessan was a medieval town in the parish of Inch which now no longer exists. Innermessan was the most considerable place in the Rhins and the greatest town thereabout till Stranraer was built. "Innermeason" is recorded in a charter by King David II of Scotland (reigned 1329 – 1371) to the Bishop of Galloway, "of the lands of Dermore, in the Rins Rhins within the town of Innermeasan. David II was son of King Robert the Bruce. The barony and ville of Invermessan (baronia ville de Invermassan) was in a deed of 14 October 1426. Another deed of 25 March 1566 noted the Baronia of Invermessene. A mound at Balyett is thought to be the site of a Norman timber-built castle. Later in Innermessan's history the town grew around a substantial estate with power over the imports and exports in Loch Ryan and eventually became Loch Ryan's largest settlement. Finds indicate that a Roman road passed through Innermessan.

== Gallery ==
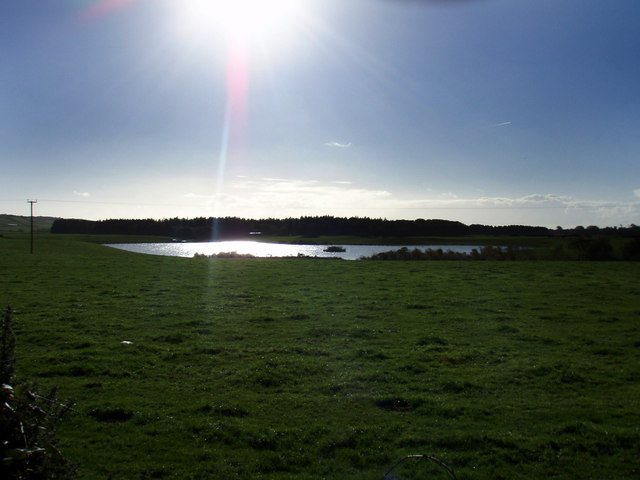
Cults Loch crannog

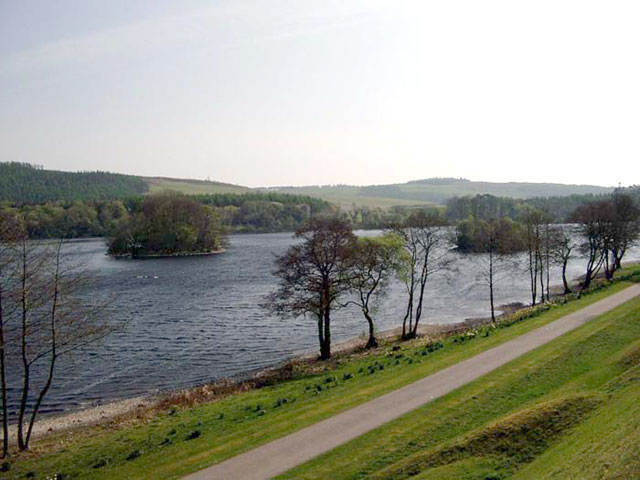
Black Loch at Castle Kennedy. The Island is a crannog created and populated in prehistoric times

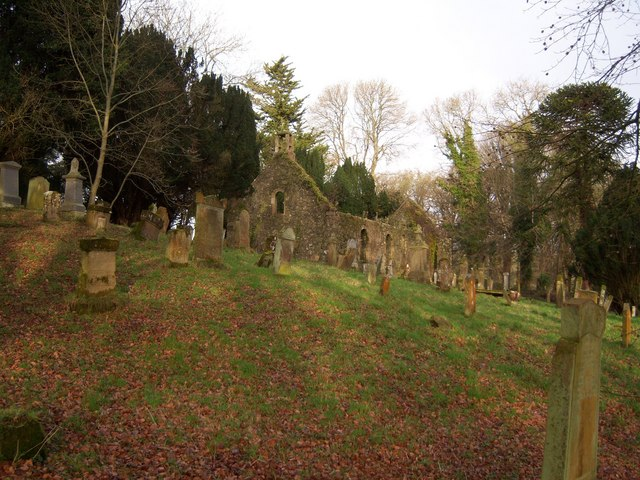
Old Inch Church

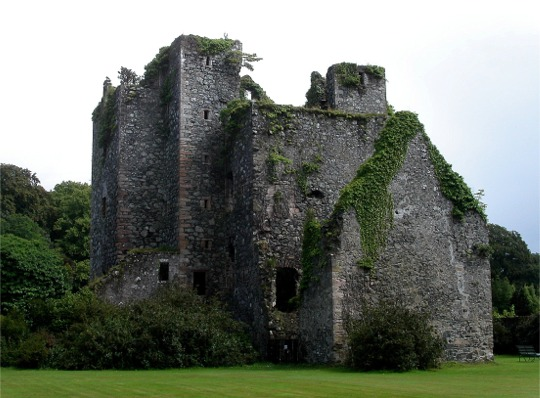
Castle Kennedy

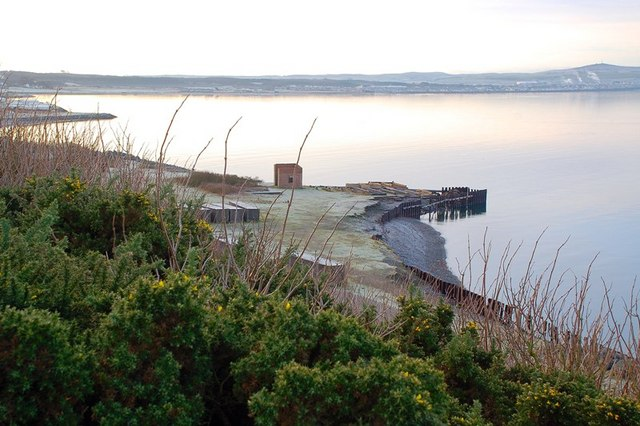
Old Slipway at Innermessan on Loch Ryan, Inch, Wigtownshire with Stranraer in the background

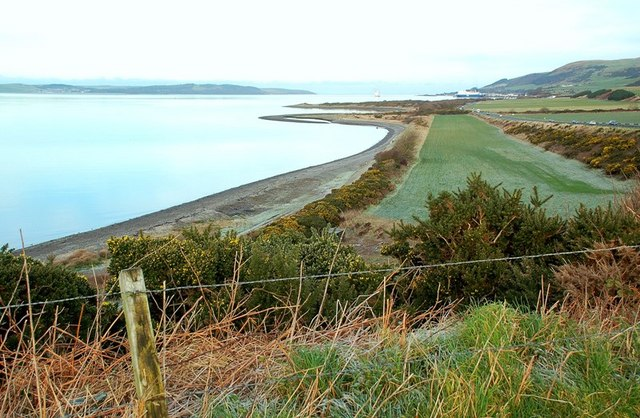
Towards Leffnoll Point

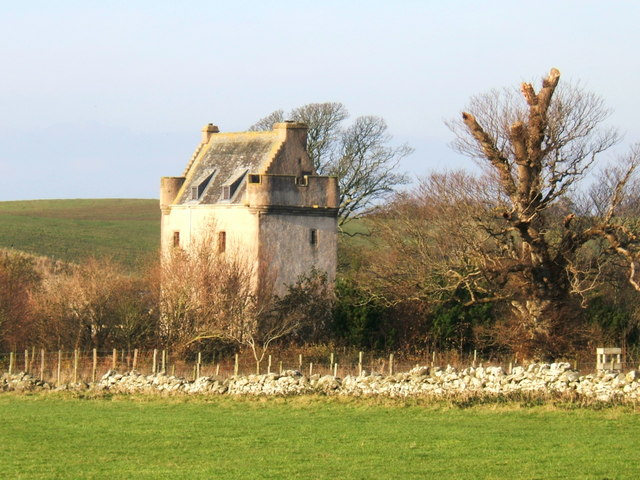
Craig Caffie Tower near Innermessan, Stranraer

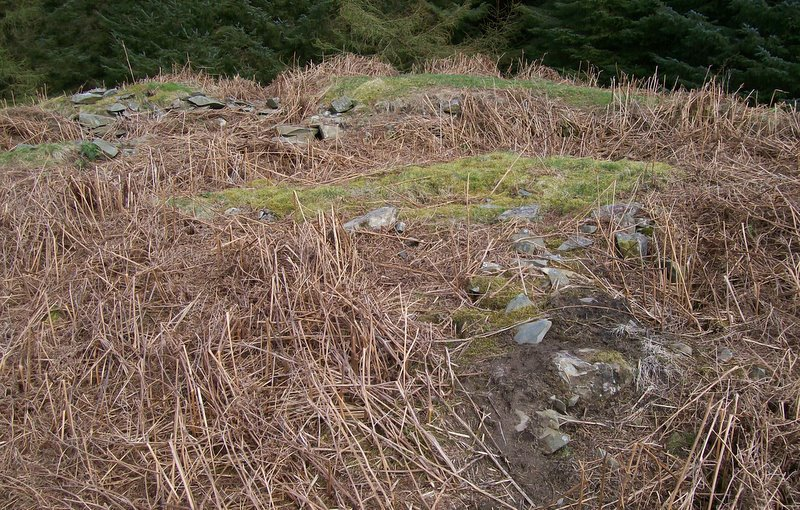
Craigcaffie ( Teroy ) Broch or Fort

== See also ==
- List of listed buildings in Inch, Dumfries and Galloway
