= New Luce =

Civil parish in south-west Scotland

Coordinates: 54.944°N 4.852°W

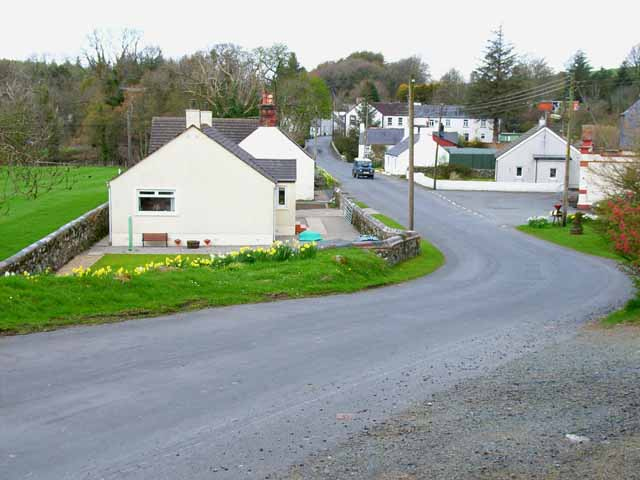

- Location within Dumfries and Galloway
- OS grid reference: NX174647
- Council area: Dumfries and Galloway
- Lieutenancy area: Wigtownshire
- Country: Scotland
- Sovereign state: United Kingdom
- Post town: NEWTON STEWART
- Postcode district: DG8
- Dialling code: 01581
- Police: Scotland
- Fire: Scottish
- Ambulance: Scottish
- UK Parliament: Dumfries and Galloway
- Scottish Parliament: Galloway and West Dumfries

New Luce (Scottish Gaelic: Baile Ùr Ghlinn Lus) is a civil parish in Dumfries and Galloway, south-west Scotland. It lies in the traditional county of Wigtownshire, and is about 10 miles (16 km) in length and 5 miles (8.0 km) in breath, being the upper part of the original Glenluce Parish. New Luce is shown as a civil parish on John Ainslie's county map of 1782.

New Luce is also the principal village within the parish. The coast to coast walk, the Southern Upland Way, passes close to the village. The Covenanter Alexander Peden spent time preaching in the village.

== Places of interest ==
A viaduct carried the Stranraer-Glasgow railway over the Main Water of Luce. Down the river from the viaduct is a pool called Bloody Wheel where the Hays of Castle of Park, near Glenluce (Old Luce), and the Linns of Larg in the adjoining parish of Inch, were said to have had a violent encounter centuries ago.

=== Archaeology ===
The Caves of Kilhern, between 2,000 and 3,000 years old, are in south New Luce.

Cairn na Gath ("cairn of the wild cat"), near Balmurrie, is a chambered long cairn dating to the Neolithic (later Stone Age). At the south end there are remains of huts or enclosures. In addition, there are ancient hut circles at Lagafater, around 8 miles to the north of New Luce.

Cairn Macneilie, 100 metres (330 ft) north-west of Cruise, New Luce, is a Bronze Age round cairn, 56 feet (17 m) in diameter and 3 feet 6 inches (1.07 m) high. There is another Cairn Macneilie at Inch Parks, by Lochinch Castle in Inch Parish. They may have been named after a person who conducted archaeological excavations.

=== Forts ===
Rev. George Wilson, in his Archaeological and Historical Collections relating to Ayrshire and Galloway, lists forts in New Luce:

1. Cruise Back Fell, fort marked on the map as two cairns, 80 ft long, on the Fell of Cruise or High Galdenoch.
2. Gleniron Several fort with a cluster of green rings, and a large ditch and mote.
3. Mid Gleniron
4. Mid Gleniron tomb, where the long cairn had enclosed an earlier smaller one.
5. Garvilland Iron-age hill fort on the Bennan, double at the one end and with hut circles.
6. Klashherne, two rings, and three more, not on O.S. map.
7. Balmurrie, ring with two hut circles.

== Gallery ==
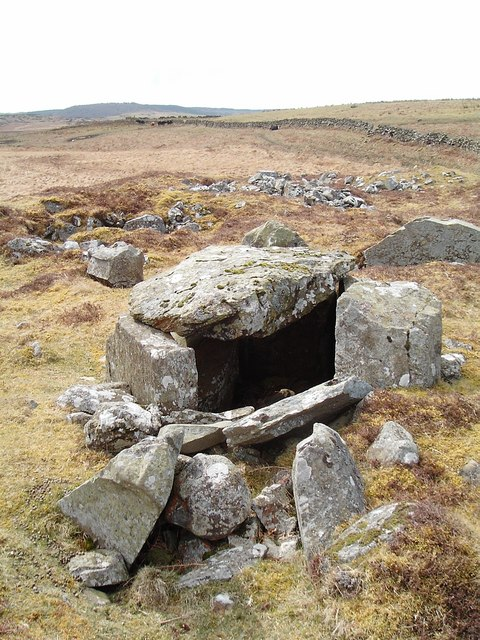
'Caves' of Kilhern: six neolithic chambered cairns, estimated at between 2000 and 3000 years old

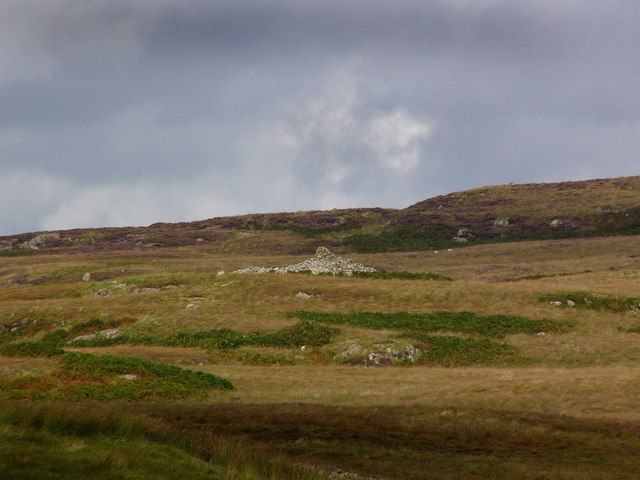
Cairn na Gath, near Balmurrie

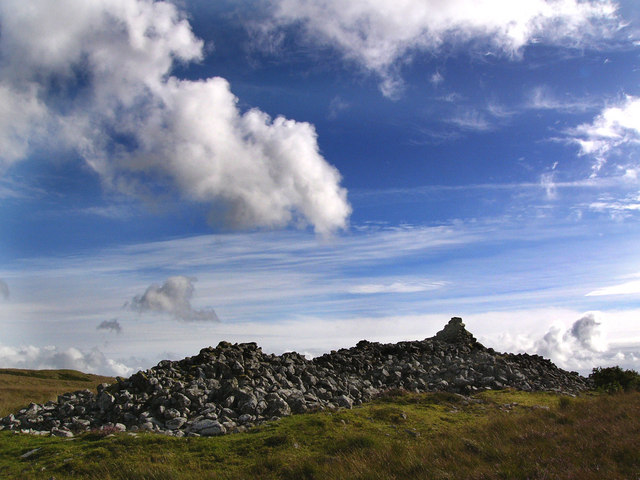
Cairn na Gath. This is a chambered long cairn dating to the neolithic

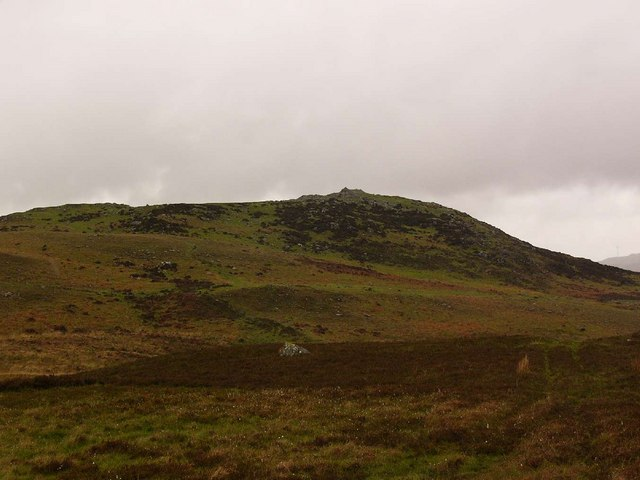
Bennan of Garvilland Iron Age hill fort

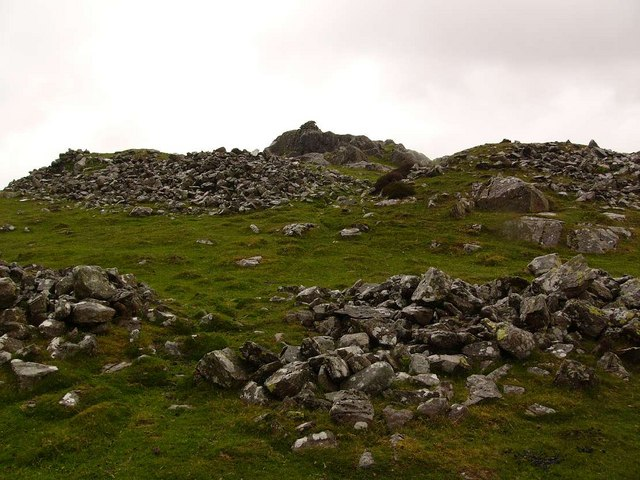
Bennan of Garvilland hill fort - entrance

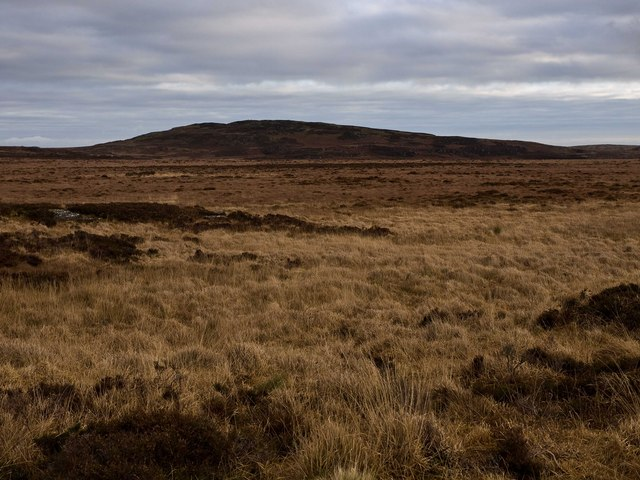
Bught Fell and Kilhern Moss

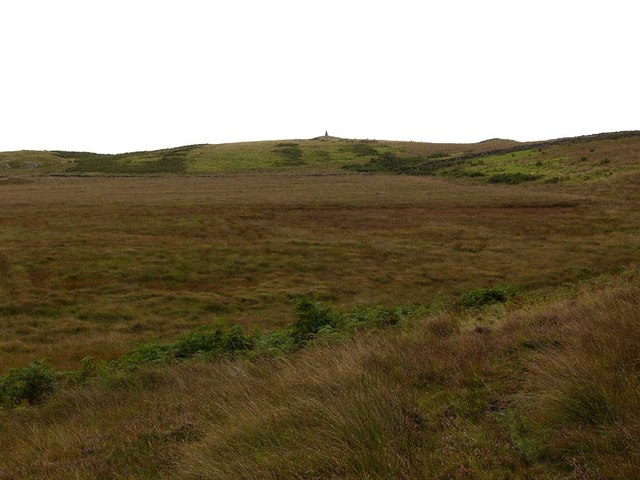
Looking across open moorland to the cairn on Cairn Park, behind Glenchamber

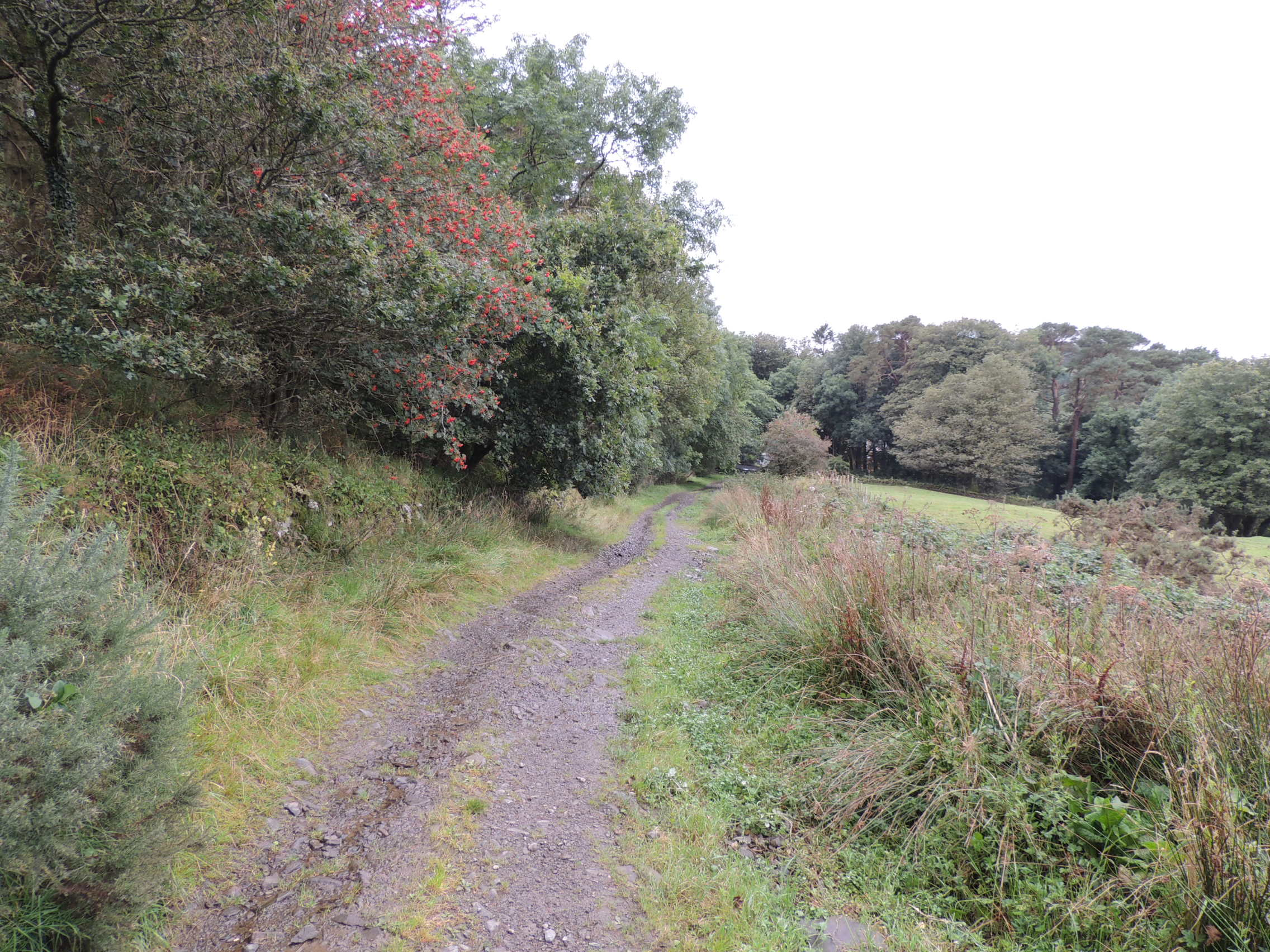
Southern Upland Way near Cairn Macneilie, Cruise

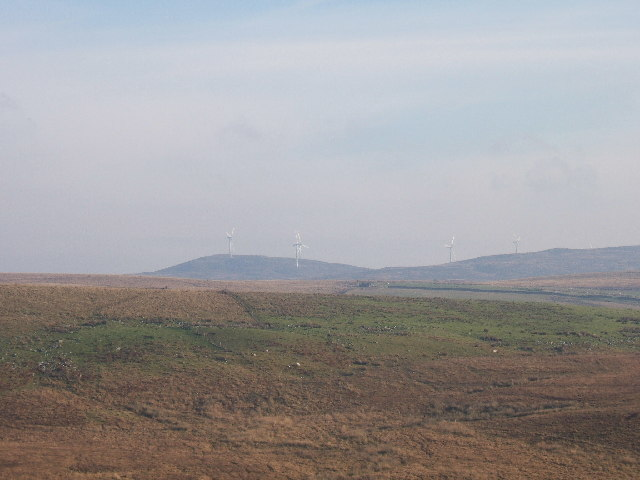
A windfarm at Artfield Fell, east of New Luce

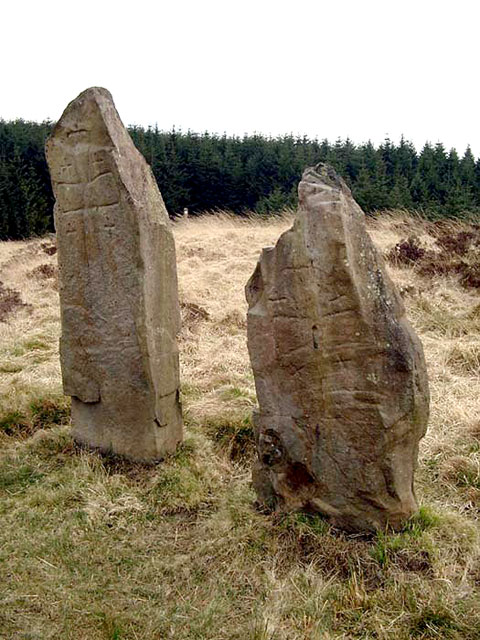
Laggangairn Standing Stones

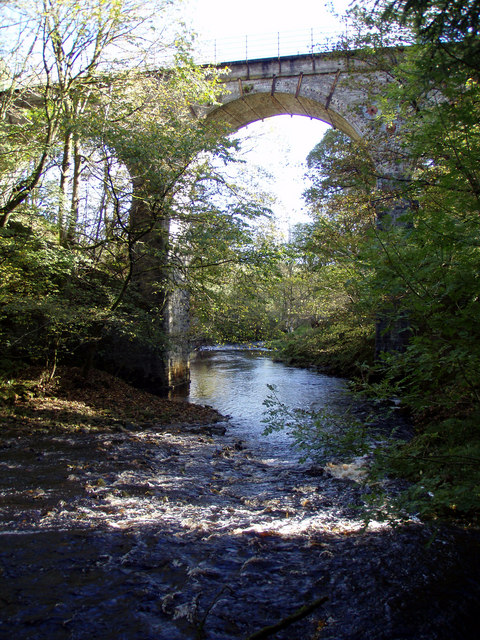
Viaduct over Main Water of Luce

== See also ==
- List of listed buildings in New Luce, Dumfries and Galloway
