= Stranraer Sheriff Court =

Judicial building in Stranraer, Scotland

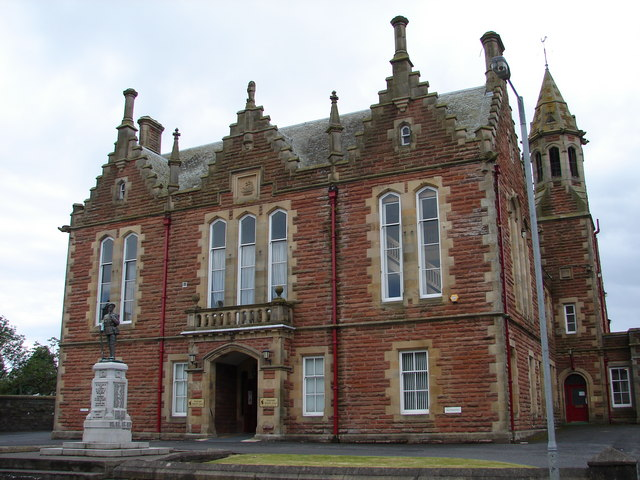
- Stranraer Sheriff Court

- Shown in Dumfries and Galloway
- 54.9029°N 5.0276°W
- Location: Lewis Street, Stranraer

History
- Built: 1874

Site notes
- Architect(s): Thomas Brown II and James Maitland Wardrop
- Architectural style: Gothic Revival style

Listed Building – Category B
- Official name: Stranraer Sheriff Court and Justice of the Peace Court, including war memorial, gatepiers and boundary walls, Lewis Street, Stranraer
- Designated: 20 July 1972
- Reference no.: LB41785

Stranraer Sheriff Court is a judicial building in Lewis Street, Stranraer, Dumfries and Galloway, Scotland. The building, which continues to be used as a courthouse, is a Category B listed building.

== History ==
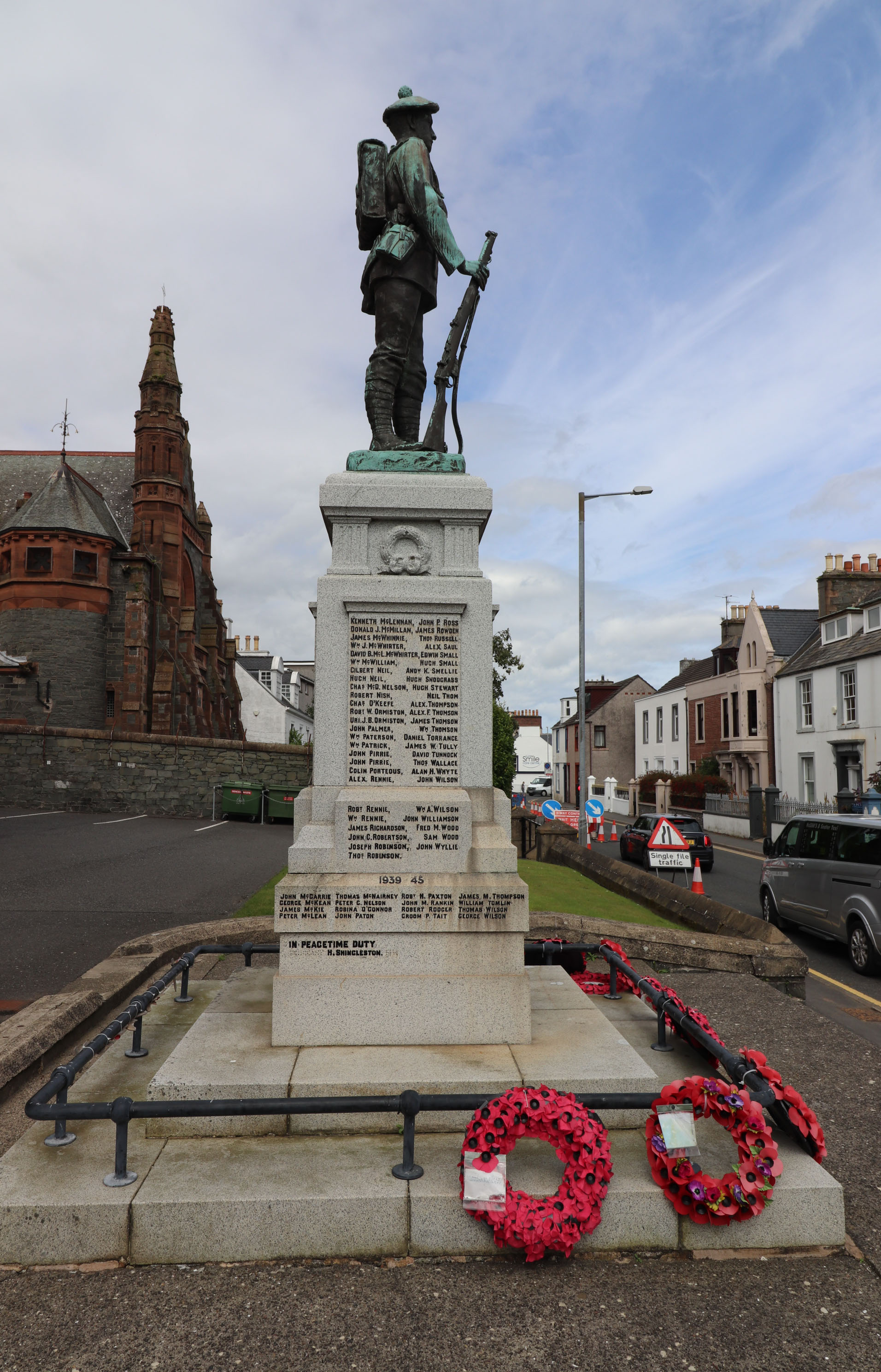
The war memorial outside the sheriff court

The first judicial building in Stranraer was a tolbooth which was built on part of the local parish churchyard and dated back to the late 17th century. It was replaced, in 1776, by the old town hall in George Street, which was extended to the rear to accommodate a corn exchange and a courtroom in 1855. However, in the early 1870s, the Commissioners of Supply decided that Stranraer need a dedicated courthouse. A new courthouse was designed by Thomas Brown II and James Maitland Wardrop in the Gothic Revival style, built in red sandstone from Galashiels with buff stone dressings from Hexham and was officially opened on 15 January 1874.

The design involved a symmetrical main frontage of three bays facing into Lewis Street. The central bay featured a portico, which incorporated an arch with a hood mould and supported a balcony with a balustrade; there were tripartite lancet windows on the first floor. The outer bays were fenestrated by sash windows with architraves on the ground floor and by bi-partite lancet windows on the first floor. At roof level, there were stepped gables above all three bays: the central gable contained a panel carved with the Stranraer coat of arms, while the outer gables contained small lancet windows. Internally, the principal room was the main courtroom on the first floor.

Following the implementation of the Local Government (Scotland) Act 1889, which established county councils in every county, Wigtownshire County Council held its first meeting at Wigtown County Buildings in The Square at Wigtown on 22 May 1890, when it was decided to hold the council's annual meeting each May at Wigtown, but other meetings were to be held alternately at Stranraer and Newton Stewart. The council later established its main offices at Ashwood House on Sun Street, Stranraer, close to the Sheriff Court on Lewis Street which was the council's meeting place when it met in Stranraer.

A war memorial, in the form of a soldier from the Royal Scots Fusiliers wearing a Tam o' shanter mounted on a granite pedestal, which was intended to commemorate the lives of local service personnel who had died in the First World War, was unveiled outside the sheriff court in 1920.

After the abolition of Wigtownshire County Council in 1975, the building continued to serve a judicial function, being used for hearings of the sheriff's court and, on one day a month, for hearings of the justice of the peace court. It was extensively refurbished in 1981. It was reported, in August 2022, that the courthouse needed repairs expected to cost some £200,000 including a replacement boiler as well as a survey of the drainage system.

== See also ==
- List of listed buildings in Stranraer, Dumfries and Galloway
