= List of listed buildings in Stranraer, Dumfries and Galloway =

This is a list of listed buildings in the town of Stranraer in Dumfries and Galloway, Scotland.

== List ==
Name	Location	Date listed	Grid ref. (Note: Sometimes known as OSGB36, the grid reference (where provided) is based on the British national grid reference system used by the Ordnance Survey. • "Guide to National Grid". Ordnance Survey. • "Get-a-map". Ordnance Survey.)	Geo-coordinates	Notes	LB number (Note: Historic Environment Scotland assign a unique alphanumeric identifier to each designated site in Scotland, for listed buildings this always begins with "LB", for example "LB12345".)	Image
15 Bridge Street Including Boundary Walls And Gatepiers				54°54′14″N 5°01′36″W	Category B	45212	Upload another image See more images
8 And 10 Castle Street				54°54′16″N 5°01′33″W	Category C(S)	45214	Upload Photo
18 And 20 King Street				54°54′18″N 5°01′49″W	Category A	45230	Upload Photo
London Road, Westwood, Viewfield, And Woodside Cottage Including Boundary Walls, Gatepiers And Railings				54°54′12″N 5°00′43″W	Category C(S)	45234	Upload Photo
25 London Road Including Boundary Walls, Gatepiers, Gate And Railings				54°54′12″N 5°01′05″W	Category B	45237	Upload Photo
London Road, St Andrew's Church (Church Of Scotland) And Graveyard Including Boundary Walls, Gatepiers, Gates And Railings				54°54′11″N 5°01′15″W	Category B	45238	Upload another image See more images
45 And 47 London Road, Wenova And Merslaugh, Including Boundary Walls, Gatepiers, Gates And Railings				54°54′11″N 5°01′13″W	Category B	41762	Upload Photo
37 London Road, Helenslea Including Boundary Walls, Gatepiers, Gate Railings And Outhouse To Rear				54°54′11″N 5°01′10″W	Category B	41763	Upload Photo
14 King Street				54°54′19″N 5°01′49″W	Category B	41770	Upload Photo
Off Glebe Street, Park House Stables				54°54′14″N 5°02′07″W	Category B	41776	Upload Photo
49 George Street, George Hotel Including Postbox				54°54′16″N 5°01′41″W	Category B	41781	Upload another image See more images
58 George Street, The Golden Cross				54°54′17″N 5°01′42″W	Category C(S)	41787	Upload another image See more images
Lewis Street, Lewis Street Gospel Hall				54°54′07″N 5°01′37″W	Category B	41755	Upload another image See more images
2 Hanover Street				54°54′12″N 5°01′19″W	Category C(S)	41758	Upload Photo
49 London Road, Brunswick House Including Boundary Walls, Gatepiers, Gate And Railings				54°54′11″N 5°01′14″W	Category B	41761	Upload Photo
Ailsa Crescent, Darrochmhor Including Boundary Walls And Gatepiers				54°54′23″N 5°02′21″W	Category C(S)	45210	Upload Photo
15-21 (Odd Nos) Church Street				54°54′15″N 5°01′40″W	Category C(S)	45217	Upload Photo
65-67A George Street (Odd Nos) Including Boundary Walls				54°54′16″N 5°01′44″W	Category C(S)	45222	Upload Photo
77 Hanover Street And 1 Hanover Square				54°54′12″N 5°01′30″W	Category C(S)	45226	Upload another image See more images
4 And 6 Hanover Street				54°54′12″N 5°01′20″W	Category C(S)	45228	Upload Photo
Fisher Street, Wellington House And 5, The Cottage Including Boundary Walls, Gatepiers And Gates				54°54′19″N 5°01′37″W	Category B	41769	Upload Photo
Leswalt High Road, The High Kirk Of Stranraer (Church Of Scotland) Including Graveyard, Boundary Walls, Gatepiers, Gates And Railings				54°54′17″N 5°02′02″W	Category B	41774	Upload another image See more images
34-38 (Even Nos) George Street				54°54′17″N 5°01′39″W	Category C(S)	41782	Upload Photo
Church Street, Old Parish Church (Church Of Scotland) Including Lamp Standards				54°54′15″N 5°01′41″W	Category B	41743	Upload another image See more images
Dalrymple Street, Reformed Presbyterian Church And Church Hall Including Graveyard, Boundary Walls And Gatepiers				54°54′11″N 5°01′24″W	Category C(S)	45218	Upload another image See more images
57 Hanover Street				54°54′12″N 5°01′28″W	Category C(S)	45225	Upload Photo
25 Lewis Street Including Boundary Walls, Gatepiers, Gate And Railings				54°54′11″N 5°01′37″W	Category C(S)	45232	Upload Photo
Bridge Street, Stranraer Parish Church Hall Including Graveyard And Boundary Walls				54°54′13″N 5°01′37″W	Category C(S)	41764	Upload another image See more images
34 Bridge Street				54°54′14″N 5°01′39″W	Category C(S)	41750	Upload Photo
London Road, L'Aperitif (Formerly Ivy House)				54°54′11″N 5°01′18″W	Category B	41760	Upload another image See more images
Market Street, Harbour Office With Weighbridge				54°54′22″N 5°01′49″W	Category C(S)	49655	Upload Photo
8 And 10 Academy Street Including Boundary Walls, Railings And Gate				54°54′03″N 5°01′26″W	Category C(S)	45209	Upload Photo
9 Bridge Street, Former Grain Store Including Boundary Walls				54°54′13″N 5°01′34″W	Category B	45211	Upload Photo
12 And 14 Castle Street				54°54′15″N 5°01′33″W	Category C(S)	45215	Upload Photo
32 Charlotte Street				54°54′18″N 5°01′30″W	Category C(S)	45216	Upload Photo
45 And 47 George Street				54°54′16″N 5°01′40″W	Category C(S)	45221	Upload Photo
30 George Street				54°54′17″N 5°01′38″W	Category C(S)	45223	Upload Photo
89 And 91 Hanover Street				54°54′13″N 5°01′33″W	Category C(S)	45227	Upload Photo
8 And 10 George Street				54°54′17″N 5°01′36″W	Category C(S)	41766	Upload Photo
Glebe Street, Park House Gatepiers And Boundary Walls				54°54′15″N 5°02′07″W	Category B	41777	Upload Photo
23, 25 And 27 (Odd Nos) Church Street				54°54′15″N 5°01′39″W	Category C(S)	41748	Upload Photo
39 Lewis Street Including Boundary Walls				54°54′08″N 5°01′35″W	Category B	41754	Upload Photo
1 Academy Street Including Boundary Walls, Railings And Gate				54°54′02″N 5°01′24″W	Category B	41757	Upload Photo
South Strand Street, Fountain				54°54′16″N 5°01′42″W	Category C(S)	45220	Upload another image See more images
23 Lewis Street Including Boundary Walls And Gatepier				54°54′11″N 5°01′37″W	Category C(S)	45231	Upload Photo
London Road, Stair Park Gatepiers And Gates				54°54′13″N 5°00′49″W	Category C(S)	45236	Upload Photo
Springwell Road, Encliffe House Including Boundary Walls, Gates And Outhouse				54°54′19″N 5°02′11″W	Category C(S)	45241	Upload Photo
George Street And Castle Street, Stranraer Castle				54°54′16″N 5°01′34″W	Category A	41765	Upload another image See more images
11 Market Street				54°54′21″N 5°01′44″W	Category C(S)	41772	Upload Photo
Bellevilla Road, Anne House Including Outbuildings, Boundary Walls, Gatepiers, Gates And Railings				54°54′16″N 5°01′20″W	Category B	41783	Upload Photo
Lewis Street, Sheriff Courthouse Including War Memorial, Gatepiers And Boundary Walls				54°54′11″N 5°01′38″W	Category B	41785	Upload another image See more images
Lewis Street, St Ninian's Church (Church Of Scotland) Including Boundary Walls, Gatepiers And Gates				54°54′11″N 5°01′40″W	Category B	41786	Upload another image See more images
Church Street, Graveyard Including Boundary Walls And Gate				54°54′15″N 5°01′41″W	Category B	41744	Upload Photo
12 Church Street, Formerly Bank Of Scotland				54°54′14″N 5°01′41″W	Category B	41746	Upload Photo
6 Lewis Street Including Boundary Walls				54°54′12″N 5°01′40″W	Category B	41752	Upload Photo
21 Lewis Street Including Boundary Walls, Gatepiers, Gate And Railings				54°54′12″N 5°01′37″W	Category C(S)	41753	Upload Photo
London Road, Morland (Formerly Bowie Cottage) Including Boundary Walls And Gatepiers				54°54′11″N 5°01′19″W	Category C(S)	41759	Upload Photo
4 And 6 Bridge Street, The Grapes, Including Courtyard Outbuildings At Rear				54°54′14″N 5°01′33″W	Category C(S)	51120	Upload another image See more images
28 And 30 Harbour Street With Warehouse To Rear, Including Boundary Walls				54°54′20″N 5°01′35″W	Category B	41768	Upload Photo
85- 89 (Odd Nos) George Street				54°54′16″N 5°01′47″W	Category C(S)	41780	Upload Photo
55 George Street, Stranraer Museum Formerly Old Town Hall				54°54′16″N 5°01′42″W	Category A	41745	Upload another image See more images
10 Market Street				54°54′21″N 5°01′44″W	Category C(S)	41771	Upload Photo
31 Church Street				54°54′14″N 5°01′40″W	Category B	41749	Upload Photo
6 Academy Street Including Boundary Walls, Railings And Gate				54°54′03″N 5°01′25″W	Category C(S)	41756	Upload Photo
Broadstone Road, Briarbrae Including Boundary Walls, Gatepiers, Gate And Garage				54°54′46″N 5°02′30″W	Category C(S)	45213	Upload Photo
40-44 (Even Nos) George Street				54°54′17″N 5°01′40″W	Category C(S)	45224	Upload Photo
8 Hanover Street				54°54′12″N 5°01′21″W	Category C(S)	45229	Upload Photo
London Road, Stair Park Bandstand				54°54′12″N 5°00′45″W	Category B	45235	Upload Photo
17 North Strand Street				54°54′18″N 5°01′34″W	Category B	45239	Upload Photo
5 St John Street				54°54′17″N 5°01′26″W	Category C(S)	45240	Upload Photo
2-6 (Even Nos) George Street				54°54′17″N 5°01′35″W	Category C(S)	41767	Upload another image See more images
Off Glebe Street, Park House				54°54′15″N 5°02′07″W	Category B	41775	Upload Photo
5 And 7 High Street				54°54′17″N 5°01′50″W	Category C(S)	41779	Upload Photo
Church Street, Dunbae House, Including Boundary Walls, Gatepiers And Railings				54°54′14″N 5°01′42″W	Category B	41747	Upload Photo

== Key ==
The scheme for classifying buildings in Scotland is:

- Category A: "buildings of national or international importance, either architectural or historic; or fine, little-altered examples of some particular period, style or building type."
- Category B: "buildings of regional or more than local importance; or major examples of some particular period, style or building type, which may have been altered."
- Category C: "buildings of local importance; lesser examples of any period, style, or building type, as originally constructed or moderately altered; and simple traditional buildings which group well with other listed buildings."

In March 2016 there were 47,288 listed buildings in Scotland. Of these, 8% were Category A, and 50% were Category B, with the remaining 42% being Category C.
