= List of listed buildings in Inch, Dumfries and Galloway =

This is a list of listed buildings in the civil parish of Inch, in Dumfries and Galloway, Scotland.

== List ==
Name	Location	Date listed	Grid ref. (Note: Sometimes known as OSGB36, the grid reference (where provided) is based on the British national grid reference system used by the Ordnance Survey. • "Guide to National Grid". Ordnance Survey. • "Get-a-map". Ordnance Survey.)	Geo-coordinates	Notes	LB number (Note: Historic Environment Scotland assign a unique alphanumeric identifier to each designated site in Scotland, for listed buildings this always begins with "LB", for example "LB12345".)	Image
Inch Parish Church Including Monument To John Alexander, Graveyard, Gatepiers, Gates And Boundary Walls				54°54′04″N 4°57′51″W	Category B	10160	Upload Photo
Lochryan Lighthouse Including Ancillary Buildings				54°58′28″N 5°01′51″W	Category B	10169	Upload Photo
Lochinch Heritage Estate, Old Parish Church				54°54′24″N 4°57′42″W	Category B	10177	Upload Photo
Lochans Mill				54°52′00″N 5°00′21″W	Category C(S)	46671	Upload Photo
Lochryan Estate, Walled Gardens, Pavilions And Rabbit House				54°58′32″N 5°01′28″W	Category B	46693	Upload Photo
Lochinch Heritage Estate, Castle Kennedy Walled Garden				54°54′24″N 4°56′57″W	Category B	10157	Upload another image
Craigcaffie Farmhouse				54°56′10″N 4°58′57″W	Category C(S)	46669	Upload Photo
Lochinch Heritage Estate, Sundial To E Of Lochinch Castle				54°54′53″N 4°57′15″W	Category B	46689	Upload Photo
Lochryan Graveyard Including Mausoleum And Boundary Walls				54°58′37″N 5°01′49″W	Category C(S)	46692	Upload Photo
Greenloch House (Formerly Meadowsweet) Including Graveyard, Gatepier And Gate				54°53′13″N 4°57′47″W	Category B	10161	Upload Photo
Lochinch Heritage Estate, Castle Kennedy				54°54′26″N 4°56′56″W	Category A	10181	Upload another image See more images
Bloody Wheel Bridge				54°56′50″N 4°51′33″W	Category C(S)	46668	Upload Photo
Lochinch Heritage Estate, Black Stables Cottage				54°54′23″N 4°56′30″W	Category C(S)	46675	Upload Photo
Lochinch Heritage Estate, Garden Cottage				54°54′20″N 4°56′40″W	Category C(S)	46682	Upload Photo
Lochinch Heritage Estate, Castle Kennedy Gatepiers, Gates And Boundary Walls				54°54′21″N 4°56′43″W	Category B	10159	Upload Photo
Lochinch Heritage Estate, Ice House				54°55′30″N 4°57′39″W	Category C(S)	10165	Upload Photo
Duchra Farm, Gatepiers, Gates, Railings And Boundary Walls Only (Excluding Farmhouse And Steading)				54°52′00″N 5°01′08″W	Category C(S)	46670	Upload Photo
Lochinch Heritage Estate, Canal Cottage				54°54′26″N 4°56′43″W	Category C(S)	46676	Upload Photo
Lochinch Heritage Estate, Kennels Including Range, Boundary Walls And Railings				54°55′09″N 4°57′38″W	Category C(S)	46683	Upload Photo
Lochinch Heritage Estate, Sundial To Sw Of Lochinch Castle				54°54′51″N 4°57′27″W	Category C(S)	46690	Upload Photo
Lochinch Heritage Estate, Castle Kennedy Bridge				54°54′22″N 4°56′45″W	Category B	10158	Upload another image See more images
Craigcaffie Tower				54°56′06″N 4°59′06″W	Category A	10164	Upload Photo
Lochryan Estate, Lochryan House				54°58′33″N 5°01′36″W	Category A	10168	Upload another image
Lochinch Heritage Estate, Old Parish Church Graveyard Including Gatepiers, Gates, Railings And Boundary Walls				54°54′24″N 4°57′42″W	Category B	10178	Upload Photo
Lochinch Heritage Estate, Main Lodge				54°54′06″N 4°57′46″W	Category B	10180	Upload Photo
Lochinch Heritage Estate, Balker Lodge Including Steps, Gatepiers, Gate And Boundary Walls				54°55′22″N 4°57′56″W	Category C(S)	46673	Upload Photo
Lochinch Heritage Estate, Castle Kennedy Lodge Including Gatepiers And Gates				54°59′13″N 4°57′28″W	Category C(S)	46680	Upload Photo
Lochinch Heritage Estate, Kitchen Garden				54°54′25″N 4°56′45″W	Category B	46685	Upload Photo
Sundial To W Of Lochinch Castle				54°54′52″N 4°57′23″W	Category B	46688	Upload Photo
Lochryan Estate, Ancillary Structures, Dovecot, Sundial, Gatepiers And Boundary Walls				54°58′32″N 5°01′36″W	Category B	46694	Upload Photo
Lochinch Heritage Estate, Lochinch Castle Including Service Range, Bowling Alley, Boundary Walls And Gates				54°54′53″N 4°57′22″W	Category A	10179	Upload another image
Lochinch Heritage Estate, Lochinch Stable Court				54°54′55″N 4°57′19″W	Category B	46686	Upload Photo
Lochinch Heritage Estate, Balker Farmhouse				54°55′38″N 4°57′46″W	Category C(S)	46672	Upload Photo
Lochinch Heritage Estate, Black Loch Boathouse				54°54′44″N 4°57′24″W	Category C(S)	46674	Upload Photo
Lochinch Heritage Estate, Kennels House				54°55′09″N 4°57′36″W	Category C(S)	46684	Upload Photo
Lochinch Heritage Estate, Main Lodge Gatepiers, Gates And Boundary Walls				54°54′06″N 4°57′47″W	Category B	46687	Upload Photo
Cairnryan Old Manse Including Ancillary Structure, Gatepiers And Boundary Walls				54°58′27″N 5°01′33″W	Category B	10167	Upload Photo
Lochinch Heritage Estate, East Lodge Including Gatepiers And Gate				54°54′22″N 4°56′14″W	Category C(S)	46681	Upload Photo
Lochinch Heritage Estate, White Loch Boathouse				54°54′44″N 4°57′24″W	Category B	46691	Upload Photo

== Key ==
The scheme for classifying buildings in Scotland is:

- Category A: "buildings of national or international importance, either architectural or historic; or fine, little-altered examples of some particular period, style or building type."
- Category B: "buildings of regional or more than local importance; or major examples of some particular period, style or building type, which may have been altered."
- Category C: "buildings of local importance; lesser examples of any period, style, or building type, as originally constructed or moderately altered; and simple traditional buildings which group well with other listed buildings."

In March 2016 there were 47,288 listed buildings in Scotland. Of these, 8% were Category A, and 50% were Category B, with the remaining 42% being Category C.
