= Droughdool Mote =

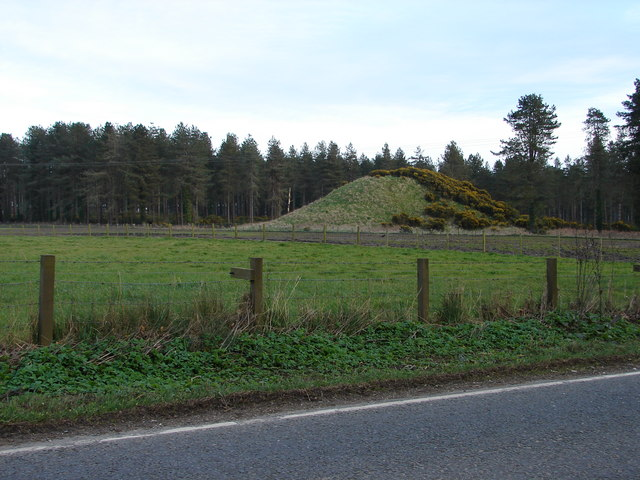
- The mound in 2008

- Location within Dumfries and Galloway
- 54.872171°N 4.8875013°W

Scheduled monument
- Designated: 29 September 1936
- Reference no.: SM2016

Droughdool Mote (also spelled Droughduil) (grid reference NX 14823 56865) is a Neolithic round mound in the parish of Old Luce, Wigtownshire, Dumfries and Galloway. The mound is oval in plan, measuring 60m by 50m at its base and rises to 10m in height. It is located 400m south of the late neolithic palisaded enclosure at Dunragit. It has been suggested that the mound may have been used as a viewing platform for activities at Dunragit complex of monuments. The most well known parallel the site has is Silbury Hill in Wiltshire, but is closer in size to the less well known sites at Conquer Barrow, Willy Howe and Wold Newton. The mound was originally built with stepped sides on top of a sand dune. Excavation between 1999-2002 revealed a round cairn at the top of the mound, similar to the nearby Mid Gleniron A.

The mound was assumed to be a medieval mote for a castle, but is different in structure and location to the motes in the surrounding area. In 2002, excavation and optically stimulated luminescence dating showed that the site was prehistoric, and probably placed within a date bracket associated with the Dunragit complex of monuments to the north. The site is still classified as a "motte (medieval)" on Canmore, the online database of ancient and historical monuments in Scotland.

The complex of Neolithic monuments at Dunragit was identified in 1992 by Marilyn Brown of the Royal Commission on the Ancient and Historical Monuments of Scotland from aerial photographs. When these cropmarks were examined within the wider landscape, it was found that the Droughdool Mote was aligned on the entrance to the middle of three concentric rings at the Dunragit site. While this alignment may be coincidental, other Neolithic flat topped mounds, such as Silbury Hill, Hatfield Barrow and Knowlton in Dorset, are also associated with nearby large enclosures. A feature of these other sites, missing from Droughdool, is a ditch surrounding the mounds which was often filled with water. However, during the Neolithic, the sea level was considerably higher than it is today and at high tide, an area between the mound and the Dunragit enclosure (the Whitecrook Basin) would have been inundated by sea. Thomas proposes that this may have obviated the need for a ditch at this site. Sites linked by water are well known from the Neolithic. The most famous of these is the connection between Durrington Walls and Stonehenge linked by the River Avon. Thomas speculates that:

"In the case of Dunragit and Droughduil, passing out of the enclosure along the entrance passage, and walking down into the Whitecrook Basin and then through the water before climbing the mound might have been understood as a journey of transition or transformation."

The site is a scheduled monument. It was excavated between 1999 and 2002 by Julian Thomas.
