= List of listed buildings in New Luce, Dumfries and Galloway =

This is a list of listed buildings in the civil parish of New Luce, in Dumfries and Galloway, Scotland.

== List ==
Name	Location	Date Listed	Grid Ref. (Note: Sometimes known as OSGB36, the grid reference (where provided) is based on the British national grid reference system used by the Ordnance Survey. • "Guide to National Grid". Ordnance Survey. • "Get-a-map". Ordnance Survey.)	Geo-coordinates	Notes	LB Number (Note: Historic Environment Scotland assign a unique alphanumeric identifier to each designated site in Scotland, for listed buildings this always begins with "LB", for example "LB12345".)	Image
Glenwhilly Farm And Farmhouse				55°00′11″N 4°51′33″W	Category C(S)	19376	Upload Photo
Main Water Bridge				54°56′39″N 4°51′12″W	Category B	19378	Upload Photo
Artfield, Farmhouse				54°57′30″N 4°45′19″W	Category C(S)	19372	Upload Photo
New Luce Parish Church, Graveyard, Graveyard Walls And War Memorial				54°56′30″N 4°51′02″W	Category B	19380	Upload Photo
New Luce, 1 And 3 Main Street				54°56′40″N 4°51′08″W	Category C(S)	19381	Upload Photo
Torwood House, Former Stables				54°56′18″N 4°44′33″W	Category C(S)	19389	Upload Photo
New Luce, 19 Main Street				54°56′38″N 4°51′07″W	Category C(S)	19382	Upload Photo
Lucewater House, Former Manse With Boundary Wall And Gatepiers				54°56′34″N 4°50′44″W	Category B	19377	Upload Photo
New Luce, 21 Main Street				54°56′40″N 4°51′08″W	Category C(S)	19383	Upload Photo
New Luce, 25 Main Street				54°56′40″N 4°51′08″W	Category C(S)	19384	Upload Photo
New Luce, 26 And 28 Main Street				54°56′35″N 4°51′07″W	Category C(S)	19386	Upload Photo
New Luce, 1 Smithy Lane				54°56′34″N 4°51′05″W	Category C(S)	19387	Upload Photo
New Luce, Station Road Building Opposite No 2				54°56′39″N 4°51′10″W	Category C(S)	19388	Upload Photo
Cross Water Bridge				54°56′35″N 4°51′06″W	Category B	19373	Upload Photo
Dirniemow Bridge				54°59′42″N 4°51′45″W	Category C(S)	19374	Upload Photo
Gass Farm				54°56′25″N 4°44′04″W	Category C(S)	19375	Upload Photo
Marklach, Footbridge				55°00′37″N 4°51′09″W	Category C(S)	19379	Upload Photo
Torwood Lodge				54°56′15″N 4°44′36″W	Category C(S)	19390	Upload Photo
New Luce, 2 Main Street				54°56′39″N 4°51′09″W	Category C(S)	19385	Upload Photo

== Key ==
The scheme for classifying buildings in Scotland is:

- Category A: "buildings of national or international importance, either architectural or historic; or fine, little-altered examples of some particular period, style or building type."
- Category B: "buildings of regional or more than local importance; or major examples of some particular period, style or building type, which may have been altered."
- Category C: "buildings of local importance; lesser examples of any period, style, or building type, as originally constructed or moderately altered; and simple traditional buildings which group well with other listed buildings."

In March 2016 there were 47,288 listed buildings in Scotland. Of these, 8% were Category A, and 50% were Category B, with the remaining 42% being Category C.
