= George Reid (Scottish artist) =

Scottish artist (1841–1913)

Sir George Reid FRSA
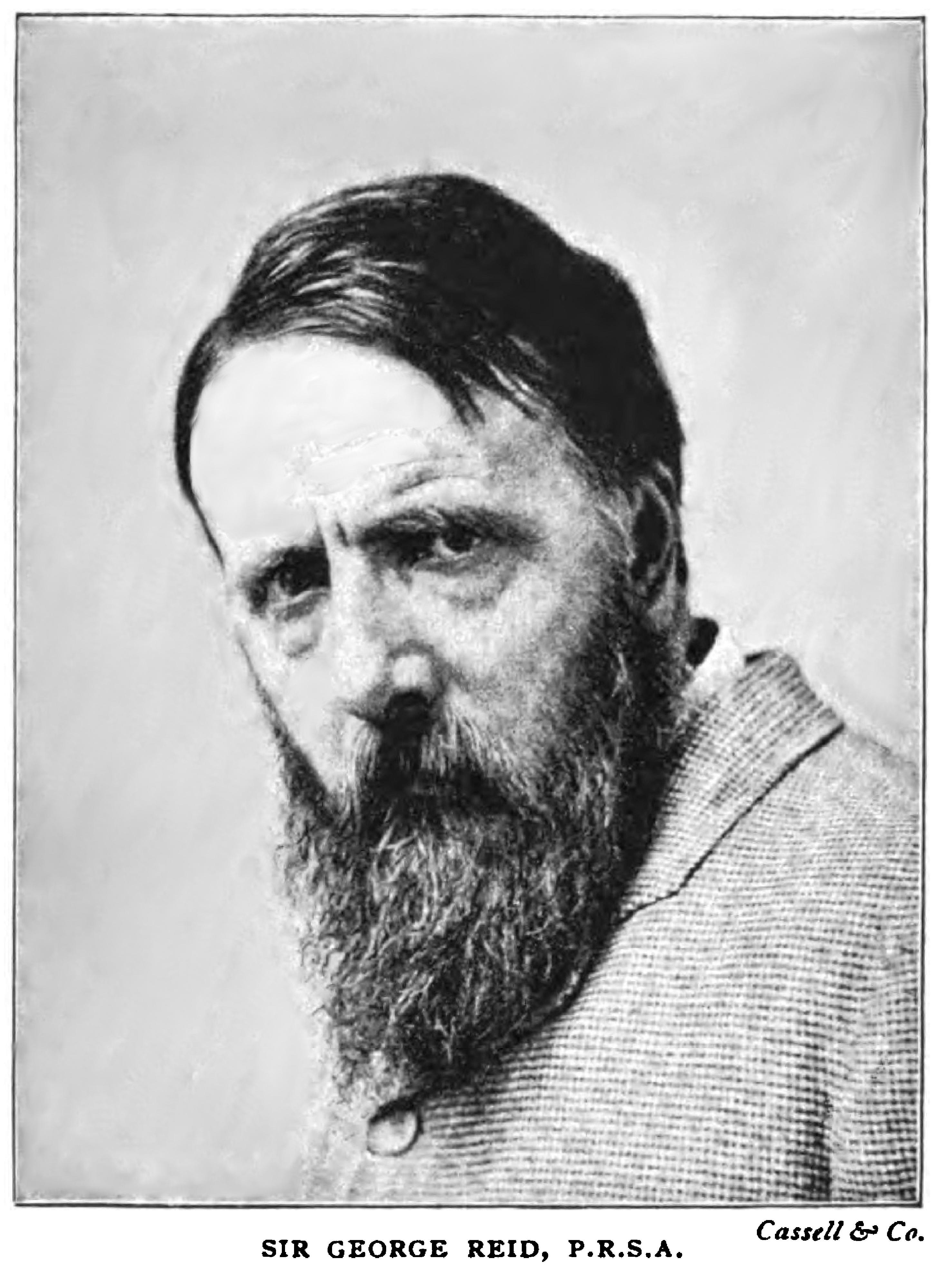
- Born: 31 October 1841; Aberdeen, Scotland
- Died: 9 February 1913 (aged 71); Somerset, England
- Known for: Paintings

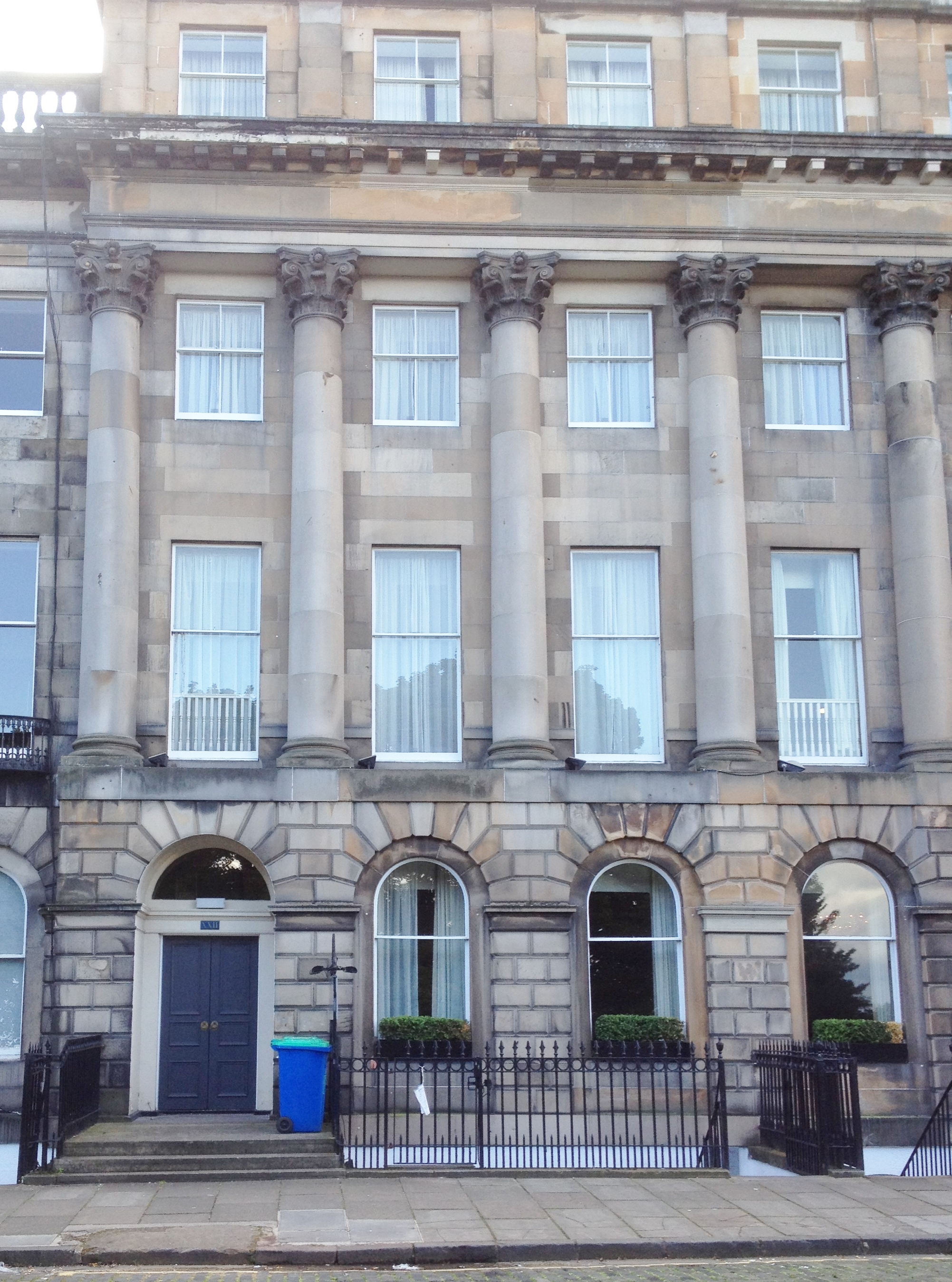
Reid's house at 22 Royal Terrace, Edinburgh

Sir George Reid PRSA (31 October 1841 – 9 February 1913) was a Scottish artist.

== Early life and education ==
Reid was born in Aberdeen in 1841, the son of George Reid (1803–1882) and his wife Esther Tait (1811–1892).

He developed an early passion for drawing, which led to his being apprenticed in 1854 for seven years to Messrs Keith & Gibb, lithographers in Aberdeen. In 1861 Reid took lessons from an itinerant portrait-painter, William Niddrie, who had been a pupil of James Giles, R.S.A., and afterwards entered as a student in the school of the board of trustees in Edinburgh.

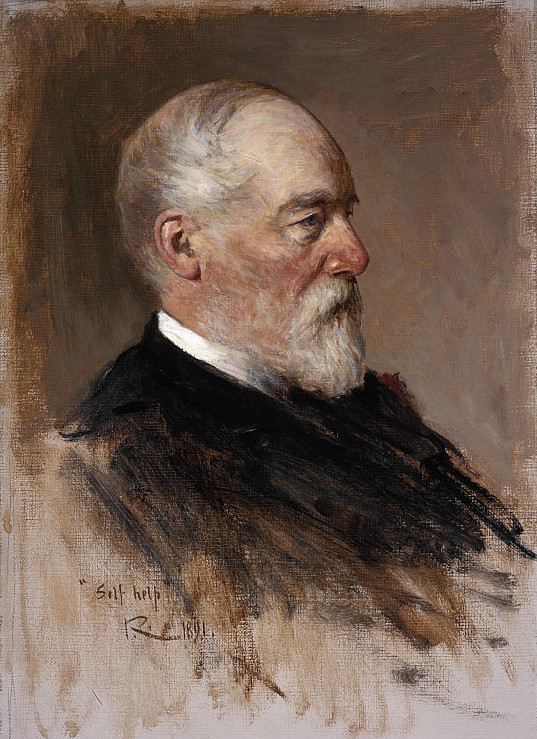
Samuel Smiles (1891) by George Reid

== Career ==
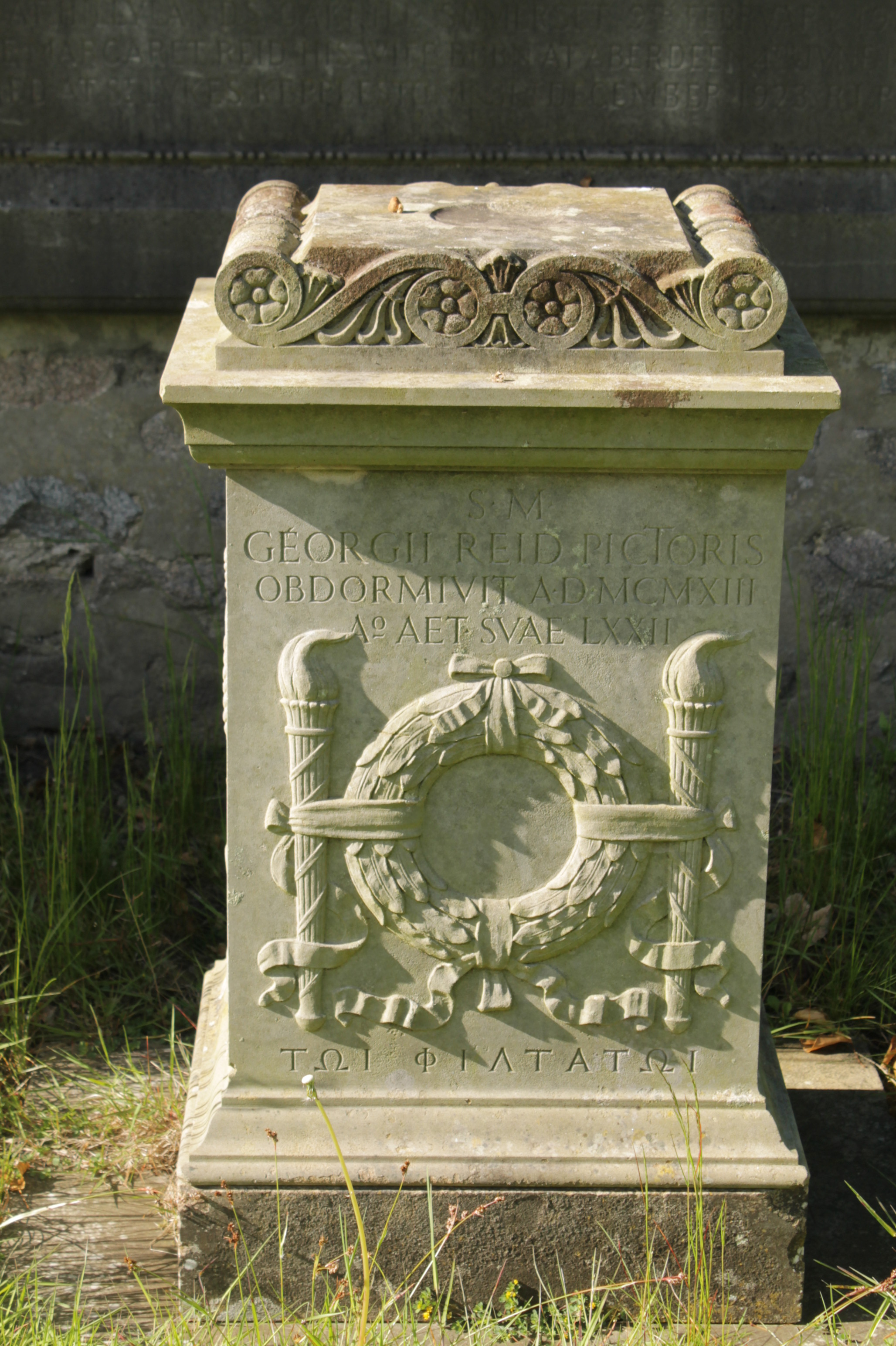
The grave of Sir George Reid, St Peters Cemetery, Aberdeen

Reid returned to Aberdeen to paint landscapes and portraits for any sum which his work could command. His first portrait to attract attention, from its fine quality, was that of George Macdonald, the poet and novelist (now the property of the University of Aberdeen). His early landscapes were conscientiously painted in the open air and on the spot. But Reid soon came to see that such work was inherently false, painted as it was day after day under varying conditions of light and shade. Accordingly, in 1865 he proceeded to Utrecht to study under Alexander Mollinger, whose work he admired for its unity and simplicity. This change in his method of viewing nature was looked on as revolutionary by the Royal Scottish Academy, and for some years his work found little favour in that quarter; but other artists gradually adopted the system of tone-studies which ultimately prevailed. Reid went to Paris in 1868 to study under the figure painter Adolphe Yvon; and he worked in 1872 with Jozef Israëls at The Hague. From this time forward, Reid's success was continuous and marked.

He showed his versatility in landscape, as in his Whins in Bloom, which combined great breadth with fine detail; in flower-pieces, such as his Roses, which were brilliant in rapid suggestiveness and force; but most of all in his portraits, which are marked by great individuality, and by insight into character. His work in black-and-white, his illustrations in brushwork of Edinburgh and its neighbourhood, and also his pen-drawings, about which it has been declared that "his work contains all the subtleties and refinements of a most delicate etching," are also noted works. Elected Associate of the Royal Scottish Academy in 1870, Reid attained full membership in 1877, and took up his residence in Edinburgh at 17 Carlton Terrace on Calton Hill, in 1882. In 1891 he was elected President of the academy - a post which he held until 1902. He received also the honour of a knighthood, and he was awarded a gold medal at the Paris Exhibition of 1900.

In later life he lived at 22 Royal Terrace on Calton Hill. He died in Somerset on 9 February 1913. His body was returned to Aberdeen, where he is buried with his parents in St Peter's Cemetery in the north of the city. The unusual Roman style memorial stands in front of a more traditional wall memorial on the north wall of the cemetery near the north-east corner.

== Known works ==
- Alexander Bain, University of Aberdeen
- Arthur James Balfour, University of Edinburgh
- Henry Calderwood, University of Edinburgh
- Portrait of James Edward Crombie FRSE, Aberdeen Art Galleries
- John Ritchie Findlay, Scottish National Portrait Gallery
- Robert Flint, University of Edinburgh
- Alexander Campbell Fraser, University of Edinburgh
- Alderman Sir James Hoy, Manchester Art Galleries
- David Masson, University of Edinburgh
- Robert Rainy, University of Edinburgh
- Very Rev Paton James Gloag (Gloag family)
- Peter Guthrie Tait, University of Edinburgh
- Sir John Usher of Norton and Wells, Usher baronets, University of Edinburgh
- Edith Mary Field, aged 15, oil painting dated 1873, Anthony J. Lester, FRSA
- James Franck Bright, DD, Master, University College, Oxford http://www.univ.ox.ac.uk/file/james-franck-bright
- Richard Claverhouse Jebb, Cambridge University
- Charles Chalmers, President of the Society of Advocates in Aberdeen
- James Drummond, Principal, Manchester College Oxford (forerunner of Harris Manchester College, Oxford)
- William Shore, Huntsman to the Duke of Buccleuch, hung at Bowhill House

== Family ==
His brothers, Archibald David Reid and Samuel Reid (born 1854), were also artists.

His wife Margaret (1840–1923) was also from Aberdeen.

== Portraits by artist ==
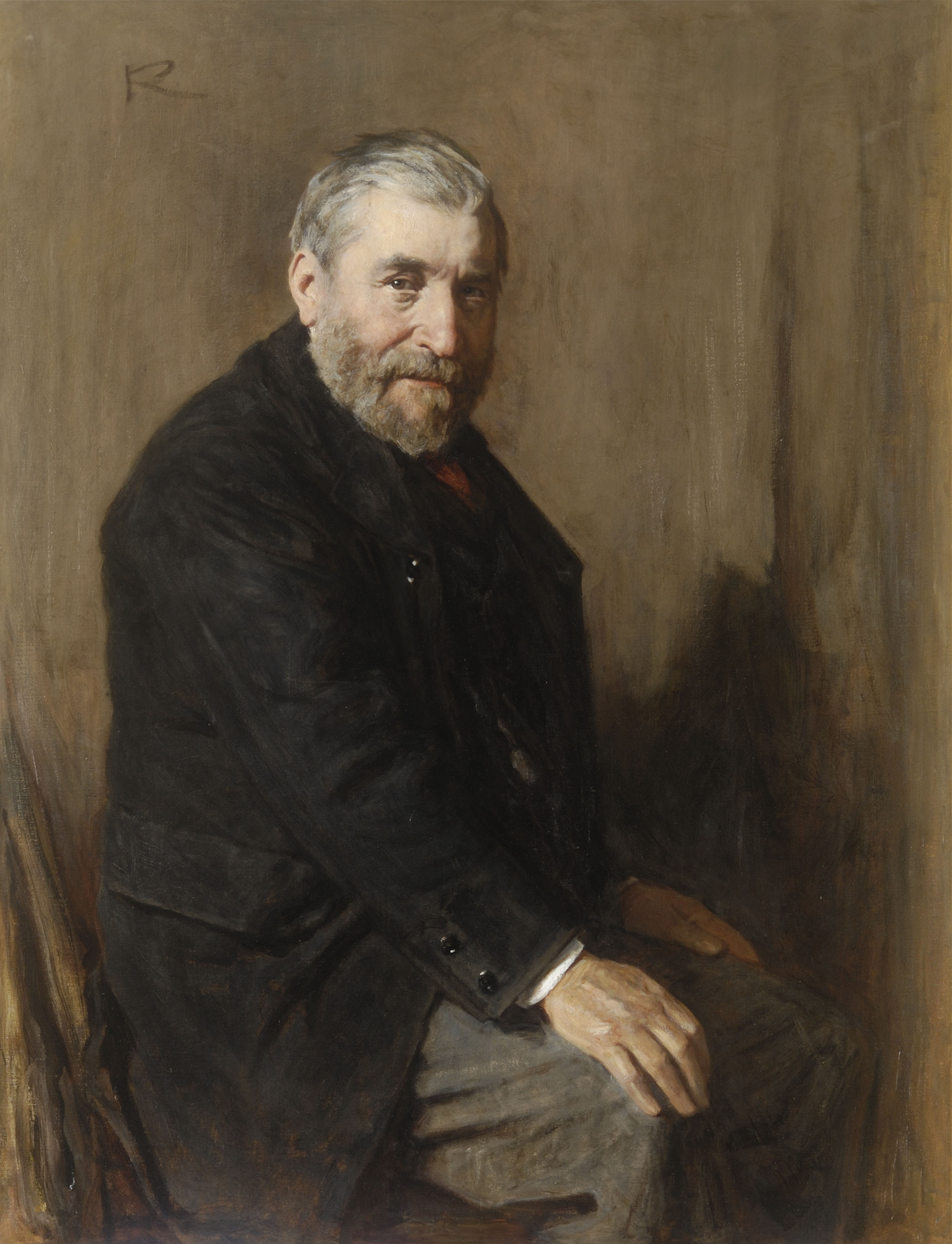
William Carnie (1897)

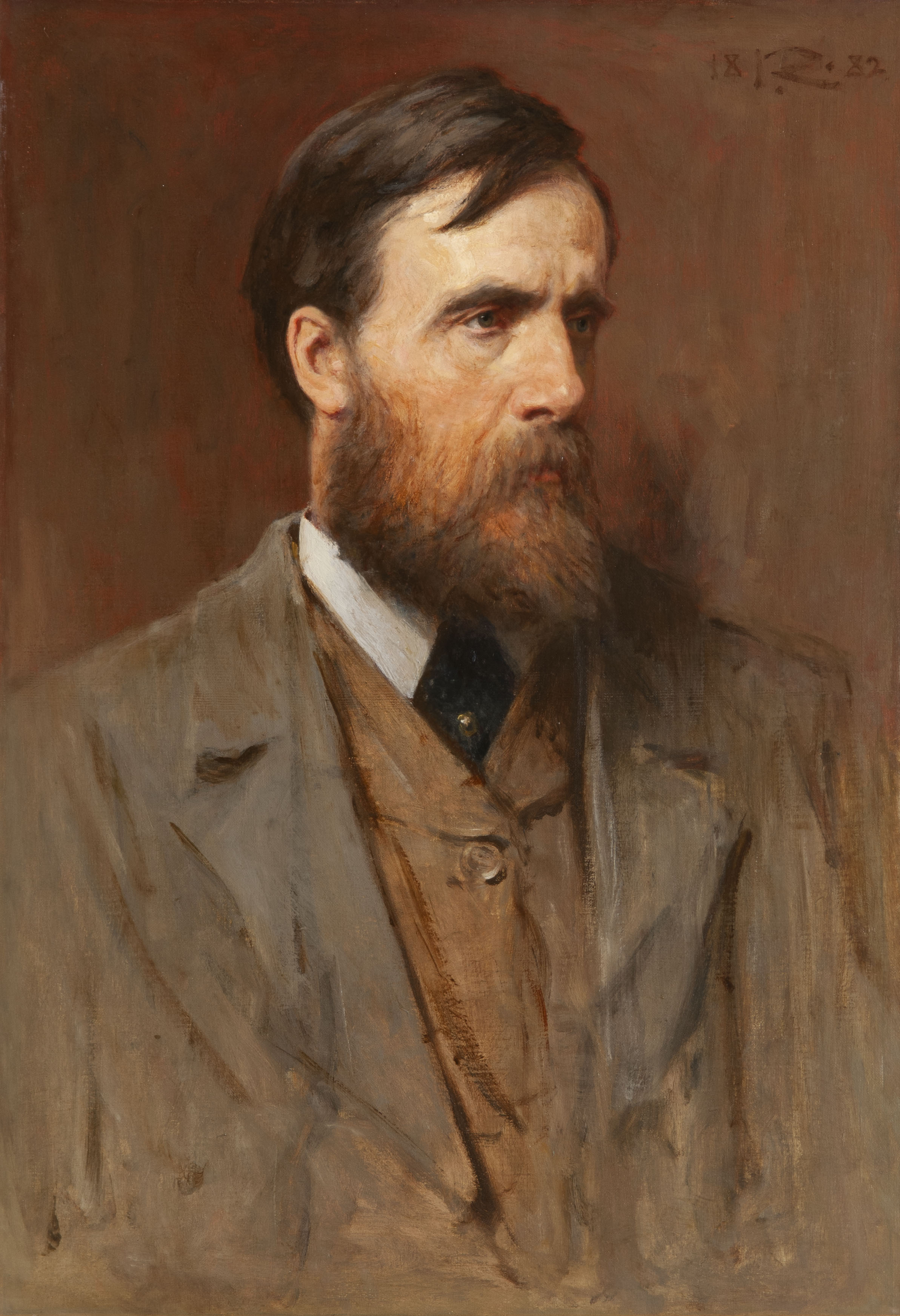
Self Portrait (1882)

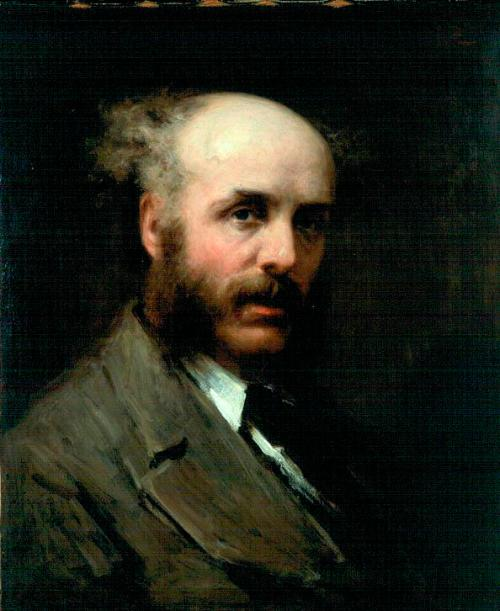
George Paul Chalmers RSA (1872)

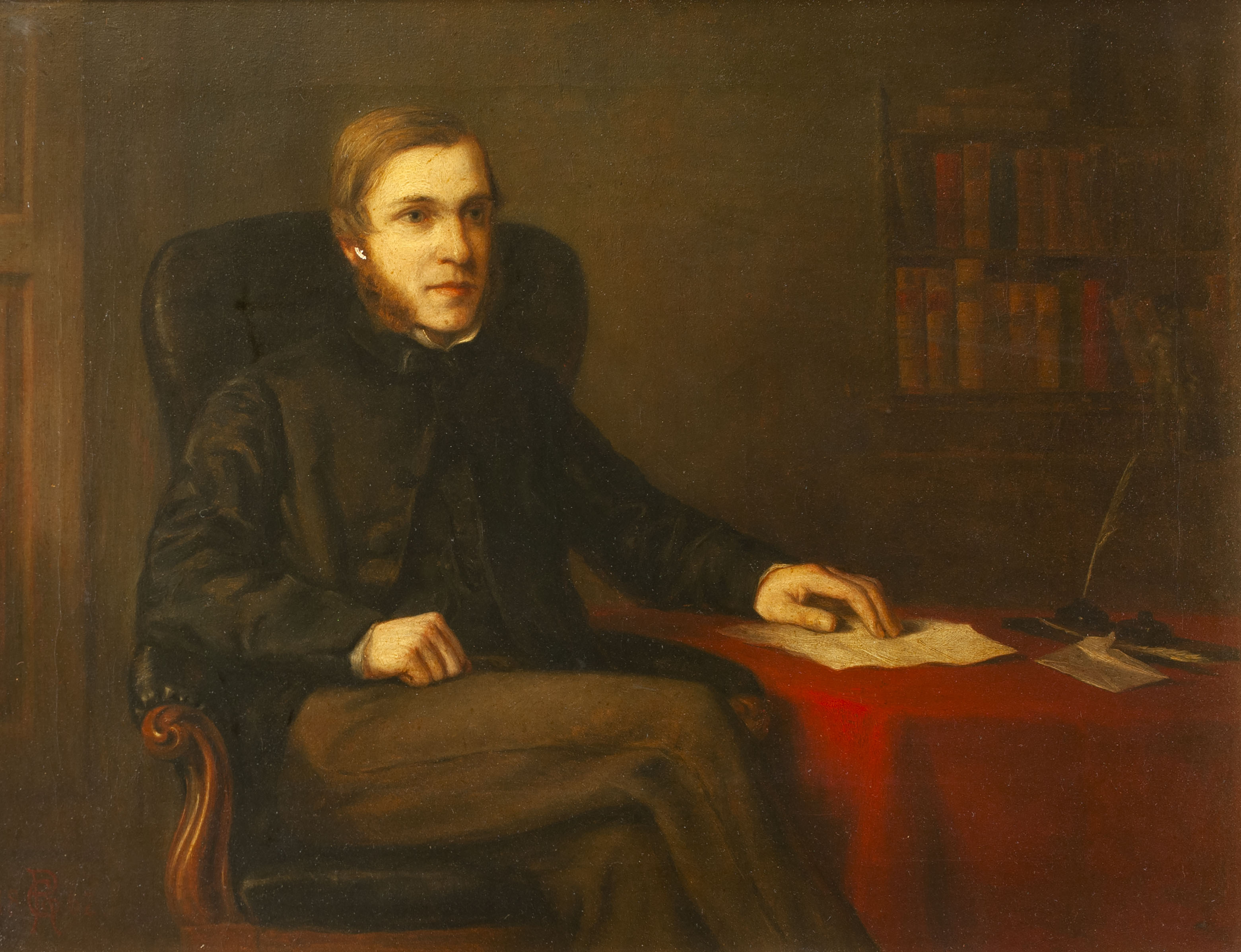
John Bulloch, Jnr (1862)

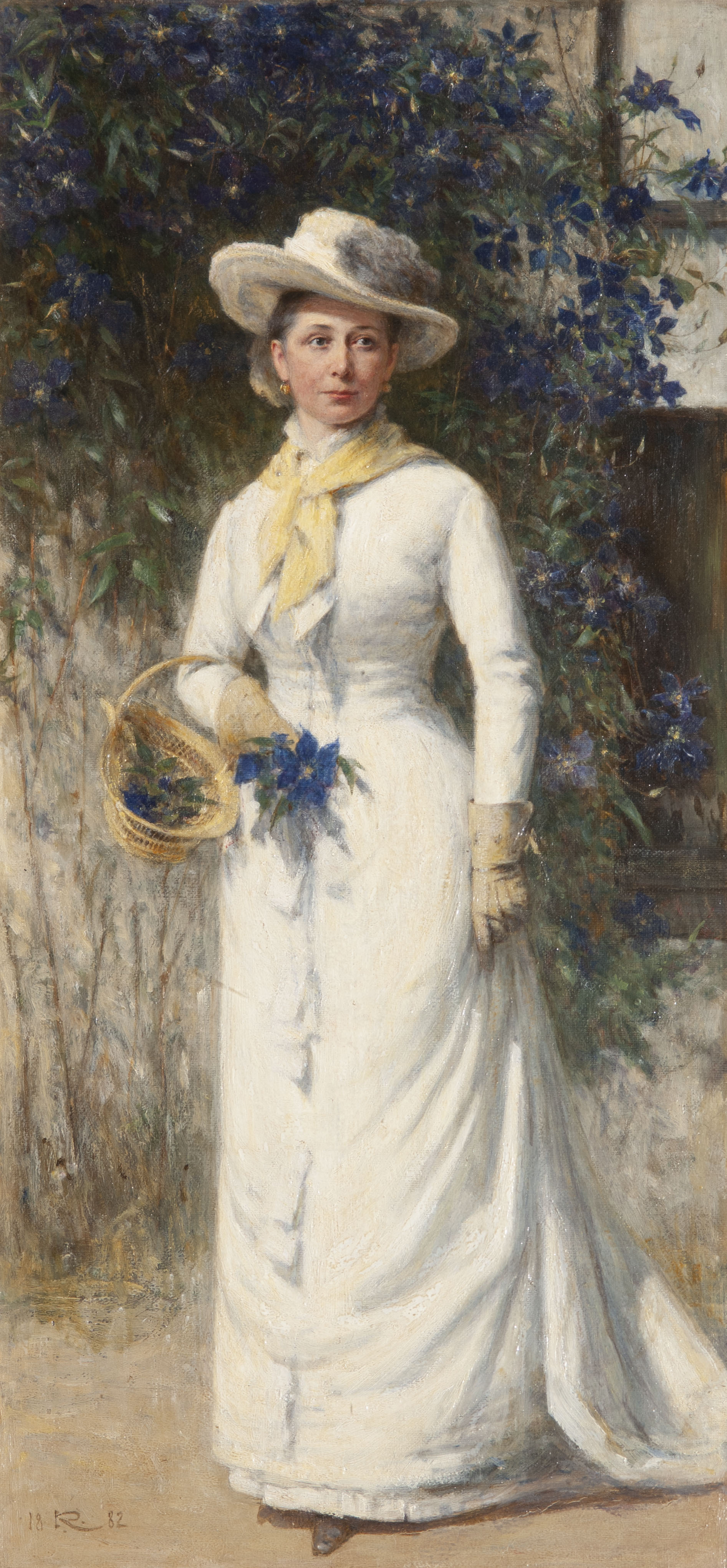
Mrs Macdonald (1882)

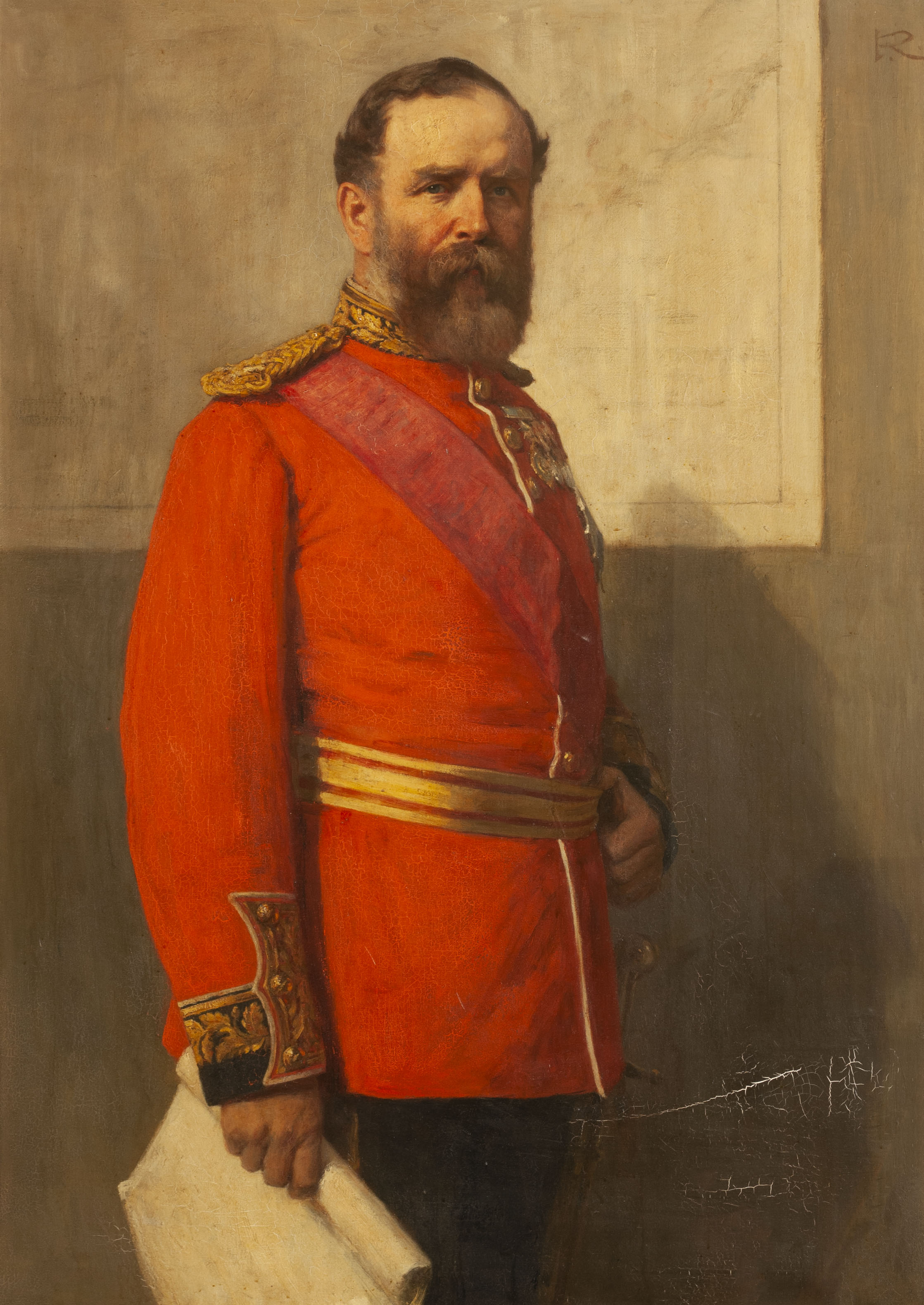
portrait of General Sir Peter Lumsden GCB, CSI, DL (1829-1918), (1886)
