= Mid Gleniron =

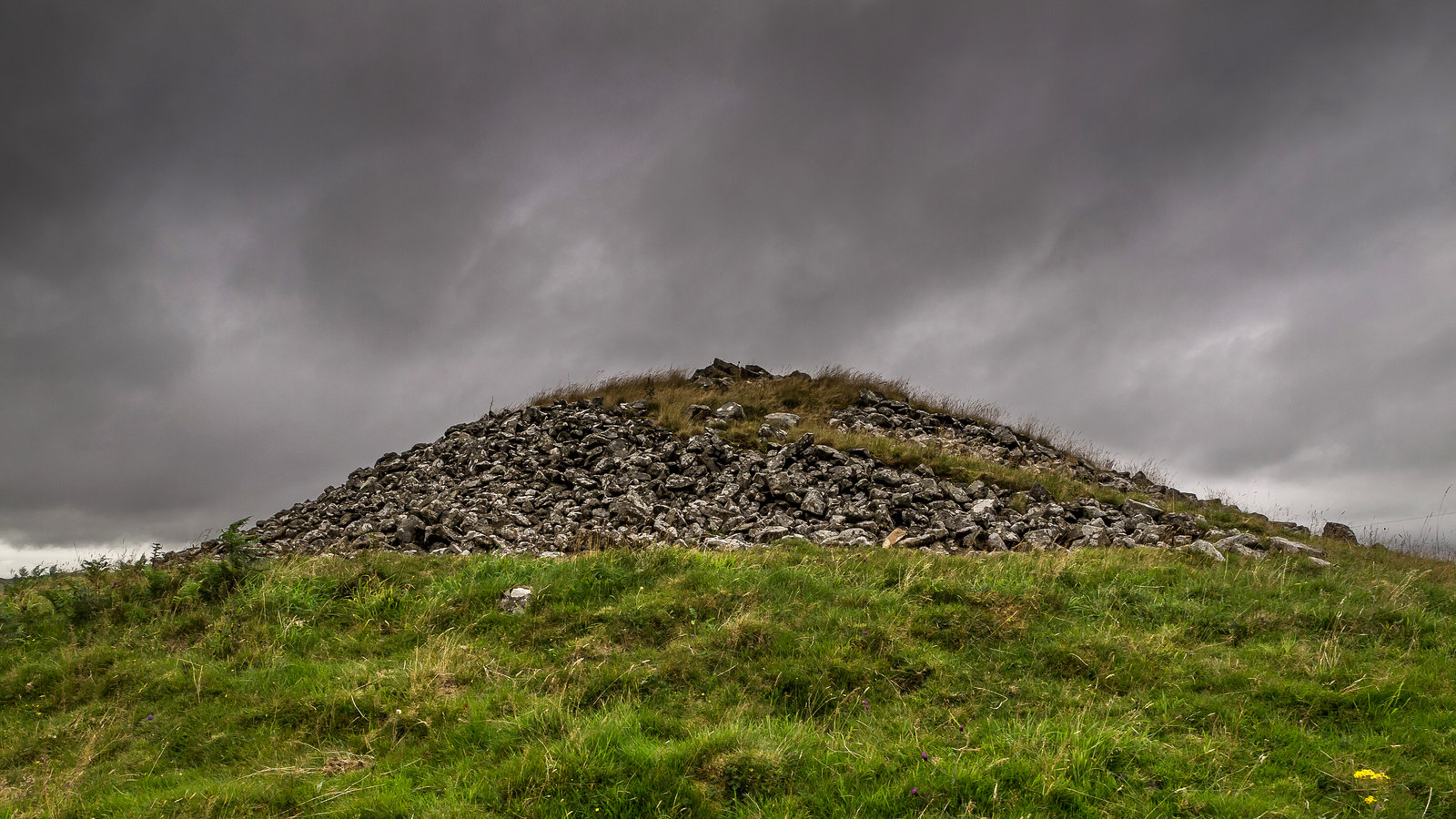
- One of the six cairns

- Location within Dumfries and Galloway
- 54.910121°N 4.828646°W,
- OS grid reference: NX 18769 60932

Scheduled monument
- Designated: 24/10/1924
- Reference no.: SM1944

Mid Gleniron is a prehistoric site in Dumfries and Galloway used in the Neolithic and Bronze Age. The site is a scheduled ancient monument that comprises a group of six burial cairns. Two of the cairns, Mid Gleniron I and Mid Gleniron II are chambered cairns of the Clyde tradition. These are of historical importance because of their multi-stage construction which provides evidence for the development of Clyde cairns at the beginning of the Neolithic period.

== Mid Gleniron I & II ==
The chamber cairns, Mid Gleniron I & II, were excavated by Corcoran between 1963 and 1966. These excavations revealed a multi-period construction. Mid Gleniron I was revealed to have been originally two separate, small (5m diameter) rectangular cairns, each with entrances into single chambers. These cairns were set in the same direction, with their cambers aligned. Thomas notes the close positioning of these two cairns implies that it was anticipated that they would be incorporated into a larger construction. At a later date, these cairns were modified and subsumed into a large trapezoidal cairn. A third chamber was added as well as a forecourt, typical of Clyde cairns. The facade marking out the forecourt was made of standing stones measuring over eight meters across.

Mid Gleniron II also apparently began as a set of two smaller cairns. Like at Mid Gleniron I, this site was transformed into a large trapezoidal cairn with a forecourt. However, only one of the cairns was subsumed and altered by the new monument. The forecourt led into a new chamber which was blocked centuries later in the early Bronze Age.

Historic Environment Scotland's Statement of National Importance for the site notes its potentially international significance for shedding light on "the sequence and development of funerary and ritual architecture during the Neolithic and early Bronze Age."

Excavation at Droughdool Mote between 1999 and 2002 revealed a round cairn at the top of the mound, similar in construction to Mid Gleniron A.
