= Archibald David Reid =

British painter

- Born: 8 June 1844; Aberdeen, Scotland
- Died: 13 August 1908 (aged 64); Wareham, England

Archibald David Reid (8 June 1844 – 13 August 1908) was a Scottish painter.

== Biography ==
He was born in Aberdeen on 8 June 1844, the fourth of five sons (in a family of thirteen children) of George Reid, manager of the Aberdeen Copper Company, by his wife Esther Tait. His older brother was Sir George Reid, president of the Royal Scottish Academy from 1891 to 1902, and his youngest brother was Samuel Reid, R.S.W. At the age of ten Reid entered Robert Gordon's Hospital, now Gordon's College, Aberdeen, which he left at fourteen for a mercantile career. The friendly and cultivated influence of John F. White, LL.D., miller, in whose counting-house he was employed, and the example of his brother George, drew him to artistic pursuits. Modelling and painting engaged his leisure. There were then no studios in Aberdeen, and his earliest practical training in art was received at the old Mechanics' Institute.

Abandoning commerce at twenty-three, Reid went to Edinburgh to attend the classes of the Trustees' Academy, and, later, the life-class of the Royal Scottish Academy. He remained three years in Edinburgh. He first exhibited at the Scottish Academy in 1870, and his contributions to its exhibitions of 1873-4 were specially remarked for their predisposition to tone. A visit to the Netherlands, which he paid in 1874, lastingly affected his art. Four years later he went to Paris, and for a short time worked in Julien's studio. Next, with a commission from Dr. White, he visited Spain. In 1892 he was elected A.R.S.A., and five years afterwards a member of the Royal Institute of Painters in Oils, from which body, however, he soon resigned. He was also a member of the Royal Scottish Society of Painters in Watercolours. His work was rarely exhibited in London galleries.

Reid travelled much, as the titles of his pictures show: 'On the Giadecca, Venice’ 'A Court in the Alhambra,' 'The Scotch House, Campvere,' ’Auxerre, France,' the last of which was well reproduced in colours in the 'Studio' ('Royal Scottish Academy Number,' 1907). He always, however, kept closely in touch with his native city, which he made his permanent home. At one time he had a studio in King Street there, but afterwards he used those at his brother's residence at St. Luke's, Kepplestone, which he occupied for some years before his death. Besides a natural predilection for Dutch art, he shared the friendship of many modern Dutch masters with his brother George, who had early in life studied under Jozef Israëls. Reid enjoyed also a long intimacy with George Paul Chalmers [q. v.], who painted many pictures in the Reids' studio.

Reid undertook a few commission portraits, the most masterly of them perhaps that of John Colvin, the sacrist at King's College, Aberdeen, where the picture now hangs; but landscapes and the scenery of his native shores were his main themes. Two of his sea-pieces are included in the Macdonald Bequest at Aberdeen. A large picture, 'A Lone Shore,' exhibited at the Royal Academy in 1875, was purchased for 300l. after his death by some friends and presented to the Aberdeen Art Gallery. Of his works in private collections may be mentioned a 'Harvest Scene' (Glasgow Loan Exhibition, 1878), 'Guessing the Catch,' and ' Before Service,' a view of the interior of King's College Chapel, Aberdeen, with figures of monks introduced. Towards the end of his Life Reid produced many landscapes in charcoal. He etched a few plates, and some black-and-white illustrations by him are to be found in the files of 'Life and Work.'

An accomplished musician and possessed of a fine literary taste, Reid was a popular member of the Aberdeen club known as the 'New Deer Academy ' (see Memories Grave and Gay, by John Kerr, LL.D., pp. 221–8). When out walking at Wareham, Dorsetshire, on 30 August 1908, he died suddenly of heart failure, and was buried in St. Peter's Cemetery, Aberdeen. He married in 1893 Margaret, daughter of George Sim, farmer, of Kintore, who survived him without issue. A portrait painted by himself is in the Macdonald Bequest at Aberdeen.
