= Old Town Hall, Stranraer =

Municipal building in Stranraer, Scotland

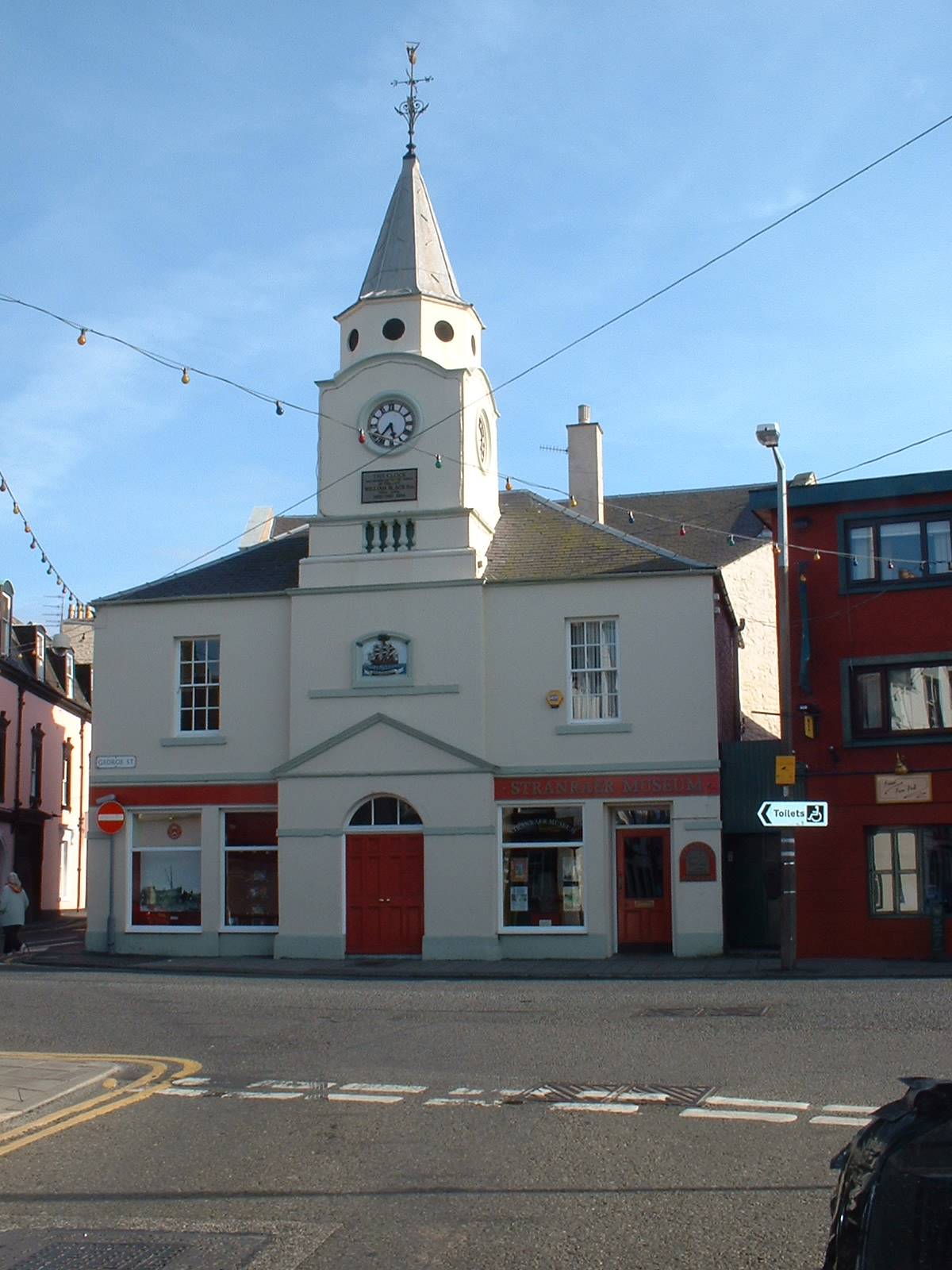
- Old Town Hall, Stranraer

- Shown in Dumfries and Galloway
- 54.9044°N 5.0283°W
- Location: George Street, Stranraer

History
- Built: 1776

Site notes
- Architect(s): Edward Wallace and Thomas Hall
- Architectural style: Neoclassical style

Listed Building – Category A
- Official name: Old Town Hall, George Street, Stranraer
- Designated: 20 July 1972
- Reference no.: LB41745

The Old Town Hall is a municipal structure in George Street, Stranraer, Dumfries and Galloway, Scotland. The structure, which is used as a local history museum, is a Category A listed building.

== History ==
The first municipal structure in Stanraer was a tolbooth which was built on part of the local parish churchyard and dated back to the late 17th century: the tolbooth was the host to an Irish pirate known as "Mccairty" who was captured off the coast of Kirkcudbrightshire and imprisoned there in 1699. By the 1770s, the tolbooth was very dilapidated and the burgh leaders decided to demolish it and replace it with a new town hall on the same site.

The new building was designed and built by Edward Wallace and Thomas Hall in the neoclassical style, built in rubble masonry with a stucco finish and was completed in June 1776. The design involved a symmetrical main frontage with three bays facing onto George Street; the central bay, which slightly projected forward, featured a doorway with a fanlight and a pediment above; on the first floor there was a panel showing the burgh coat of arms which depicted a ship with three sails and the motto "Tutissima Statio" (English: "The safest station"). The outer bays were fenestrated with sash windows on the first floor, while the central bay was surmounted by a tower, with a parapet and a balustrade in the first stage, an octagonal belfry in the second stage and a spire with a weather vane above. Internally, the principal rooms were the guardhouse and the lock-up on the ground floor and the debtors' prison, which was later converted for use as a council chamber, on the first floor. The building was extended to the rear to accommodate a corn exchange and a courtroom in 1855.

After the council relocated to new premises in Lewis Street in 1874, the old town hall was briefly used as a drill hall and armoury for the 2nd Wigtownshire Rifle Volunteer Corps, and was then used as the home of the Athenaeum Club, before being taken over by the fire service in 1879. A clock, which was presented to the town by a former town clerk, William Black, was installed in the tower in 1936. The fire service eventually relocated from the town hall to a new purpose-built fire station in Lewis Street in 1960. The Stranraer Museum, which by the middle of the 20th century had built up a substantial collection of axes and other archaeological exhibits, then established itself in the building. Other significant items which were added to the collection included an 18th-century plough, as well as a variety of items relating to the polar explorers, Sir John Ross, and his nephew, James Clark Ross.

Works of art in the building include a painting by Henry John Dobson depicting an old lady spinning, and a painting by George Pirie depicting a boy with a terrier and pups, as well as landscape paintings by Alexander Brownlie Docharty, George Houston and Archibald David Reid.

== See also ==
- List of listed buildings in Stranraer, Dumfries and Galloway
- List of Category A listed buildings in Dumfries and Galloway
