= Lochans, Dumfries and Galloway =

Coordinates: 54.866389°N 5.013233°W

Lochans: Scottish Gaelic: Na Lochan
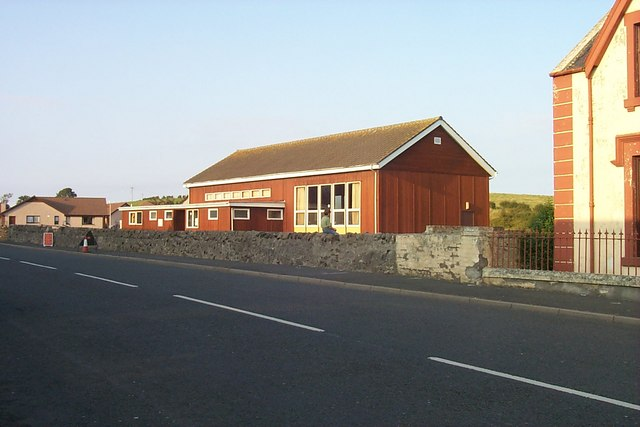
- Primary school

- Location within Dumfries and Galloway
- Council area: Dumfries and Galloway
- Lieutenancy area: Wigtown
- Country: Scotland
- Sovereign state: United Kingdom
- Post town: Stranraer
- Postcode district: DG9
- Dialling code: 01776-Unknown
- Police: Scotland
- Fire: Scottish
- Ambulance: Scottish
- UK Parliament: Dumfries and Galloway
- Scottish Parliament: Galloway and Upper Nithsdale

Lochans is a small village around 2.5 miles (4.0 km) south of Stranraer, in Dumfries and Galloway in south-west Scotland. In 1971 it had a population of 355.

== Areas of historic significance ==
In the 19th century, Lochans Mill was a small two-storey range. The walls are made with stone rubble and the mill roofed with slate. In the late 1700s, this building was built as meal mill. The wheel at the side is made from cast iron and has six spokes mounted on a cast-iron axle; it is 3.66 m (12 ft) in diameter by 1.37m (4 1/2 ft) wide. Everything inside the mill has been removed, so there is no machinery. "Lochan" is the Gaelic word for a small loch.

== Glaciology ==
Lochans are also used by a variety of scientists in the field of glaciology. Lochans are simply lakes, ponds or small concentrated rivers which are located on high rise glaciers or in open-wide plains. Not to be confused by tarns, kettle ponds, or truncated spurs, lochans are much more concentrated and use up a smaller area.
