= Castle of St John =

16th-century tower house in Scotland

Coordinates: 54°54′16″N 5°01′34″W

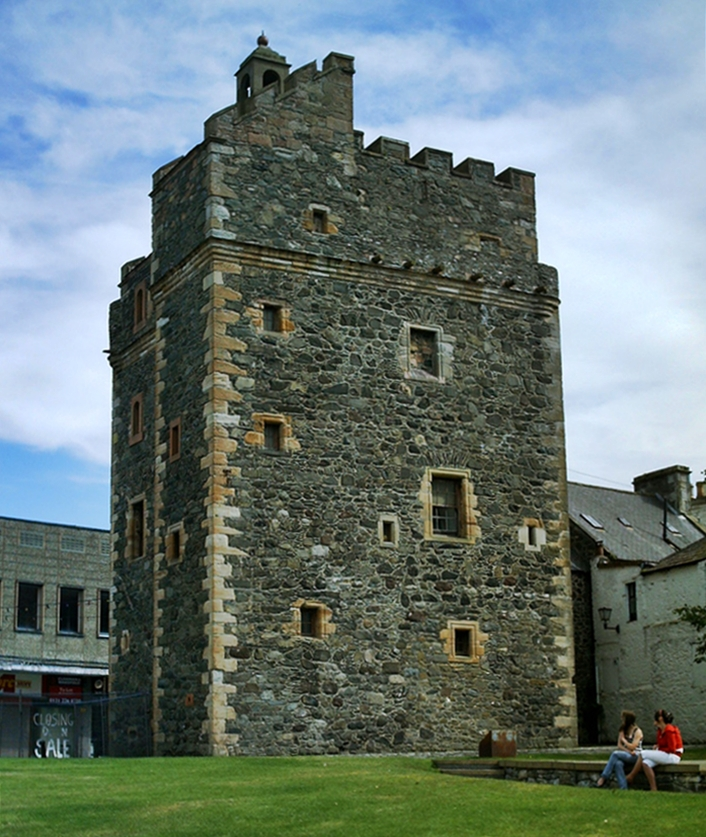
Castle of St John

The Castle of St John, also known as Stranraer Castle, is an early 16th-century L-plan tower house in the centre of Stranraer, in Dumfries and Galloway, southwest Scotland. It was built by the Adairs of Kilhilt (who originally came from Ireland) c. 1510. It has been used as a home, a court, a police station and as a military garrison during the "Killing Times" of Covenanter persecution in the 1680s. During the Victorian era, the castle was modified to serve as a prison, and it was used as an ARP base during the Second World War. The castle was refurbished in the late 1980s and is now a museum.
