= Mochrum =

Coordinates: 54.80°N 4.56°W

- Location within Dumfries and Galloway
- Council area: Dumfries and Galloway
- Lieutenancy area: Wigtown
- Country: Scotland
- Sovereign state: United Kingdom
- Post town: Newton Stewart
- Postcode district: DG8
- Police: Scotland
- Fire: Scottish
- Ambulance: Scottish
- UK Parliament: Dumfries and Galloway
- Scottish Parliament: Galloway and Upper Nithsdale

Mochrum (/ˈmɔːxrʌm/) is a coastal civil and Church of Scotland parish situated to the east of Luce Bay on the Machars peninsula and 8 miles (13 km) southwest of Wigtown and in the historical county of Wigtownshire in Galloway, Scotland. It covers 22,000 acres (8,900 ha) and is approximately 10 miles (16 km) in length and 5 miles (8.0 km) in breadth. The parish contains the eponymous village of Mochrum, as well as Port William and the clachan of Elrig.

== Etymology ==
Mochrum is recorded as Mochrumm in Blaeu as a hill-name. It is a Cumbric name formed of the elements moch 'pigs, swine' and drum 'ridge'. It is possible, but unlikely, that the name is Gaelic rather than Cumbric, formed of the cognate elements muc-druim.

== Kirk of Mochrum ==
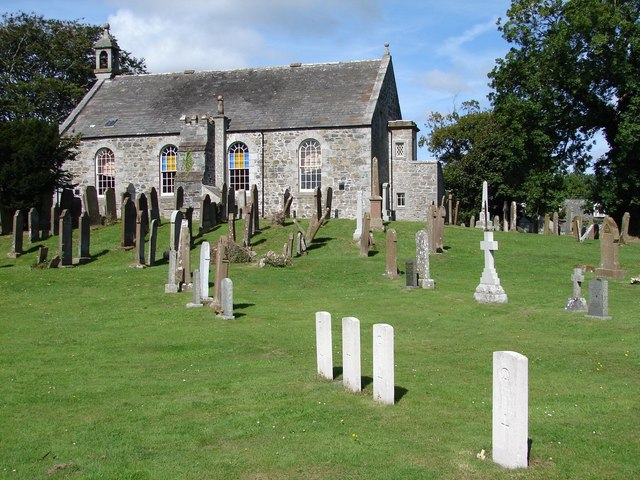
Mochrum kirk

Mochrum kirk was built on the site of a previous church building dating back to the 12th century. The former building was largely destroyed by fire in the 1770s, and the current building used most of the former building's rectangular walls in its construction in 1794, and was substantially altered again ca. 1840.

The churchyard contains ten war graves, of which four male and one female are unknown.

== History ==
Sir John Dunbar of Mochrum was killed at the Battle of Flodden in 1513. He was survived by his wife Janet Stewart, and his third son Gavin Dunbar (1490-1547), became Archbishop of Glasgow in 1524. A fortified mediaeval manor house is located at Castle Island, also called Drumwalt.

Myretoun McCulloch was owned by the McCullochs, and in 1574 they had the 5-merkland of Balsalloch in the "Barony of Myretoun". Myretoun Castle is on the Monreith Estate, on the border of Mochrum and Glasserton parishes. It was owned by Sir William Maxwell, and then the Maxwells built Monreith House. Myrtoun Castle was built on an earlier motte, but was there also a castle and motte on the island.

== Archaeology ==
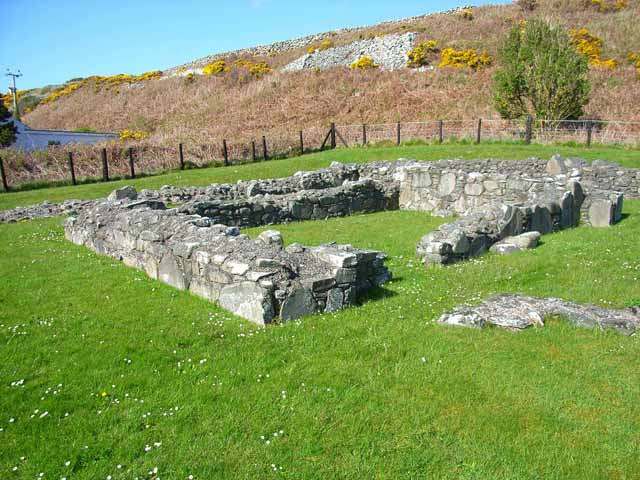
The remains of Chapel Finian

Mochrum is the site of numerous prehistoric forts, earthworks, standing stones, and crannógs

About 1 mile (1.6 km) from Monreith is Barsalloch Point, where evidence of human encampments as early as 6000 BC may make it the oldest dated settlement in Galloway.

Barsalloch Iron Age fort at Mochrum, as well as both early and medieval crosses. There is another Iron Age hill fort at Doon of May hill fort.

The foundations are all that is left of Chapel Finian, a 10th-11th-century chapel standing on an old raised beach at Corwall Port. It most likely takes its name from Saint Finnian who was educated at nearby Whithorn and died ca. 579 AD. The site was probably a landing place for Irish pilgrims to Saint Ninian's shrine. It is shown on Timothy Pont's map in Blaeu's Atlas, as "Chappel finan".

Druchtag Motehill is a steep-sided mound and site of a 12th-century motte-and-bailey castle, lying about 100 metres (330 ft) north west of Mote Brae. The Old Place of Mochrum was built in 1368.

A crannog is in Elrig Loch. A standing stone, the Carlin Stone, can be found on The Derry, near to the head of Elrig Loch. The ruins of a mediaeval chapel can be found at Barhobble, which is near to the House of Elrig.

== See also ==
- List of listed buildings in Mochrum, Dumfries and Galloway

== Gallery ==
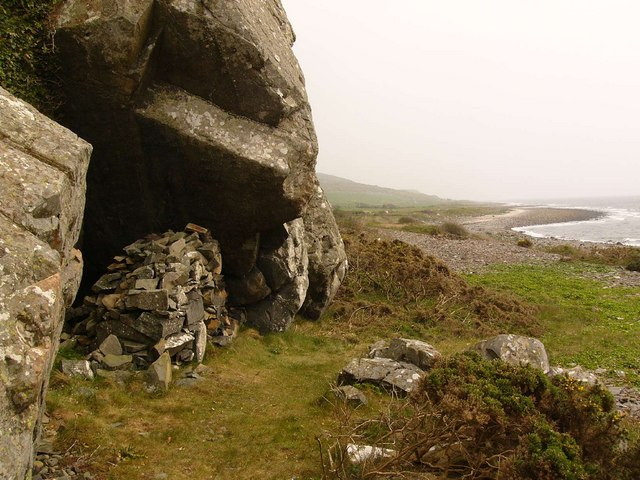
Garheugh Cave

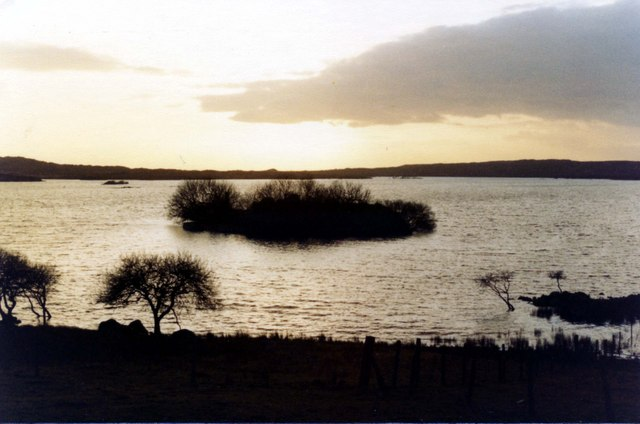
Castle Island, Castle Loch

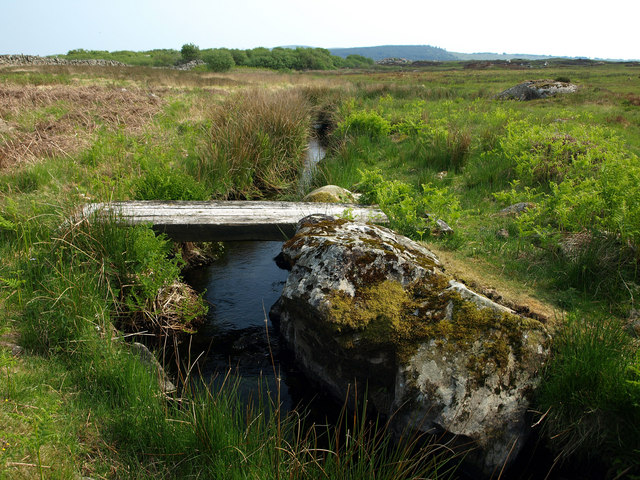
Castle Loch Burn flows from Castle Loch into Mochrum Loch

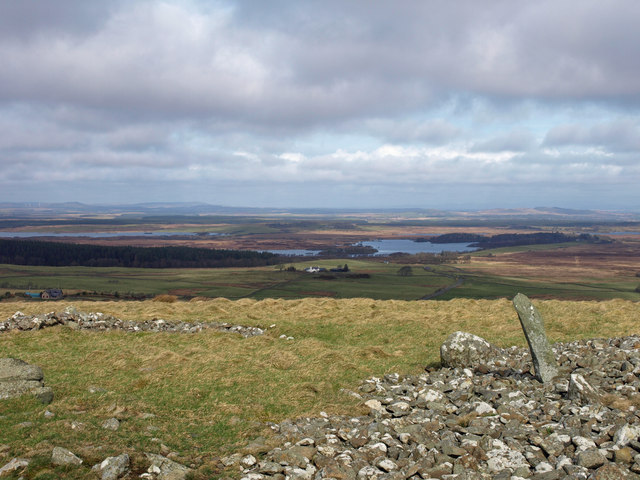
Bronze Age cairn on Mochrum Fell

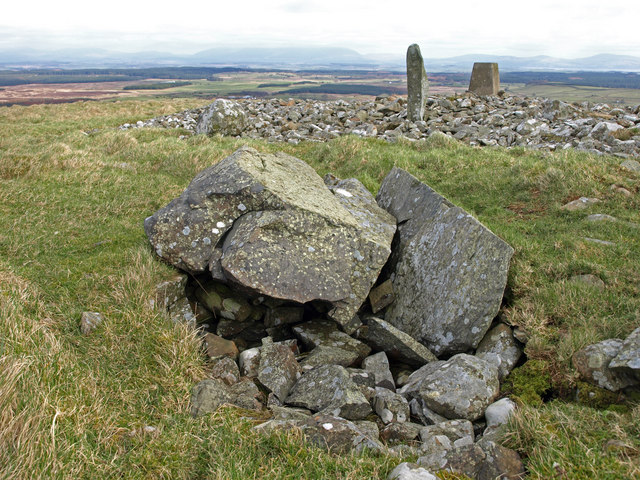
Burial cist on Mochrum Fell

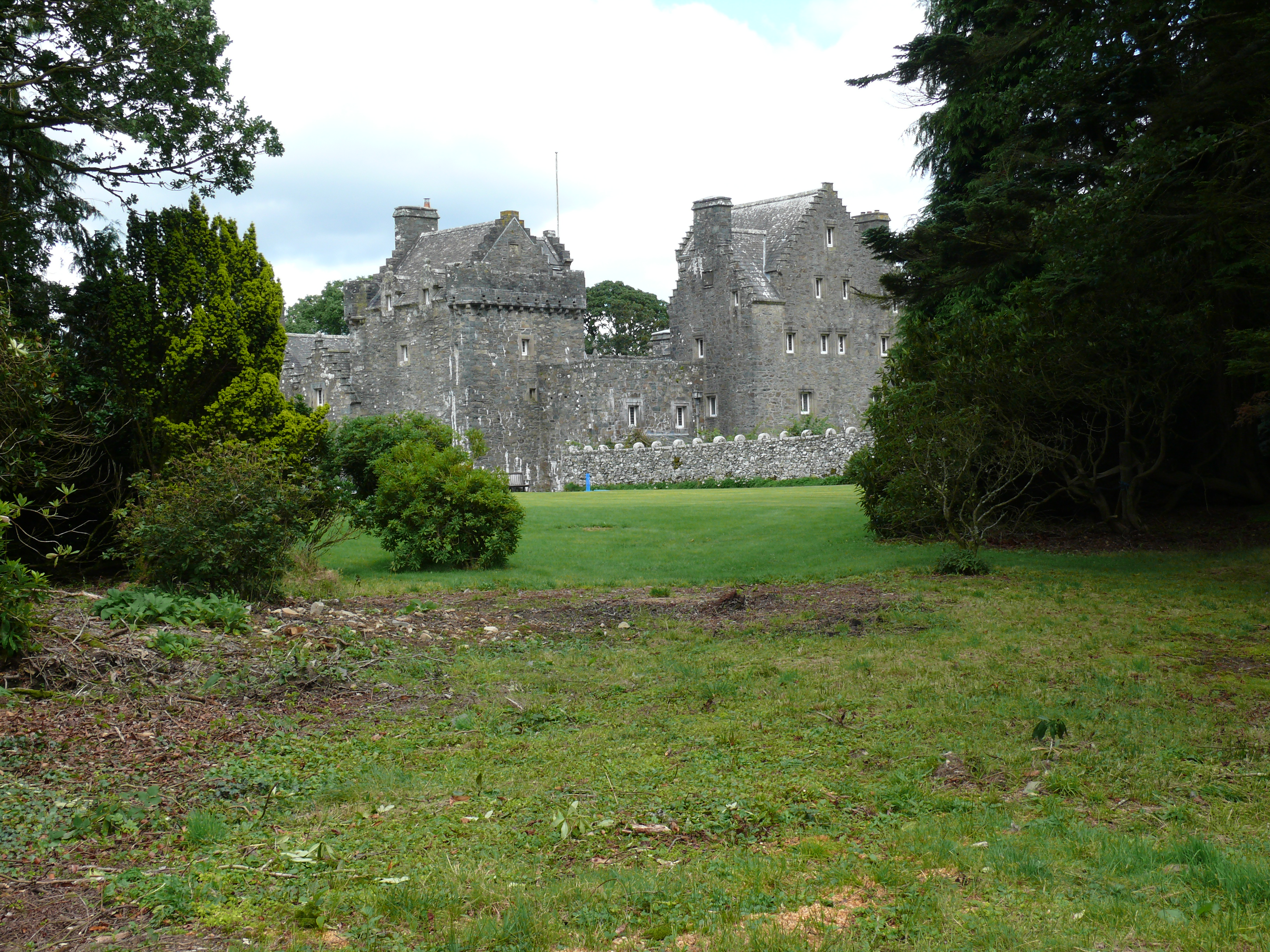
Old Place of Mochrum, Drumwalt

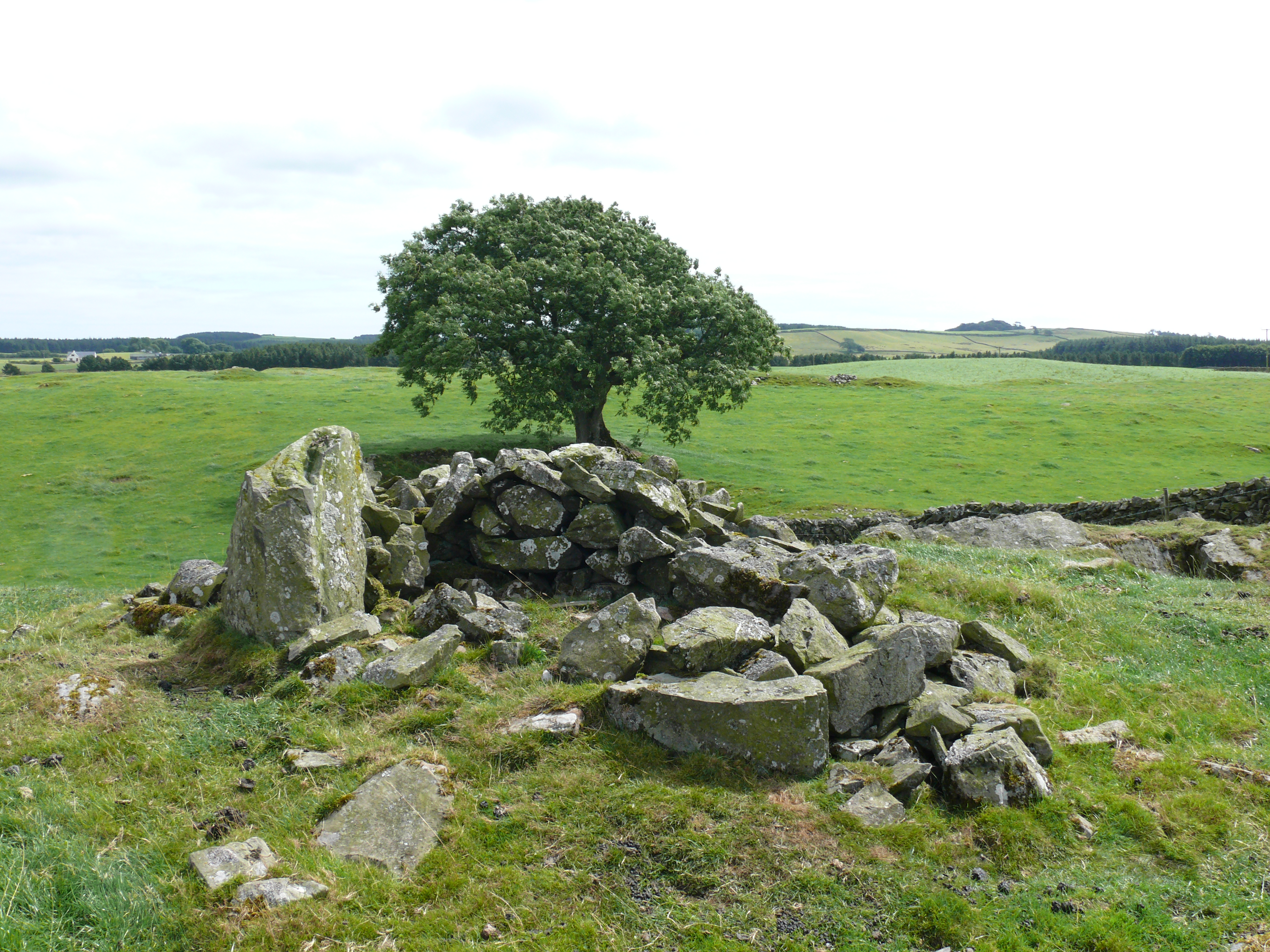
Mote of Crailloch and site of chapel on the right

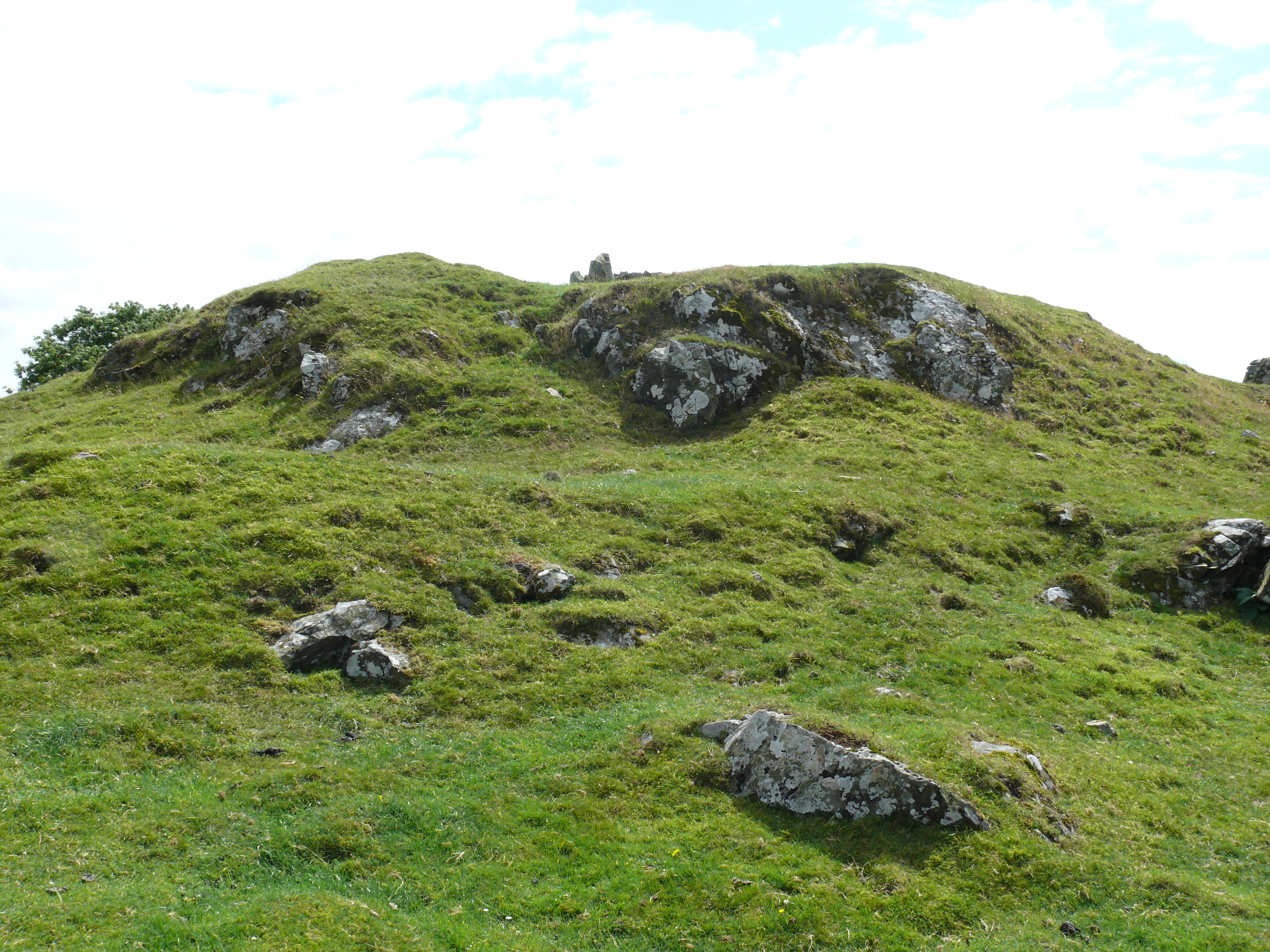
View from the base of Mote of Crailloch

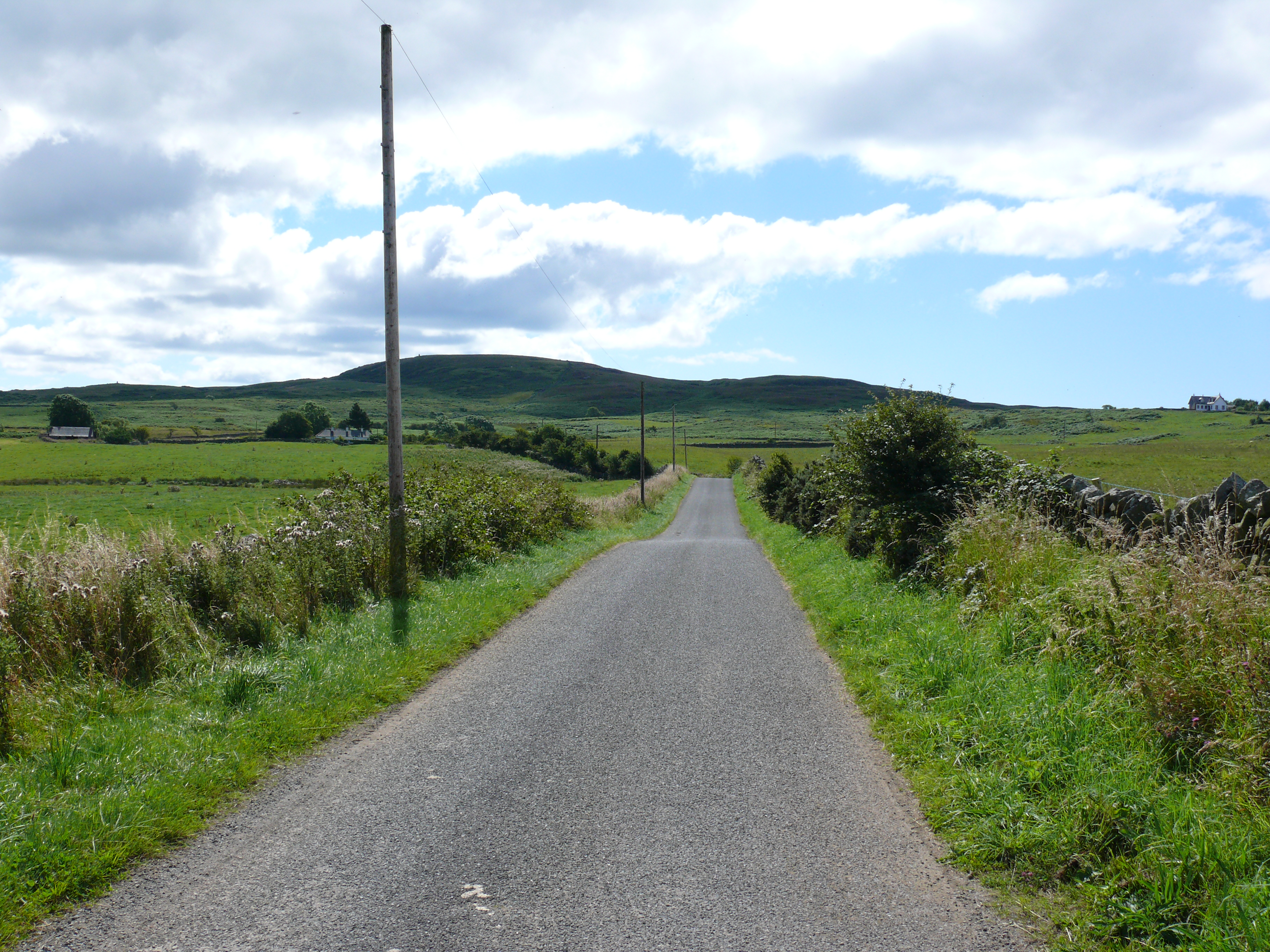
view of Mochrum Fell

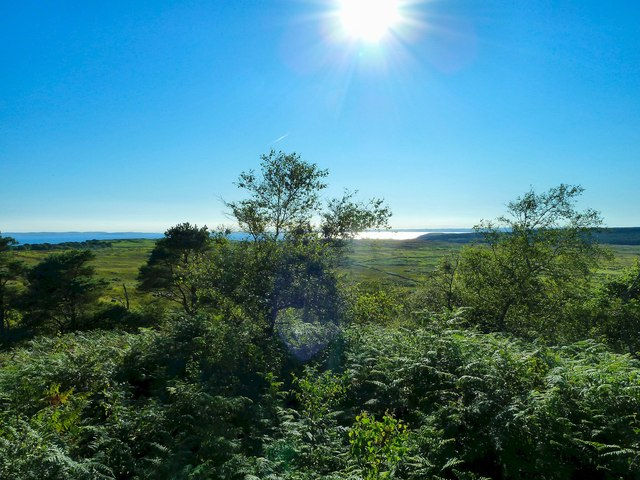
Iron Age Hill Fort, Doon of May

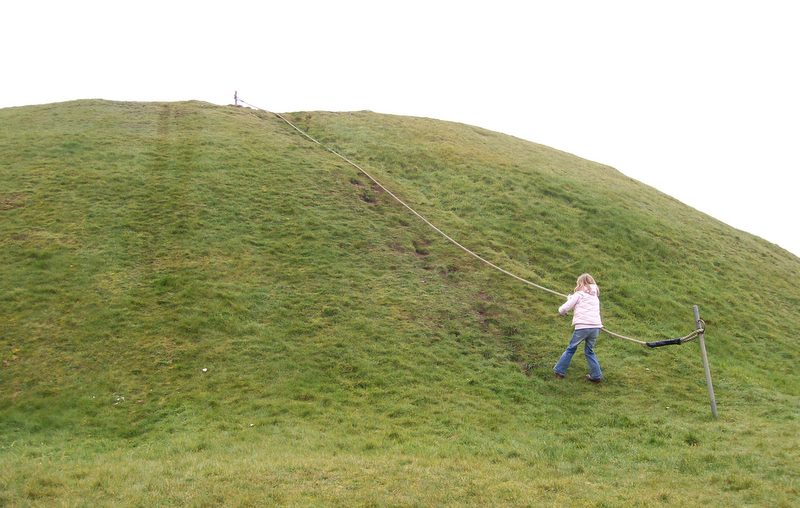
Mote of Druchtag

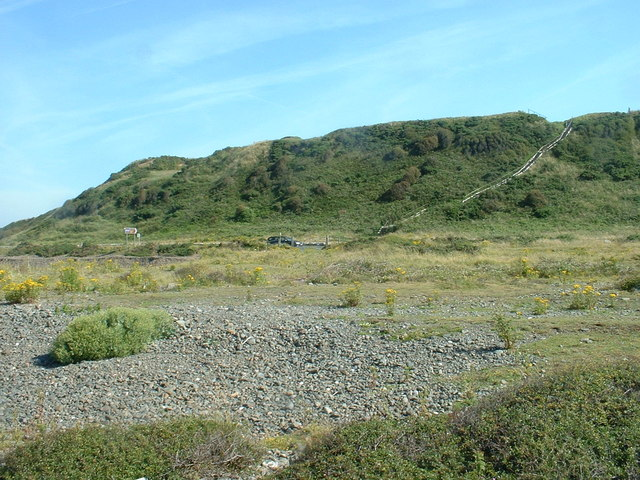
Steps to Barsalloch Fort Iron-Age Settlement

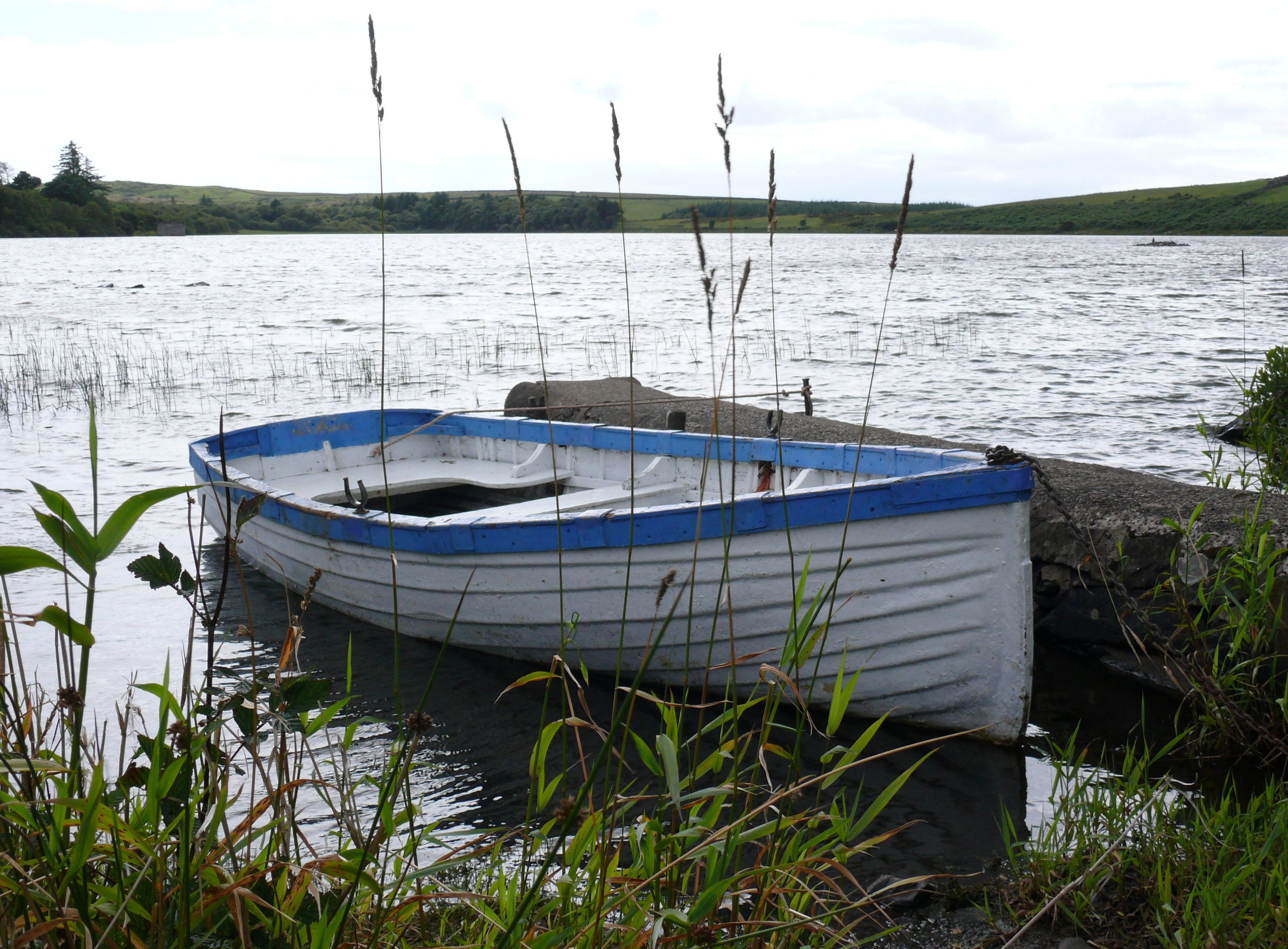
Elrig Loch crannog on the right
