= Castle Loch =

Castle Loch is the name of multiple lakes in Scotland:

- Castle Loch – loch (lake) in Scotland, Dumfries and Galloway, Port William community council area
- Castle Loch – loch (lake) in Scotland, Dumfries and Galloway, Lochmaben community council area
