= The Autobiography of a Super-Tramp =

1908 book by W. H. Davies

- Oxford University Press 1980 cover
- Author: William Henry Davies
- Language: English
- Genre: Autobiographical novel
- Publisher: A. C. Fifield, London
- Publication date: 1908
- Media type: Print (hardcover)
- ISBN: 9781908946072

The Autobiography of a Super-Tramp is an autobiography published in 1908 by the Welsh poet and writer W. H. Davies (1871–1940). A large part of the book's subject matter describes the way of life of the tramp in the United Kingdom, Canada and the United States in the final decade of the 19th century.

== Publication history ==
The book was written in the space of six weeks, "a great achievement for a first book by a man with the minimum of education."

George Bernard Shaw had become interested in Davies, a literary unknown at the time, and had agreed to write a preface for the book, largely through the efforts of Shaw's wife Charlotte. It was only because of Shaw that Davies' contract with the publishers was re-written to allow the author to retain the serial rights, all rights after three years, royalties of fifteen per cent of selling price and a non-returnable advance of £25 (equivalent to £2,600 in 2017). Davies was also to be given a say on the style of all illustrations, advertisement layouts and cover designs. The original publisher, Duckworth and Sons, refused to accept these demands and so the book was placed instead with Fifield. Shaw was also instrumental in keeping the unusual title of the book, of which Davies himself was unsure, and which later proved to be controversial with some reviewers.

The book was the third published by Davies, having been preceded by The Soul's Destroyer (1905) and New Poems (1907). The 1920 edition of the book concludes with five poems selected by Davies from The Soul's Destroyer.

In April 2013 Parthian Books published a new edition of the novel featuring Bernard Shaw's original introduction; it is part of the Library of Wales series, a collection of classic writing from Wales in the English language, a joint initiative of the Welsh Government and the Books Council of Wales.

== Background and synopsis ==
Following a delinquent childhood and youth, Davies renounced his home and his apprenticeship with a frame maker. At the age of twenty-two, having borrowed money from the executor of his grandmother’s estate, he sailed to America. This was the first of more than a dozen Atlantic crossings, often made by working his passage aboard a cattle boat. Between 1893 and 1899 Davies travelled the highways and railroads, tutored by hardened men of the road. He took advantage of the corrupt system of "boodle jails" in order to pass the winter in Michigan, staying in a series of different jails. These were jails in which a tramp could make an illicit arrangement with a law enforcement officer to stay in the jail without being an actual prisoner. Here, with his fellow tramps, Davies would enjoy the relative comfort of "card-playing, singing, smoking, reading, relating experiences and occasionally taking exercise or going out for a walk." Regular work was never an option and Davies subsisted largely by begging. After crossing the Atlantic from Britain to Canada at the time of the Klondike Gold Rush, Davies fell while hopping a train. His foot was crushed and his leg had to be amputated below the knee. He later wrote of the effect the accident had on his life: "All the wildness had been taken out of me and my adventures after this were not of my own seeking."

The book was praised by Osbert Sitwell for its "primitive splendour and directness", while Bernard Shaw himself commended the prose to "literary experts for its style alone", describing Davies as "the incorrigible Supertramp who wrote this amazing book."

== Adaptations ==
- In 1948 the BBC Home Service (now BBC Radio 4) recorded a condensed "potted" version of the book over fifteen consecutive Sundays, beginning on 4 April. It was narrated by Welsh poet Dylan Thomas.

== In popular culture ==
The English rock group Supertramp (whose founder and only constant member coincidently shared the same surname as the Welsh writer) was named after the book by original guitarist and lyricist Richard Palmer-James. Palmer later reflected that this was his only lasting contribution to the band, since he left after only 16 months and they carried on for four decades. In 1986, the group released a compilation titled The Autobiography of Supertramp, a direct reference to the book.

Chris McCandless renamed himself "Alexander Supertramp" when he began his journey in the US. After his death, his life inspired the 1996 biography Into The Wild and the 2007 film of the same name.
