= Monreith House =

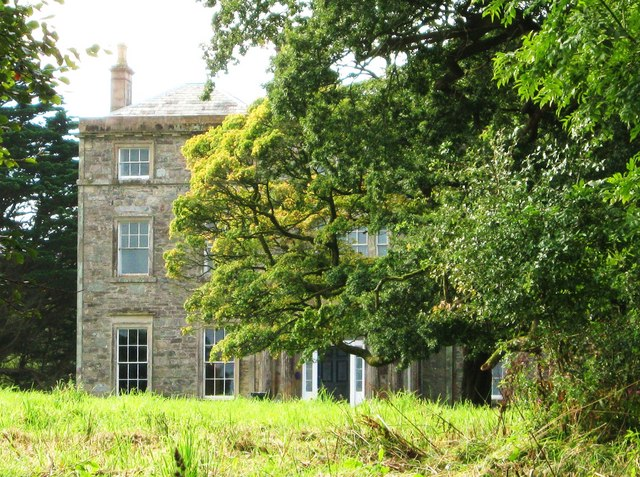
- Entrance front of Monreith House

- Location of Monreith House in Dumfries and Galloway
- 54.7538°N 4.5562°W
- Location: Port William, Dumfries and Galloway, Scotland, United Kingdom

History
- Built: 1791
- Built for: Sir William Maxwell, 4th Baronet

Site notes
- Architect: Alexander Stevens
- Architectural style: Georgian

Listed Building – Category A
- Designated: 20 July 1972
- Reference no.: LB19561

Inventory of Gardens and Designed Landscapes in Scotland
- Official name: Monreith
- Criteria: Work of Art; Historical; Horticultural; Architectural; Nature Conservation
- Designated: 1 July 1987
- Reference no.: GDL00287

Monreith House is a category A listed Georgian mansion located 1.5 kilometres (0.93 mi) east of the village of Port William in Mochrum parish in the historical county of Wigtownshire in Dumfries and Galloway, Scotland. The classical-style house was designed by Alexander Stevens in 1791, for Sir William Maxwell, 4th Baronet. The new house replaced the now-ruined Myrton Castle on the estate which was partially dismantled to provide stone for the house. The grounds of the house are included in the Inventory of Gardens and Designed Landscapes in Scotland, the national listing of significant gardens, and are classed as "outstanding" in five out of six categories.

== History ==
The Maxwell family first acquired Monreith in the 15th century, and built Myrton Castle on the estate. William Maxwell of Monreith was created a baronet of Nova Scotia in 1681. Magdalene Blair, wife of the third baronet, made tapestries of the gardens in the mid 17th century, which remain in the house. Sir William Maxwell, 4th Baronet, inherited the estate in 1771 and commissioned the present Monreith House from Alexander Stevens (1739–1796) in 1791. Sir William also laid out the grounds of the house as they largely remain today. In 1821, the porch was added to designs by Sir Robert Smirke.

Sir Herbert Maxwell (1845–1937) succeeded as 7th Baronet in 1877. He sat as Member of Parliament for Wigtownshire from 1880 to 1906, and was admitted to the Privy Council in 1897. He also served as Lord Lieutenant of Wigtown until 1935. In 1911, he published a book on Scottish gardens, and developed a substantial plant collection at Monreith. Following his death and the Second World War, the house was rented and the gardens declined. His grandson was Gavin Maxwell author of Ring of Bright Water, who was born at The House of Elrig on the estate. Gavin's older brother, Sir Aymer Maxwell, the 8th Baronet, owned the house and estate at this point, although was forced to sell the Maxwells' farming interests to a consortium of local businessmen in the 1950s, only retaining ownership of the house and its grounds.

Sir Aymer's nephew, the 9th Baronet Sir Michael (1943-2021); inherited the estate in 1987 following his uncle's death and carried out restoration work to the house, including the creation of holiday accommodation. In March 2011, Monreith House was the subject of a Channel 4 television documentary presented by hotelier Ruth Watson as part of her Country House Rescue series.

== Monreith Cross ==
The Monreith Cross is a 10th-century free-standing carved stone cross. The cross stands 2.3 metres (7 ft 7 in) high, and the circular head is 0.45 metres (1 ft 6 in) across. The cross originally stood on a hill known as the Mowr or Moure, but was moved several times. In 1974 it was removed from the Monreith estate for conservation, and is now on display in the Whithorn Museum.

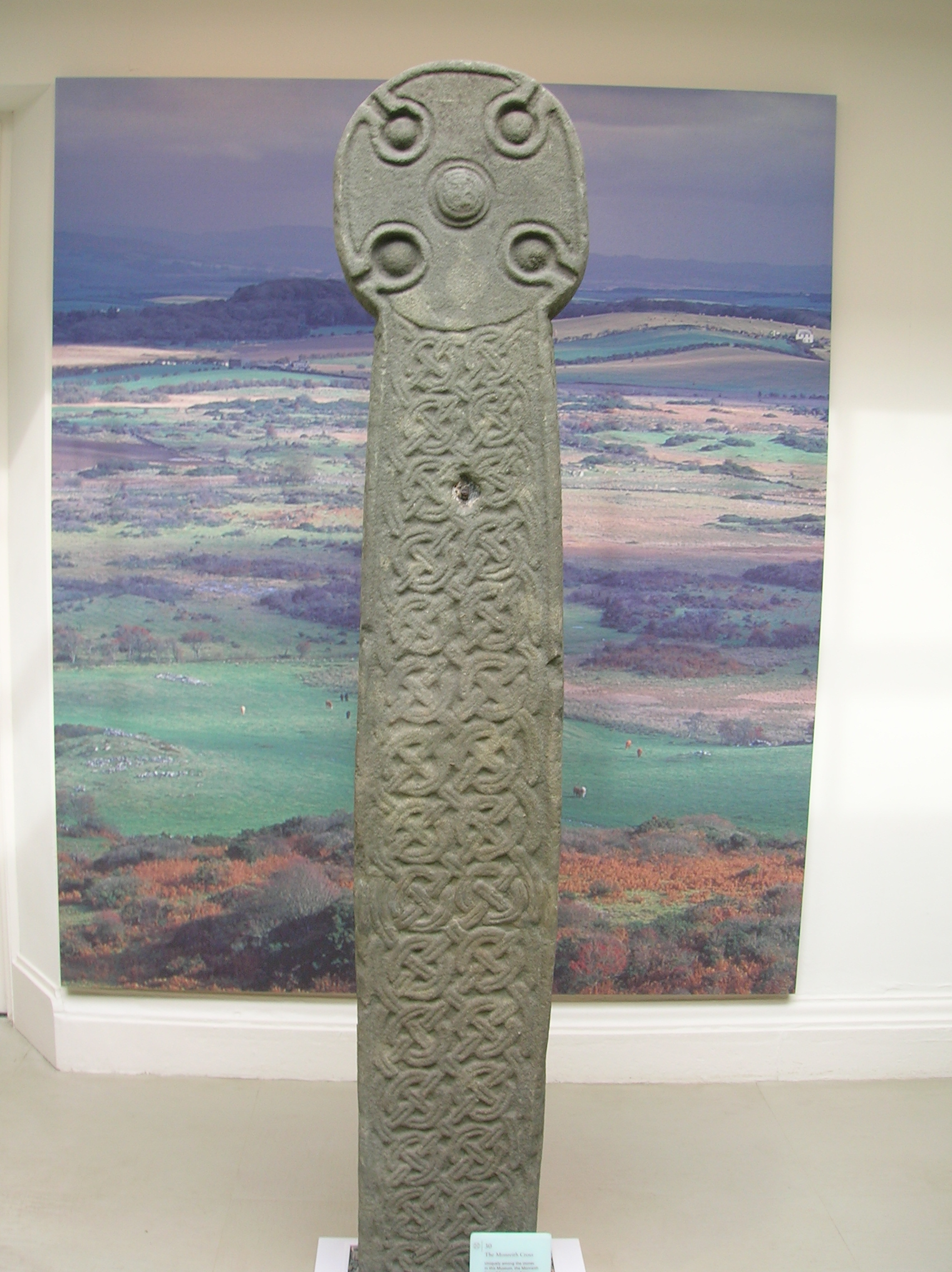
The Monreith Cross in Whithorn Museum
