= Leisure (poem) =

1911 poem by W. H. Davies

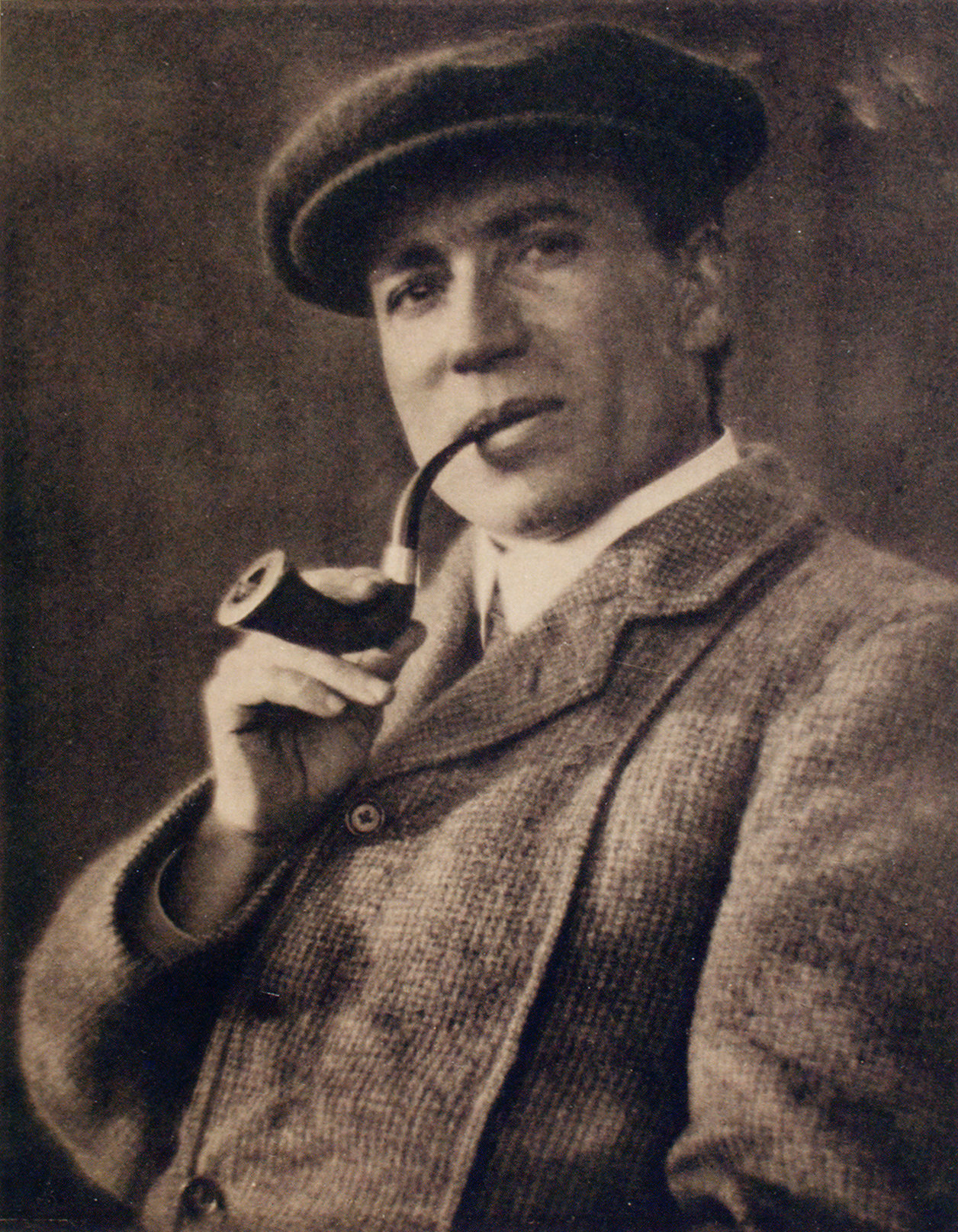
W. H. Davies, London, November 24th, 1913

"Leisure" is a poem by Welsh poet W. H. Davies, appearing originally in his Songs of Joy and Others, published in 1911 by A. C. Fifield and then in Davies' first anthology Collected Poems by the same publisher in 1916.

== Structure ==
The poem is written as a set of seven rhyming couplets.

What is this life if, full of care,

We have no time to stand and stare.

No time to stand beneath the boughs
And stare as long as sheep or cows.

No time to see, when woods we pass,
Where squirrels hide their nuts in grass.

No time to see, in broad daylight,
Streams full of stars, like skies at night.

No time to turn at Beauty's glance,
And watch her feet, how they can dance.

No time to wait till her mouth can
Enrich that smile her eyes began.

A poor life this if, full of care,
We have no time to stand and stare.

== Background ==
Although it was to become Davies' best-known poem, it was not included in any of the five Georgian Poetry anthologies published by Edward Marsh between 1912 and 1922. Thirty-two of Davies' other poems were.

It warns that "the hectic pace of modern life has a detrimental effect on the human spirit." Modern man has no time to spend free time in the lap of nature.

== Appraisal ==
In his 1963 Critical Biography of Davies, Richard J. Stonesifer traces the origins of the poem back to the sonnet "The World Is Too Much With Us" by William Wordsworth, saying:

"But he went to school with Wordsworth's sonnet "The world is too much with us", and echoes from that sonnet resound throughout his work as from few other poems. Philosophically, no other single poem can be said to form the basis of so much of his poetry. The celebrated opening of his wise little poem "Leisure" has its origins here."

Stonesifer traces the central idea to a number of Davies' other poems - "The Housebuilder" (from the 1914 The Bird of Paradise), "A Happy Life" and "Traffic", as well as "Bells" and "This World".

== Significance and legacy ==
Davies is generally best known for the opening two lines of this poem. It has appeared in most of the anthologies of his work and in many general poem anthologies, including:

- Christopher Ricks, ed. (2008). New Oxford Book of Victorian Verse. Oxford University Press. ISBN 978-0199556311.
- Book of a Thousand Poems (1983), Peter Bedrick Books
- Anglo-Welsh Poetry (1984), Poetry Wales Press
- Common Ground (1989), Carcanet
- A Poem a Day (1996), Steerforth Press

The poem features, in spoken form, on the album Anthology of 20th Century English Poetry (Part I), originally issued in 1960 on the Folkways Records label and has been used in British television advertisements, including those for Center Parcs and Orange Mobile.

The poem was misquoted, by the KGB in a 1991 secret message to their spy inside the FBI, Robert Hanssen.

Dear Friend:
Time is flying. As a poet said:

"What's our life,
If full of care
You have no time
To stop and stare?"

You've managed to slow down the speed of Your running life to send us a message. And we appreciate it.

The opening two lines of the poem, sung in English, are also used in the refrain of the song Monakh (Monk), by Ukrainian band DakhaBrakha, from their 2016 album The Road.
