= Doon of May =

Plantation in Dumfries and Galloway, Scotland

Coordinates: 54.829260°N 4.655741°W

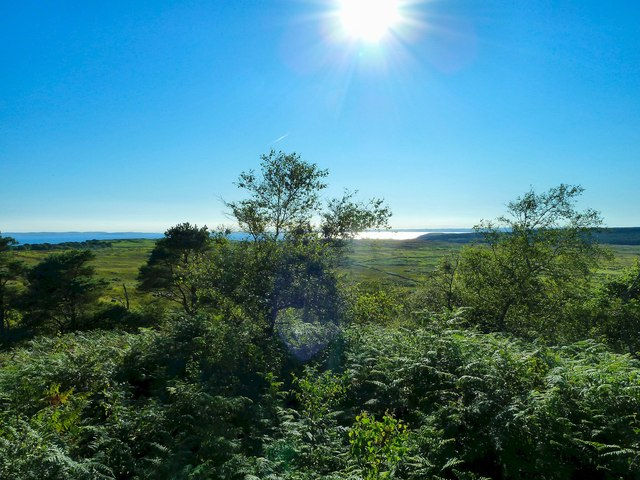
Doon of May Iron Age Hill Fort

The Doon of May is a conifer plantation associated with an Iron Age hill fort in Dumfries and Galloway, south-west Scotland. Located around 14 kilometres (8.7 mi) west of Wigtown on the Machars peninsula, it is in the parish of Mochrum in the traditional county of Wigtownshire. The plantation was purchased from the Forestry Commission by the Tinne Beag Workers’ Co-operative in 1999 and since then the co-operative has been managing the woodland for sustainable use of both timber and non-timber forest products, while increasing biodiversity and restoring native vegetation types where possible.

== Woodland ==
The woodland comprises 100 acres (40 ha) of sitka spruce plantation with a substantial area of semi-natural deciduous woodland of oak, ash, beech, birch, Scots pine, willow, alder, and sycamore. There is also 75 acres (30 ha) of peat bog wetland that was clear-felled around 1998. It is being regenerated with birch, rowan, willow and oak. Within the sitka there are many wetland glades of derelict alder coppice and areas containing a variety of sphagnums.

== Hill fort ==
The Doon of May plantation takes its name from a vitrified Iron Age hill fort on the south-west of the plantation. The fort is some 139 metres (456 ft) above sea level and provides views of Luce Bay with the coast of Ireland in the distance. The fort, also described as a walled settlement, is roughly elliptical, measuring 140 feet (43 m) east to west by 100 feet (30 m) north to south. The surrounding wall is up to 10 feet (3.0 m) on the south side, and the entrance was probably from the west. The facing stones of the heavily vitrified wall have almost entirely gone. Natural cliffs enhance the defensive nature of the site, and no evidence survives of outer defences. The Doon of May is a scheduled monument.

== Boundaries ==
The northern boundary of the woodland is formed by the south edge of Mochrum Loch, a Site of Special Scientific Interest, hosting Britain's largest inland nesting colony of cormorants. The woodland is adjacent to part of the Sustrans National Cycle Network. A Peace Pole has been erected at the eastern side of the public road which passes through the plantation.
