= List of listed buildings in Mochrum, Dumfries and Galloway =

This is a list of listed buildings in the civil parish of Mochrum, in Dumfries and Galloway, Scotland.

== List ==
Name	Location	Date Listed	Grid Ref. (Note: Sometimes known as OSGB36, the grid reference (where provided) is based on the British national grid reference system used by the Ordnance Survey. • "Guide to National Grid". Ordnance Survey. • "Get-a-map". Ordnance Survey.)	Geo-coordinates	Notes	LB Number (Note: Historic Environment Scotland assign a unique alphanumeric identifier to each designated site in Scotland, for listed buildings this always begins with "LB", for example "LB12345".)	Image
Mochrum, 23 Main Street				54°47′09″N 4°34′18″W	Category C(S)	19552	Upload Photo
Mochrum, 35 Main Street				54°47′10″N 4°34′15″W	Category C(S)	19557	Upload Photo
Monreith, West Gateway				54°45′15″N 4°33′57″W	Category C(S)	19566	Upload Photo
Port William, Church Street, (Former) Port William Church, With Boundary Walls				54°45′46″N 4°35′00″W	Category C(S)	19572	Upload Photo
Port William, High Street, Bank Of Scotland, With Boundary Walls, Railings And Gatepiers				54°45′32″N 4°34′56″W	Category B	19578	Upload Photo
Port William, High Street, Port William School And Schoolhouse				54°45′30″N 4°34′43″W	Category C(S)	19580	Upload Photo
Port William, 81 Main Street				54°45′42″N 4°35′03″W	Category C(S)	19584	Upload Photo
Port William, 5, 7 And 9 The Square				54°45′35″N 4°35′01″W	Category C(S)	19592	Upload Photo
Elrig, 16 Main Street, Weavers Cottage				54°47′48″N 4°36′45″W	Category C(S)	16822	Upload Photo
Mochrum, 1 Main Street				54°47′06″N 4°34′22″W	Category C(S)	19541	Upload Photo
Mochrum, 15 Main Street				54°47′08″N 4°34′20″W	Category C(S)	19548	Upload Photo
Old Place Of Mochrum, Cartshed				54°51′06″N 4°38′12″W	Category B	19568	Upload Photo
Old Place Of Mochrum With Walled Garden, Wellhead And Sundial				54°51′09″N 4°38′13″W	Category A	19570	Upload Photo
Port William, 4 Main Street, Eagle Hotel				54°45′42″N 4°35′04″W	Category C(S)	19585	Upload Photo
White Dyke Bridge				54°50′14″N 4°34′51″W	Category C(S)	19593	Upload Photo
Elrig, 24 Main Street				54°47′50″N 4°36′45″W	Category C(S)	16825	Upload Photo
Elrig, Old Mill House, With Garden Walls, Gates And Railings				54°47′32″N 4°36′41″W	Category B	16828	Upload Photo
Loch Alt Cottage, Loch Head, With Boundary Walls				54°48′40″N 4°36′14″W	Category C(S)	16830	Upload Photo
Elrig, 7 Main Street				54°47′44″N 4°36′43″W	Category C(S)	16843	Upload Photo
Elrig, 11 Main Street				54°47′45″N 4°36′43″W	Category C(S)	16844	Upload Photo
Mochrum, 3 Main Street				54°47′06″N 4°34′21″W	Category C(S)	19542	Upload Photo
Mochrum, 13 Main Street				54°47′07″N 4°34′20″W	Category C(S)	19547	Upload Photo
Monreith, Ice House				54°45′12″N 4°33′36″W	Category B	19562	Upload Photo
Monreith, Myrton Chapel				54°45′30″N 4°32′55″W	Category C(S)	19565	Upload Photo
Port William, Bridge				54°45′34″N 4°34′58″W	Category C(S)	19571	Upload Photo
Port William, High Street, Seymour House, With Boundary Walls And Railings				54°45′33″N 4°34′47″W	Category B	19581	Upload Photo
Port William, High Street, Struan				54°45′32″N 4°34′51″W	Category C(S)	19582	Upload Photo
Port William, Port William Mill				54°45′35″N 4°34′57″W	Category B	19590	Upload Photo
Port William, 11 And 13 The Square				54°45′34″N 4°35′03″W	Category C(S)	19591	Upload Photo
Elrig, 12 And 14 Main Street, Rose Cottage				54°47′46″N 4°36′45″W	Category C(S)	16821	Upload Photo
Elrig, 18 Main Street, Otter Inn				54°47′48″N 4°36′45″W	Category C(S)	16823	Upload Photo
Elrig, 20 Main Street				54°47′48″N 4°36′45″W	Category C(S)	16824	Upload Photo
Elrig, 2 Main Street, The Old School With Boundary Wall				54°47′42″N 4°36′43″W	Category C(S)	16827	Upload Photo
Barrachan, Holly Cottage				54°48′48″N 4°33′04″W	Category C(S)	16834	Upload Photo
Corsemalzie, House Hotel				54°50′22″N 4°34′29″W	Category C(S)	16838	Upload Photo
Mochrum, 21 Main Street				54°47′09″N 4°34′16″W	Category C(S)	19551	Upload Photo
Mochrum, 29 Main Street, Benmor				54°47′10″N 4°34′16″W	Category C(S)	19555	Upload Photo
Monreith House, With Office Court, Gatepiers And Terrace Wall				54°45′13″N 4°33′23″W	Category A	19561	Upload Photo
Port William, High Street, Ivy Cottage, With Boundary Wall And Railings				54°45′32″N 4°34′48″W	Category C(S)	19579	Upload Photo
Port William, 12 Main Street, Bayfield				54°45′40″N 4°35′02″W	Category C(S)	19587	Upload Photo
Port William, Port William Harbour, Pier, Gateway And Gateway Boundary Walls				54°45′36″N 4°35′01″W	Category C(S)	19589	Upload Photo
House Of Elrig, With Terrace Garden, Boundary Walls And Gatepiers				54°48′45″N 4°37′46″W	Category B	16829	Upload Photo
Castle Island				54°51′09″N 4°39′38″W	Category C(S)	16835	Upload Photo
Culshabbin, Cottage				54°49′29″N 4°38′27″W	Category C(S)	16840	Upload Photo
Drumfad Bridge				54°45′32″N 4°32′02″W	Category C(S)	16842	Upload Photo
Mochrum, 5 Main Street				54°47′06″N 4°34′21″W	Category C(S)	19543	Upload Photo
Mochrum, 11 Main Street				54°47′07″N 4°34′20″W	Category C(S)	19546	Upload Photo
Mochrum, 2 Main Street				54°47′07″N 4°34′18″W	Category B	19558	Upload Photo
Mochrum, The Old School				54°47′08″N 4°34′28″W	Category C(S)	19560	Upload Photo
Monreith, Myrton Castle				54°45′27″N 4°33′00″W	Category B	19564	Upload Photo
Port William, 3 Commercial Street				54°45′33″N 4°35′00″W	Category C(S)	19574	Upload Photo
Port William, 10 Main Street				54°45′40″N 4°35′03″W	Category C(S)	19586	Upload Photo
Port William, Maxwell Park, War Memorial				54°45′36″N 4°34′59″W	Category C(S)	19588	Upload Photo
Elrig, 26 Main Street, The Anchorage With Garden Wall				54°47′50″N 4°36′46″W	Category C(S)	16826	Upload Photo
Corsemalzie, Bridge				54°50′19″N 4°34′27″W	Category C(S)	16837	Upload Photo
Culshabbin School House				54°49′31″N 4°38′17″W	Category C(S)	16841	Upload Photo
Mochrum, 7 Main Street				54°47′07″N 4°34′21″W	Category C(S)	19544	Upload Photo
Mochrum, 9 Main Street				54°47′07″N 4°34′21″W	Category C(S)	19545	Upload Photo
Mochrum, 17 Main Street				54°47′08″N 4°34′19″W	Category C(S)	19549	Upload Photo
Mochrum, 19 Main Street, Taigh Breac				54°47′08″N 4°34′19″W	Category C(S)	19550	Upload Photo
Mochrum, 25 Main Street				54°47′09″N 4°34′18″W	Category C(S)	19553	Upload Photo
Mochrum, 4 Main Street, Norton Cottage				54°47′09″N 4°34′17″W	Category B	19559	Upload Photo
Monreith, Myrton Cottage (Monreith Estate Office)				54°45′28″N 4°33′00″W	Category C(S)	19563	Upload Photo
Old Place Of Mochrum, Bridge And Sluice Gate				54°51′07″N 4°38′17″W	Category B	19567	Upload Photo
Port William, Church Street, Port William Library				54°45′47″N 4°35′04″W	Category C(S)	19573	Upload Photo
Port William, 2 Commercial Street, Commercial Hotel				54°45′33″N 4°34′58″W	Category C(S)	19575	Upload Photo
Elrig, 13 Main Street, Birch Cottage				54°47′46″N 4°36′43″W	Category C(S)	16820	Upload Photo
Airylick, Farmhouse And Cartshed				54°48′39″N 4°37′33″W	Category B	16831	Upload Photo
Craigheach				54°52′17″N 4°37′58″W	Category B	16839	Upload Photo
Mochrum, Greenmantle Hotel (Former Manse), With Boundary Walls				54°47′05″N 4°34′18″W	Category B	19539	Upload Photo
Mochrum, 27 Main Street				54°47′10″N 4°34′16″W	Category C(S)	19554	Upload Photo
Mochrum, 31 Main Street				54°47′10″N 4°34′16″W	Category C(S)	19556	Upload Photo
Old Place Of Mochrum, Electricity House And Sawmill				54°51′04″N 4°38′16″W	Category B	19569	Upload Photo
Port William, 7 High Street				54°45′33″N 4°34′52″W	Category C(S)	19577	Upload Photo
Barrachan, Ashgrove				54°48′52″N 4°33′01″W	Category C(S)	16832	Upload Photo
Lochead, Signpost				54°48′39″N 4°36′13″W	Category B	50023	Upload Photo
Mochrum, Kirk Of Mochrum, With Graveyard, Graveyard Walls And Gatepiers				54°47′06″N 4°34′18″W	Category B	19540	Upload Photo
Port William, 6 Commercial Street				54°45′32″N 4°35′00″W	Category C(S)	19576	Upload Photo
Port William, 75 Main Street				54°45′43″N 4°35′03″W	Category C(S)	19583	Upload Photo
Barrachan, Cottage, With Post-Box				54°48′50″N 4°33′02″W	Category C(S)	16833	Upload Photo
Clachan Of Myrton, Myrton Smithy				54°45′48″N 4°32′14″W	Category C(S)	16836	Upload Photo

== Key ==
The scheme for classifying buildings in Scotland is:

- Category A: "buildings of national or international importance, either architectural or historic; or fine, little-altered examples of some particular period, style or building type."
- Category B: "buildings of regional or more than local importance; or major examples of some particular period, style or building type, which may have been altered."
- Category C: "buildings of local importance; lesser examples of any period, style, or building type, as originally constructed or moderately altered; and simple traditional buildings which group well with other listed buildings."

In March 2016 there were 47,288 listed buildings in Scotland. Of these, 8% were Category A, and 50% were Category B, with the remaining 42% being Category C.
