= Richard J. Stonesifer =

American educator

- Presidential Portrait of Richard J. Stonesifer

Fifth President of Monmouth University
- In office 1971–1979

Personal details
- Born: June 21, 1922 Lancaster, Pennsylvania, United States
- Died: January 1999 (aged 76) Mullins, South Carolina, United States
- Parents: Rev. Paul T. Stonesifer (father); Esther (Wittlinger) Stonesifer (mother)
- Education: Franklin & Marshall College; Northwestern University; University of Pennsylvania

Richard James Stonesifer (June 21, 1922 – January 1999) was the fifth President of Monmouth University.

== Early life and career ==
Stonesifer was born in Lancaster, Pennsylvania, to Rev. Paul T. and Esther (Wittlinger) Stonesifer.

He graduated from Franklin and Marshall College in 1944 where he was a member of Sigma Pi fraternity. He then served in the Army Air Force during World War II. After the war he earned his Master of Arts from Northwestern University and married Nancy Jane Weaver on June 28, 1947. They had one daughter, Pamela Ann. He then returned to Franklin and Marshall as a member of the English Department from 1946 until 1960. During this time he earned his Doctorate Degree from the University of Pennsylvania in 1954.

== College leadership ==
In 1960, he was promoted to Assistant to the President of Franklin and Marshall. Through his efforts the college won an award from the American College of Public Relations Association for his newspaper series “Campus and Classroom” in 1962.

On March 1, 1963, he was named as the new Assistant To the Provost and Director Of the College of General Studies and the Summer School for the University of Pennsylvania. He also joined the faculty of the Annenberg School as an associate professor of communications. During his time at the university he wrote his book about Welsh tramp poet W. H. Davies, entitled W. H. Davies: A Critical Biography, the first full biography of Davies, which was published in 1965.

Stonesifer then moved to Drew University in 1965. He served as their dean of the College of Liberal Arts until 1971.

== College President ==
From 1971 to 1979 he served as the President of Monmouth University. Dr. Stonesifer has received some credit for developing the academic reputation of Monmouth. During this time several buildings on campus were added to the National Register of Historic Places and the college received some attention for being the home of the New York Knicks and New York Giants training camps.

His tenure was marred by a tight financial situation at the university. Like most private colleges in the 1970s, Monmouth suffered from declining enrollment, national economic inflation, and debt from a large building program in the 1960s. The faculty threatened strikes throughout the decade. There was eventually a two-week faculty strike in 1979 as well as a longer staff strike. These strikes strained his relationship with the college's regents which caused him to step down.

== Post presidential career ==
After leaving Monmouth he served as a Woodrow Wilson professor of humanities and social science from 1979 to 1982.

Stonesifer died in Mullins, South Carolina, in January 1999.

== Publications ==
=== Books ===
- Stonesifer, Richard J. (1963), W. H. Davies - A Critical Biography, London: Jonathan Cape, ISBN B0000CLPA3

=== Articles ===
- Stonesifer, Richard J. "The Catsup Factory Fallacy." Small College Annual, 1966: p. 11-12.
- Stonesifer, Richard J. "A Ritual of Restlessness." The Drew University Magazine, Summer 1970: p. 11-13.
- Stonesifer, Richard J. "TV Form and TV Sense." Television Quarterly, vol. 4, no. 2, Spring 1965: p. 19-27.
