= Boodle =

Slang term for money

Boodle is a slang term for money derived from the Dutch word 'boedel' meaning property or estate. Afrikaans inherited the word and its meaning from the Dutch, which probably accounts for its widespread use for money amongst English-speaking South Africans.

In the United States, particularly in the 19th century, "boodle jails" were jails where, on payment of a small fee to an officer, tramps or hobos could take up residence without being an actual prisoner. In the late-19th century, the Welsh tramp-poet W. H. Davies took advantage of such an arrangement to spend the winter in a number of boodle jails in Michigan. Here Davies could enjoy the comforts of "card-playing, singing, smoking, reading, relating experiences and occasionally taking exercise or going out for a walk."
