= Elrig =

Coordinates: 54°47′46″N 4°36′44″W

Elrig: Scottish Gaelic: An Eileirg
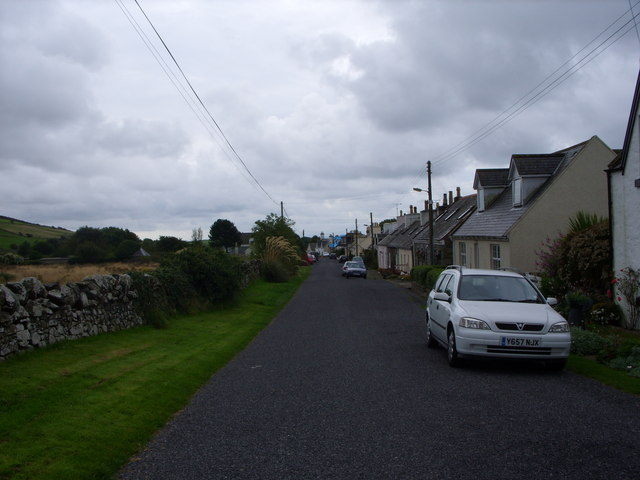
- Elrig Village

- Location within Dumfries and Galloway
- OS grid reference: NX321477
- Council area: Dumfries and Galloway
- Lieutenancy area: Wigtownshire
- Country: Scotland
- Sovereign state: United Kingdom
- Post town: NEWTON STEWART
- Postcode district: DG8
- Police: Scotland
- Fire: Scottish
- Ambulance: Scottish
- UK Parliament: Dumfries and Galloway
- Scottish Parliament: Galloway and West Dumfries

Elrig (Scottish Gaelic: An Eileirg, meaning "the deer run") is a clachan or hamlet in the historical county of Wigtownshire in Dumfries and Galloway, Scotland. Located in the Machars peninsula, it is about 3 miles (5 km) north of Port William.

Elrig is the birthplace of author and naturalist Gavin Maxwell, who was born at the House of Elrig. The house was built in 1912 for his parents Aymer and Lady Mary Maxwell by the architects John Stewart & George Paterson. His boyhood is recounted in The House of Elrig, published in 1965. The house and grounds of his family estate are private with no public access.

Between 1941 and 1946 Oscar Kokoschka and his wife Olda spent several weeks each summer with the new owner of House of Elrig, fellow refugee, Czech Professor Emil Korner.

== Etymology ==
The town's name derives from the original Gaelic placename, An Eilreig. The Gaelic language arrived in Galloway in the 7th century and the language was still strong in Wigtownshire in the 18th century.

== Ancient monuments ==
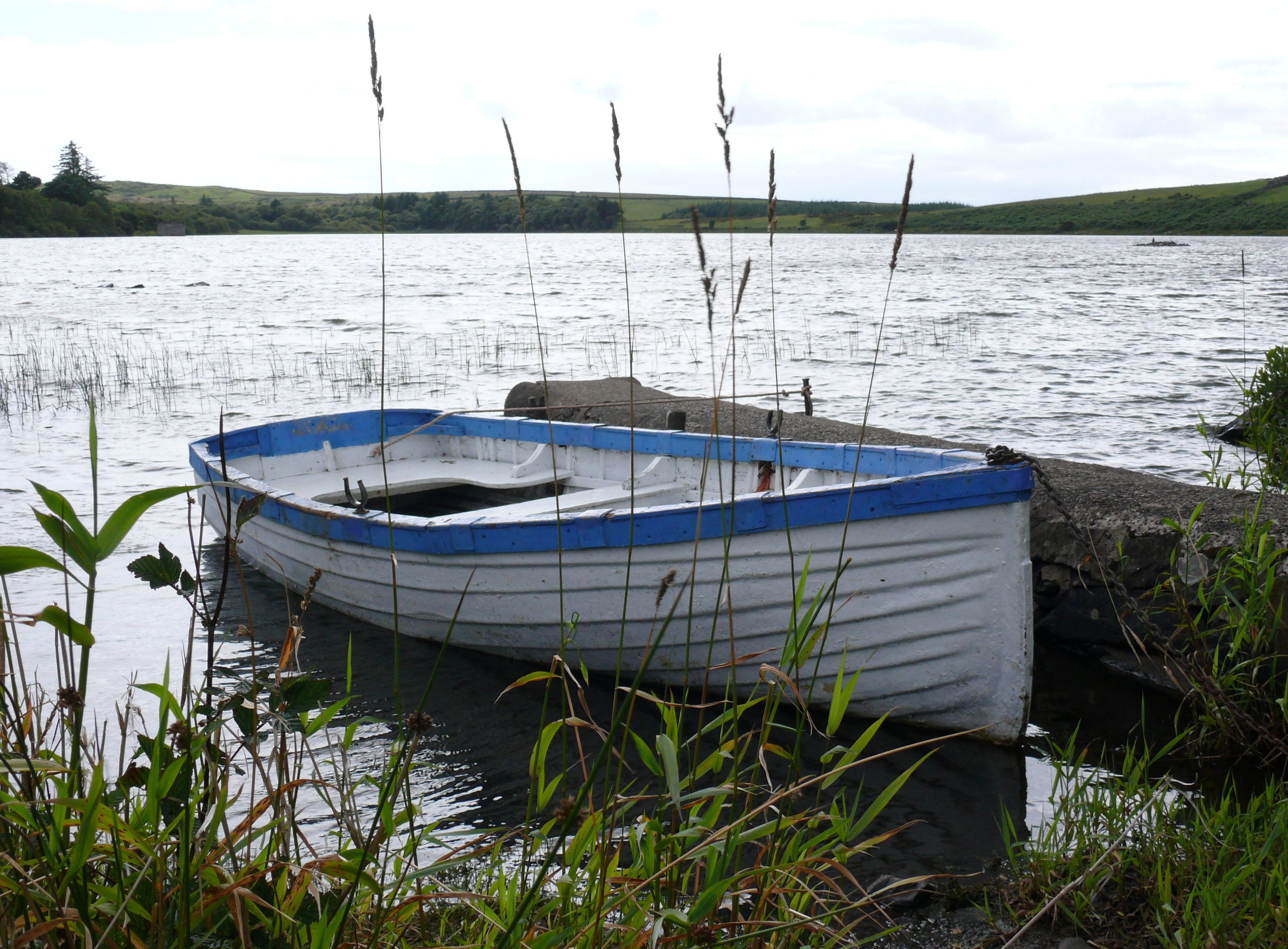
Elrig Loch crannog on the right

A standing stone, the Carlin Stone, can be found on The Derry, near to the head of Elrig Loch, which is also home to the remains of a crannog. The ruins of a mediaeval chapel can be found at Barhobble, which is near to the House of Elrig. None of the above is within Elrig itself, but all are located relatively near to the settlement in Mochrum Parish.

== Politics ==
The council area of Port William, Dumfries and Galloway represents Barrachan, Port William, Mochrum and Monreith as well as Elrig. 885 people live in the area. There are 18 councillors who run the region and the council meets each month at the Talla MhicShuail in Port William. Elrig is in the 02 electoral district (Port William, Dumfries and Galloway) for the Comhairle na Roinne.

| Party | Name | Votes |
|---|---|---|
| Independent | Greum Forster | 1,330 |
| Scottish Conservative Party | Roberta Tuckfield | 859.3 |
| SNP | Seumas MacLuinge | 741 |

== Transportation ==
There is no rail service, but there is a bus service:

- 415 Newton Stewart - Machair.
