= W. H. Davies =

Welsh poet and writer (1871–1940)

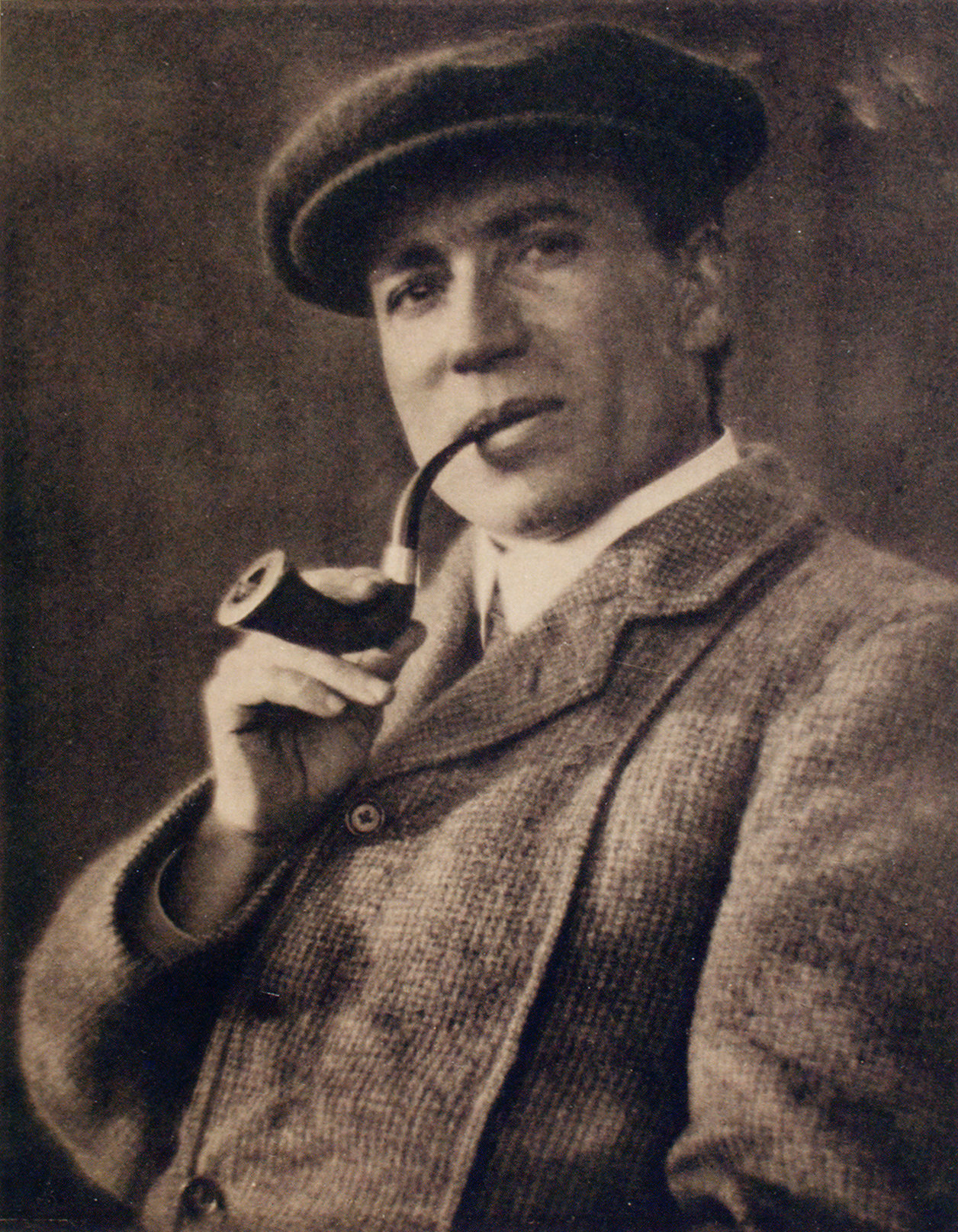
- Davies in 1913
- Born: William Henry Davies; 3 July 1871; Newport, Monmouthshire, Wales
- Died: 26 September 1940 (aged 69); Nailsworth, Gloucestershire, England
- Occupations: Poet, writer, tramp
- Spouse: Helen Matilda Payne (m. 1923)
- Writing career
- Period: 1905–1940
- Genres: Lyrical poetry, autobiography
- Subjects: Nature, begging, the life of a tramp
- Notable works: The Autobiography of a Super-Tramp "Leisure"
- Movement: Georgian poetry

William Henry Davies (3 July 1871 (Note: Several sources give the birth as 20 April, which Davies himself believed, but his birth certificate gives 3 July) – 26 September 1940) was a Welsh poet and writer, who spent much of his life as a tramp or hobo in the United Kingdom and the United States, yet became one of the most popular poets of his time. His themes included observations on life's hardships, the ways the human condition is reflected in nature, his tramping adventures and the characters he met. His work has been classed as Georgian, though it is not typical of that class of work in theme or style.

== Life and career ==
=== Early life ===
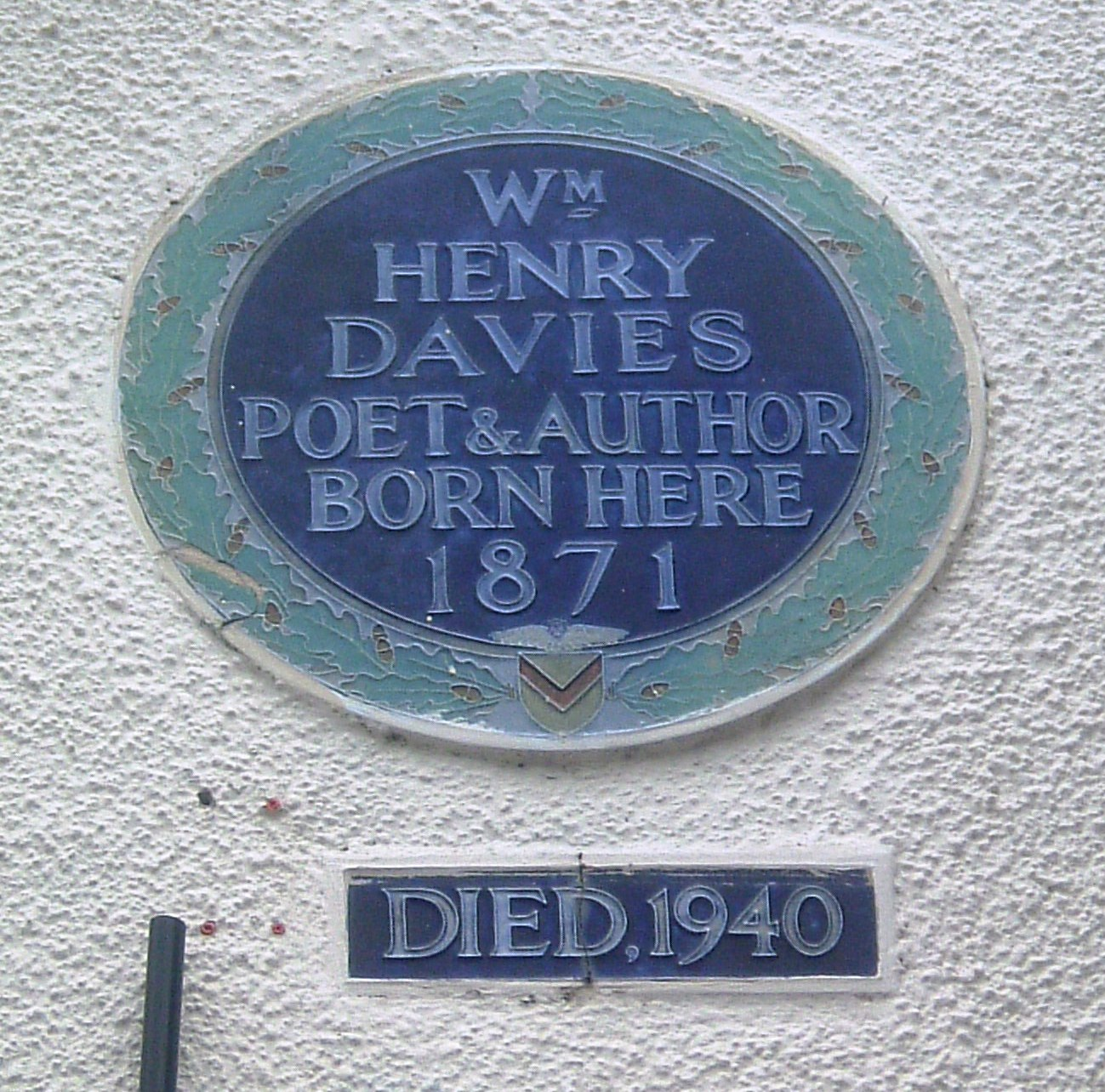
Plaque commemorating Davies' supposed place of birth, at "The Church House Inn", in Pillgwenlly, Newport, Wales.

The son of an iron moulder, Davies was born at 6 Portland Street in the Pillgwenlly district of Newport, Monmouthshire, a busy port. He had an older brother, Francis Gomer Boase, born with part of his skull displaced, who Davies' biographer describes as "simple and peculiar". In 1874 a sister, Matilda, was born.

In November 1874, William was aged three when his father died. The next year his mother, Mary Anne Davies, remarried as Mrs Joseph Hill. She agreed that care of the three children should pass to their paternal grandparents, Francis and Lydia Davies, who ran the nearby Church House Inn at 14 Portland Street. His grandfather Francis Boase Davies, originally from Cornwall, had been a sea captain. Davies was related to the British actor Sir Henry Irving, known as Cousin Brodribb to the family. He later recalled his grandmother speaking of Irving as "the cousin who brought disgrace on us." According to a neighbour's memories, she wore "pretty little caps, with bebe ribbon, tiny roses and puce trimmings." Osbert Sitwell, introducing the 1943 Collected Poems of W. H. Davies, recalled Davies telling him that along with his grandparents and himself, his home held "an imbecile brother, a sister... a maidservant, a dog, a cat, a parrot, a dove and a canary bird." Sitwell also recounts how Davies's grandmother, a Baptist, was "of a more austere and religious turn of mind than her husband."

In 1879 the family moved to Raglan Street, Newport, then to Upper Lewis Street, where William attended Temple School. In 1883 he moved to Alexandra Road School and the following year was arrested, as one of five schoolmates charged with stealing handbags. He was given twelve strokes of the birch. In 1885 Davies wrote his first poem entitled "Death."

In Poet's Pilgrimage (1918) Davies recalls that, at the age of 14, he was left with orders to sit with his dying grandfather. He missed the final moments of his grandfather's life as he was too engrossed in reading "a very interesting book of wild adventure."

=== Delinquent to "supertramp" ===
After school, Davies worked as an ironmonger. In November 1886 his grandmother signed Davies up for a five-year apprenticeship to a local picture-frame maker. Davies never enjoyed the craft. He left Newport, took casual work and began his travels. The Autobiography of a Super-Tramp (1908) covers his American life in 1893–1899, including adventures and characters from his travels as a drifter. During the period, he crossed the Atlantic Ocean at least seven times on cattle ships. He travelled through many states doing seasonal work.

Davies took advantage of the corrupt system of "boodle" to pass the winter in Michigan by agreeing to be locked in a series of jails. Here with his fellow tramps Davies enjoyed relative comfort in "card-playing, singing, smoking, reading, relating experiences, and occasionally taking exercise or going out for a walk." At one point on his way to Memphis, Tennessee, he lay alone in a swamp for three days and nights suffering from malaria.

The turning point in Davies's life came after a week of rambling in London. He spotted a newspaper story about the riches to be made in the Klondike and set off to make his fortune in Canada. Attempting with a fellow tramp, Three-fingered Jack, to jump a freight train at Renfrew, Ontario on 20 March 1899, he lost his footing and his right foot was crushed under the wheels of the train. The leg was amputated below the knee and he wore a pegleg thereafter. Davies' biographers agree the accident was crucial, although Davies played down the story. Moult begins his biography with the incident, and his biographer Richard J. Stonesifer suggested this event, more than any other, led Davies to become a professional poet. Davies writes, "I bore this accident with an outward fortitude that was far from the true state of my feelings. Thinking of my present helplessness caused me many a bitter moment, but I managed to impress all comers with a false indifference.... I was soon home again, away less than four months; but all the wildness was taken out of me, and my adventures after this were not of my seeking, but the result of circumstances." Davies took an ambivalent view of his disability. In his poem "The Fog", published in the 1913 Foliage, a blind man leads the poet through the fog, showing the reader how someone impaired in one domain may have a big advantage in another.

=== Poet ===
Leisure

What is this life if, full of care,
We have no time to stand and stare.

No time to stand beneath the boughs
And stare as long as sheep or cows.

No time to see, when woods we pass,
Where squirrels hide their nuts in grass.

No time to see, in broad day light,
Streams full of stars, like skies at night.

No time to turn at beauty's glance,
And watch her feet, how they can dance.

No time to wait till her mouth can
Enrich that smile her eyes began.

A poor life this if, full of care,
We have no time to stand and stare.

— from Songs of Joy and Others (1911)

Davies returned to Britain, to a rough life largely in London shelters and doss-houses, including a Salvation Army hostel in Southwark known as "The Ark", which he grew to despise. Fearing the reaction of his fellow tramps to his writings, Davies would pretend to sleep, while composing his poems in his head, for later transcription in private. At one point, he borrowed money to print some, which he attempted to sell door-to-door. The effort was not successful and Davies burned all of the printed sheets.

Davies self-published his first slim book of poetry, The Soul's Destroyer, in 1905, again by means of his savings. It proved to be the beginning of success and a growing reputation. To publish it, Davies forwent his allowance to live as a tramp for six months (with the first draft of the book hidden in his pocket), just to secure a loan of funds from his inheritance. After it was published, the volume was ignored. He resorted to posting individual copies by hand to prospective wealthy customers chosen from the pages of Who's Who, asking them to send the price of the book, a half crown, in return. He sold 60 of the 200 copies printed. One of the copies went to Arthur St John Adcock, then a journalist with the Daily Mail. On reading the book, he later wrote in his essay "Gods of Modern Grub Street", Adcock said he "recognised there were crudities and doggerel in it, there was also in it some of the freshest and most magical poetry to be found in modern books." He sent the price of the book, then asked Davies to meet him. Adcock is seen as "the man who discovered Davies." The first trade edition of The Soul's Destroyer was published by Alston Rivers in 1907. A second edition followed in 1908 and a third in 1910. A 1906 edition, by Fifield, was advertised but has not been verified.

=== Rural life in Kent ===
On 12 October 1905 Davies met Edward Thomas, then literary critic for the Daily Chronicle in London, who did more to help him than anyone else. Thomas rented for Davies the tiny two-roomed Stidulph's Cottage in Egg Pie Lane, not far from his own home at Elses Farm near Sevenoaks in Kent. Davies moved to the cottage from 6 Llanwern Street, Newport, via London, in the second week of February 1907. The cottage was "only two meadows off" from Thomas's house.

In 1907, the manuscript of The Autobiography of a Super-Tramp drew the attention of George Bernard Shaw, who agreed to write a preface (largely through the efforts of his wife Charlotte). It was only through Shaw that Davies' contract with the publishers was rewritten to retain him the serial rights, all rights after three years, royalties of 15 per cent of selling price, and a non-returnable advance of £25. Davies was also to be given a say in the style of illustrations, advertisement layouts and cover designs. The original publisher, Duckworth and Sons, rejected the new terms and the book passed to the London publisher Fifield.

Several anecdotes of Davies's time with the Thomas family appear in a brief account later published by Thomas's widow Helen. In 1911, he was awarded a Civil List pension of £50, later increased to £100 and then to £150.

Davies began to spend more time in London and make literary friends and acquaintances. Despite an aversion to giving his own autograph, he began a collection of his own. The Georgian Poetry editor Edward Marsh helped him to obtain that of D. H. Lawrence, which Davies was particularly keen to have, and subsequently arranged a meeting between Davies, Lawrence and Lawrence's wife-to-be Frieda. Lawrence was initially impressed but his view changed after reading Foliage and he later described Davies' Nature Poems as "so thin, one can hardly feel them."

By this time Davies had a library of some fifty books at his cottage, mostly 16th and 17th-century poets, among them Shakespeare, Milton, Wordsworth, Byron, Burns, Shelley, Keats, Coleridge, Blake and Herrick. In December 1908 his essay "How It Feels To Be Out of Work", described by Stonesifer as "a rather pedestrian performance", appeared in The English Review. He continued to send other periodical articles to editors, but without success.

=== Social life in London ===
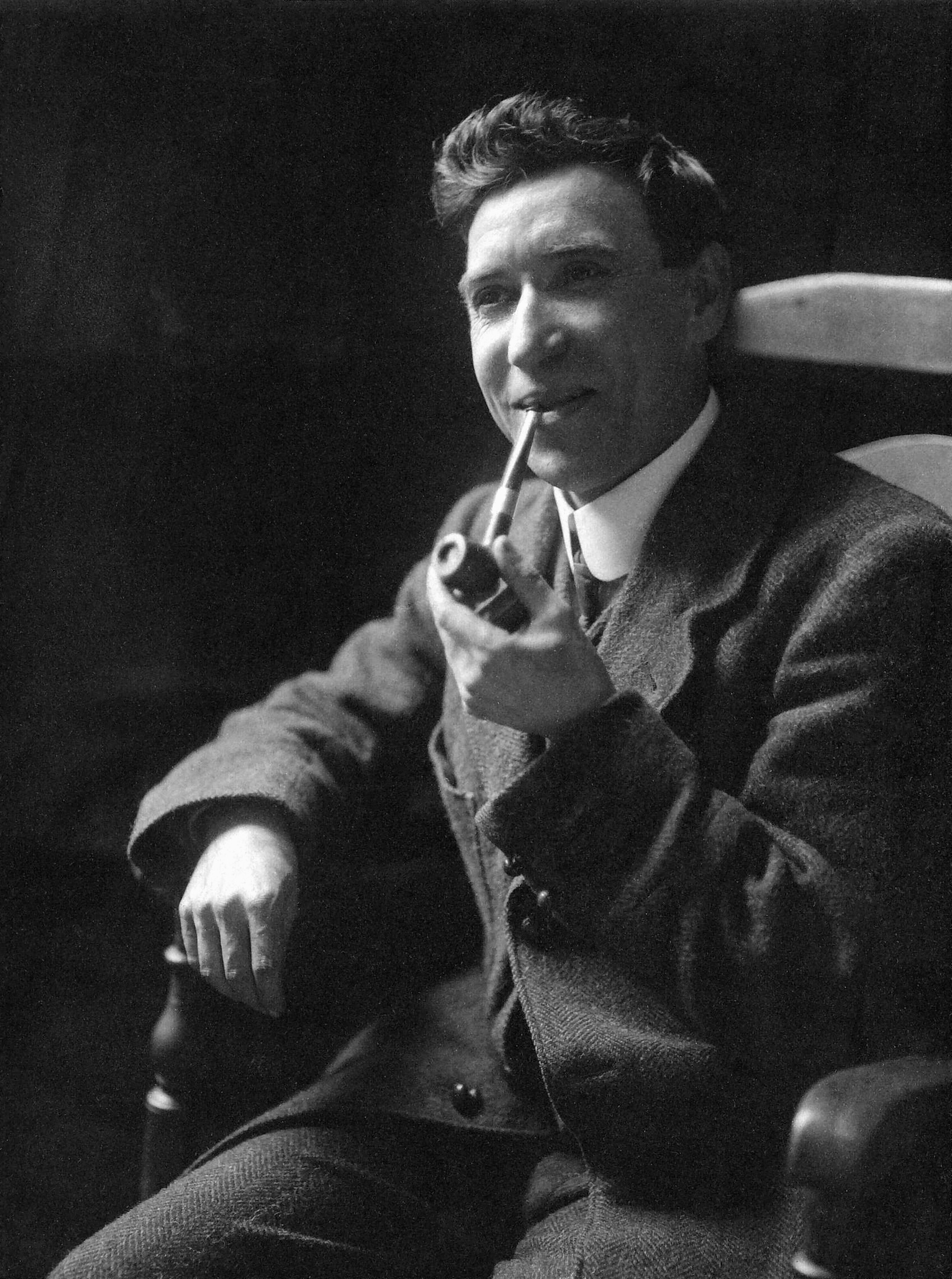
Davies in 1915

After lodging at several addresses in Sevenoaks, Davies moved back to London early in 1914, settling eventually at 14 Great Russell Street in the Bloomsbury district. (Note: The address was used by Charles Dickens as the residence of one of his characters in his early story "The Bloomsbury Christening", later collected in Sketches by Boz.) He lived there from early 1916 until 1921 in a small apartment, initially accompanied by an infestation of rodents, and adjacent to rooms occupied by a loud, Belgian prostitute.[p. 118] During this London period, Davies embarked on a series of public readings of his work, alongside others such as Hilaire Belloc and W. B. Yeats, impressing fellow poet Ezra Pound. He soon found he could socialise with leading society figures of the day, including Arthur Balfour and Lady Randolph Churchill. While in London he also took up with artists such as Jacob Epstein, Harold and Laura Knight, Nina Hamnett, Augustus John, Harold Gilman, William Rothenstein, Walter Sickert, Sir William Nicholson and Osbert and Edith Sitwell. He enjoyed the society and conversation of literary men, particularly in the rarefied downstairs at the Café Royal. He also met regularly with W. H. Hudson, Edward Garrett and others at the Mont Blanc Restaurant in Soho.

For his poetry Davies drew much on experiences with the seamier side of life, but also on his love of nature. By the time he took a prominent place in the Edward Marsh Georgian Poetry series, he was an established figure, generally known for the opening lines of the poem "Leisure", first published in Songs of Joy and Others in 1911: "What is this life if, full of care / We have no time to stand and stare...."

In October 1917 his work appeared in the anthology Welsh Poets: A Representative English selection from Contemporary Writers collated by A. G. Prys-Jones and published by Erskine Macdonald of London.

In 1921, Davies moved to 13 Avery Row, Brook Street, renting from Quaker poet Olaf Baker. He was finding work difficult with rheumatism and other ailments. Harlow (1993) lists a total of 14 BBC broadcasts of Davies reading his work made between 1924 and 1940 (now held in the BBC broadcast archive) though none included his most famous work, "Leisure". Later Days, a 1925 sequel to The Autobiography of a Super-Tramp, describes the beginnings of Davies's writing career and his acquaintance with Belloc, Shaw, de la Mare and others. He became "the most painted literary man of his day", thanks to Augustus John, Sir William Nicholson, Dame Laura Knight and Sir William Rothenstein. Epstein's bronze of Davies's head was a successful smaller work.

=== Marriage and later life ===
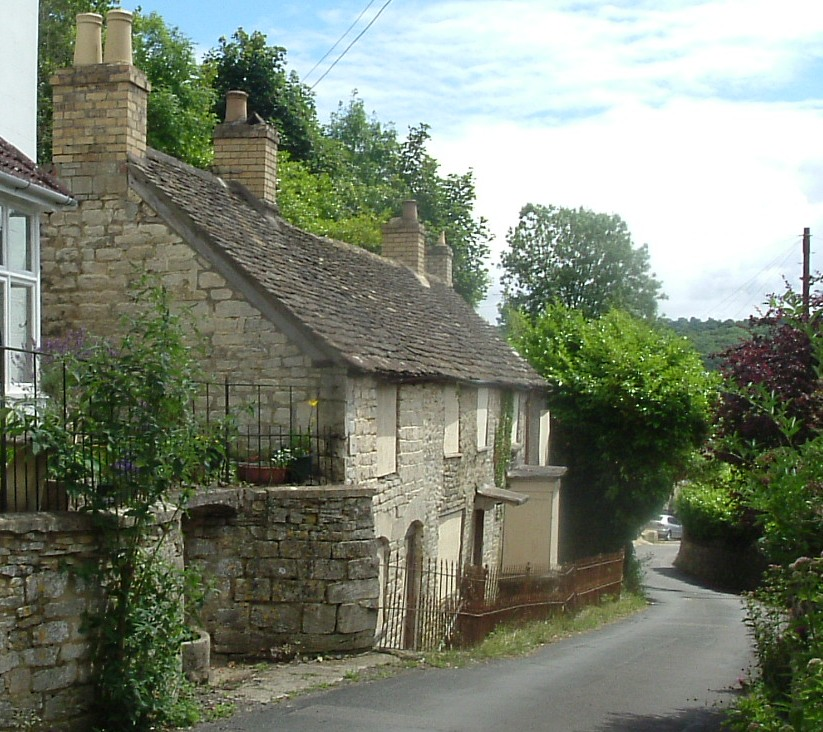
Davies' last home "Glendower", Watledge Road, Nailsworth, Gloucestershire

On 5 February 1923, Davies married 23-year-old Helen Matilda Payne at the Register Office, East Grinstead, Sussex, and the couple set up home in the town at Tor Leven, Cantelupe Road. According to a witness, Conrad Aiken, the ceremony found Davies "in a near panic".

Davies's book Young Emma was a frank, often disturbing account of his life before and after picking Helen up at a bus-stop in the Edgware Road near Marble Arch. He had caught sight of her just getting off the bus and describes her wearing a "saucy-looking little velvet cap with tassels". Still unmarried, Helen was pregnant at the time. (Note: Stonesifier describes her as "a twenty-two-year-old Sussex girl, a nurse in a hospital to which he was sent for treatment" when very ill in the spring of 1922. While Dame Veronica Wedgwood, in her preface to the book, calls Helen "a country girl who had come to London, become pregnant by a man whom she could not marry, was without resources and afraid to go back to her people.") While living with Davies in London, before the couple were married, Helen suffered a miscarriage. Davies initially planned on publication of the book, and sent it to Jonathan Cape in August 1924. He later changed his mind and asked for its return, and for the destruction of all copies. Cape in fact retained the copies and, after Davies's death, asked George Bernard Shaw as to the advisability of publication. Shaw gave a negative reply and the work remained unpublished until after Helen's death in 1979.

The couple lived quietly and happily, moving from East Grinstead to Sevenoaks, then to Malpas House, Oxted in Surrey, and finally to a string of five residences at Nailsworth, Gloucestershire, the first being a comfortable, detached 19th-century stone-built house. Axpills (later known as Shenstone), with a garden of character. He lived in several houses, all close to one another, in his last seven years. His last home was the small roadside cottage Glendower in the hamlet of Watledge. The couple had no children.

In 1930 Davies edited the poetry anthology Jewels of Song for Cape, choosing works by over 120 poets, including William Blake, Thomas Campion, Shakespeare, Tennyson and W. B. Yeats. Of his own poems he added only "The Kingfisher" and "Leisure". The collection reappeared as An Anthology of Short Poems in 1938.

=== Decline and death ===
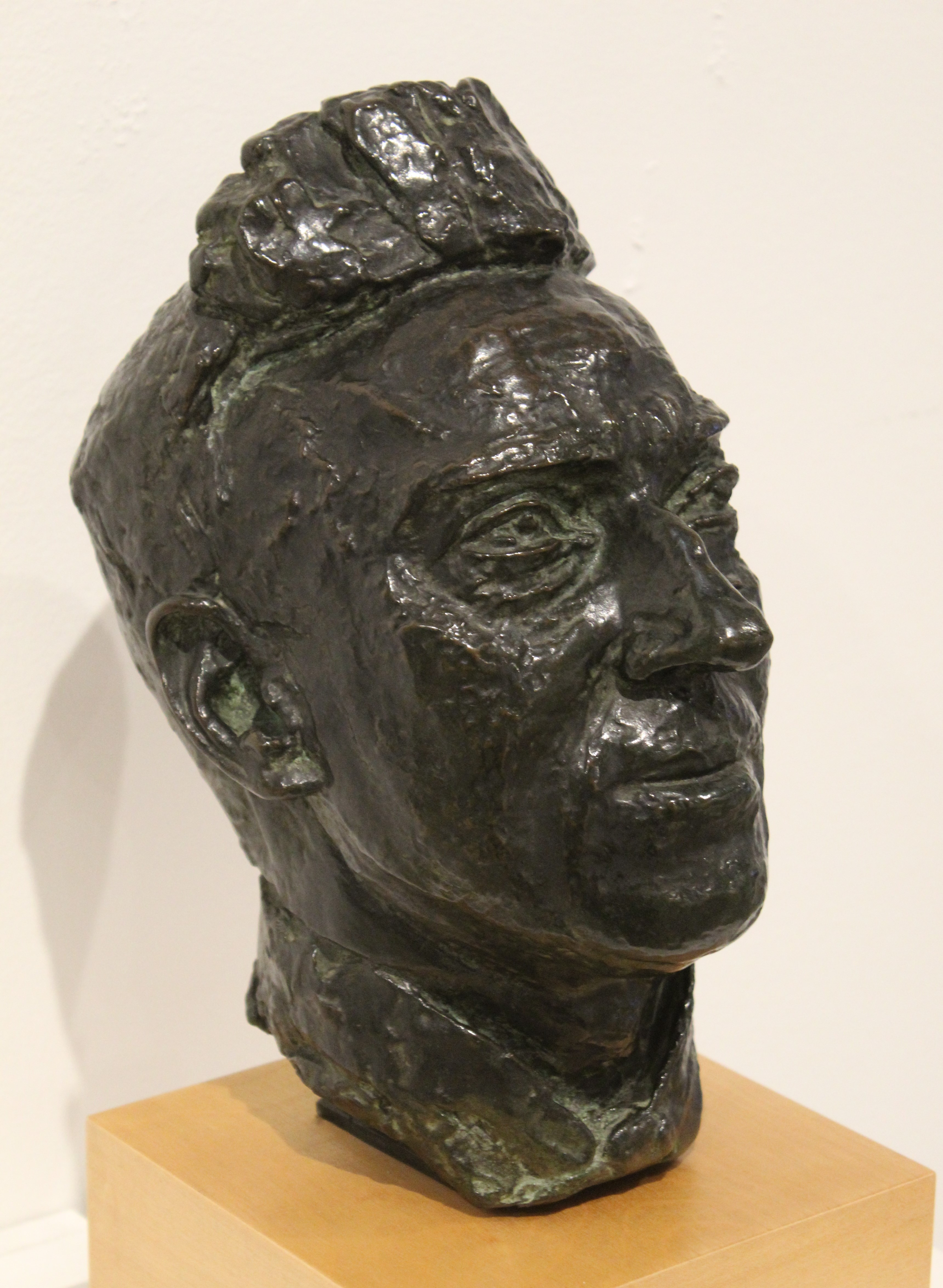
W.H. Davies, 1916, by Jacob Epstein

In September 1938, Davies attended the unveiling of a plaque in his honour at the Church House Inn; poet laureate, John Masefield, gave an address. Davies was unwell; the unveiling was his last public appearance.

Prior to his marriage, Davies often stayed in London with his friend Osbert Sitwell and Sitwell's brother Sacheverell. They enjoyed walks along the River Thames and attended musical recitals given by Violet Gordon-Woodhouse. Having moved to Watledge, these friendships continued. Some three months before his death, Davies was visited at Glendower by Gordon-Woodhouse and the Sitwells, Davies being too ill to travel. Sitwell noted that Davies looked "very ill", but that "his head, so typical of him in its rustic and nautical boldness, with the black hair now greying a little, but as stiff as ever, surrounding his high bony forehead, seemed to have acquired an even more sculptural quality." Helen privately told Sitwell that Davies' heart showed "alarming symptoms of weakness" caused, according to doctors, by the continuous dragging weight of his wooden leg. Helen kept the true extent of the medical diagnosis from her husband.

Davies himself confided in Sitwell:

I've never been ill before, really, except when I had that accident and lost my leg.... And, d'you know, I grow so irritable when I've got that pain, I can't bear the sound of people's voices.... Sometimes I feel I should like to turn over on my side and die.

Davies' health continued to decline and he died in September 1940 at the age of 69. Never a churchgoer in adult life, he was cremated at the Bouncer's Lane Cemetery, Cheltenham, and his remains interred there.

=== Glendower ===
From 1949, Glendower was the home of the poet's great-nephew Norman Phillips. In 2003, following a heart attack, Phillips moved into supported accommodation. A support group of local residents, The Friends of Glendower, was established to raise funds for renovation, with the aims of enabling Phillips to return to the cottage and for it to be a commemoration of Davies' life and work. In 2012 signed copies of five of Davies' books were found during restoration, together with personal papers. By 2017, remedial work on the cottage was sufficiently advanced to allow Phillips to return.

== Literary style ==
Davies's main biographer Stonesifer compared the realism, directness and simplicity of Davies' prose to that of Defoe and George Borrow. His style was described by Shaw as that of "a genuine innocent", while the biographer L. Hockey said, "It is as a poet of nature that Davies has become most famous; and it is not surprising that he should have taken nature as his main subject."

For his honorary degree in 1926, Davies was introduced at the University of Wales by Professor W. D. Thomas. Thomas' citation attempted a summary of Davies' themes, style and tone:

"A Welshman, a poet of distinction, and a man in whose work much of the peculiarly Welsh attitude to life is expressed with singular grace and sincerity. He combines a vivid sense of beauty with affection for the homely, keen zest for life and adventure with a rare appreciation of the common, universal pleasures, and finds in those simple things of daily life a precious quality, a dignity and a wonder that consecrate them. Natural, simple and unaffected, he is free from sham in feeling and artifice in expression. He has re-discovered for those who have forgotten them, the joys of simple nature. He has found romance in that which has become commonplace; and of the native impulses of an unspoilt heart, and the responses of a sensitive spirit, he has made a new world of experience and delight. He is a lover of life, accepting it and glorying in it. He affirms values that were falling into neglect, and in an age that is mercenary reminds us that we have the capacity for spiritual enjoyment."

Davies' friend and mentor, the poet Edward Thomas, drew a comparison with the work of Wordsworth: "He can write commonplace or inaccurate English, but it is also natural to him to write, such as Wordsworth wrote, with the clearness, compactness and felicity which make a man think with shame how unworthily, through natural stupidity or uncertainty, he manages his native tongue. In subtlety he abounds, and where else today shall we find simplicity like this?"

Daniel George, reviewing the 1943 Collected Poems for Tribune, called Davies' work "new yet old, recalling now Herrick, now Blake – of whom it was said, as of Goldsmith, that he wrote like an angel but according to those who had met him talked like poor Poll, except that he was no parrot of other people's opinions."

== Appearance and character ==
Osbert Sitwell, a close friend, thought Davies bore an "unmistakable likeness" to his distant actor cousin Henry Irving. Sitwell described him as having a "long and aquiline" face and "broad-shouldered and vigorous".

In an introduction to his 1951 The Essential W. H. Davies, Brian Waters said Davies's "character and personality rather than good looks were the keynote to his expressive face."

== Honours, memorials and legacy ==
As I walked down the waterside
This silent morning, wet and dark;
Before the cocks in farmyards crowed,
Before the dogs began to bark;
Before the hour of five was struck
By old Westminster's mighty clock:

As I walked down the waterside
This morning, in the cold damp air,
I saw a hundred women and men
Huddled in rags and sleeping there:
These people have no work, thought I,
And long before their time they die.

— from "The Sleepers", Songs of Joy and Others (1911)

In 1926 Davies received a degree of Doctor Litteris, honoris causa, from the University of Wales. He returned to his native Newport in 1930, where he was honoured with a luncheon at the Westgate Hotel. His return in September 1938 for the unveiling of the plaque in his honour proved to be his last public appearance.

The National Library of Wales holds a large collection of Davies manuscripts. Items include poems such as a copy of "A Boy's Sorrow", a 16-line poem about the death of a neighbor which appears never to have been published and a collection, Quiet Streams, again with some unpublished poems. Other materials include an archive of press cuttings, a collection of personal papers and letters, and a number of photographs of Davies and his family, as well as a sketch of him by William Rothenstein.

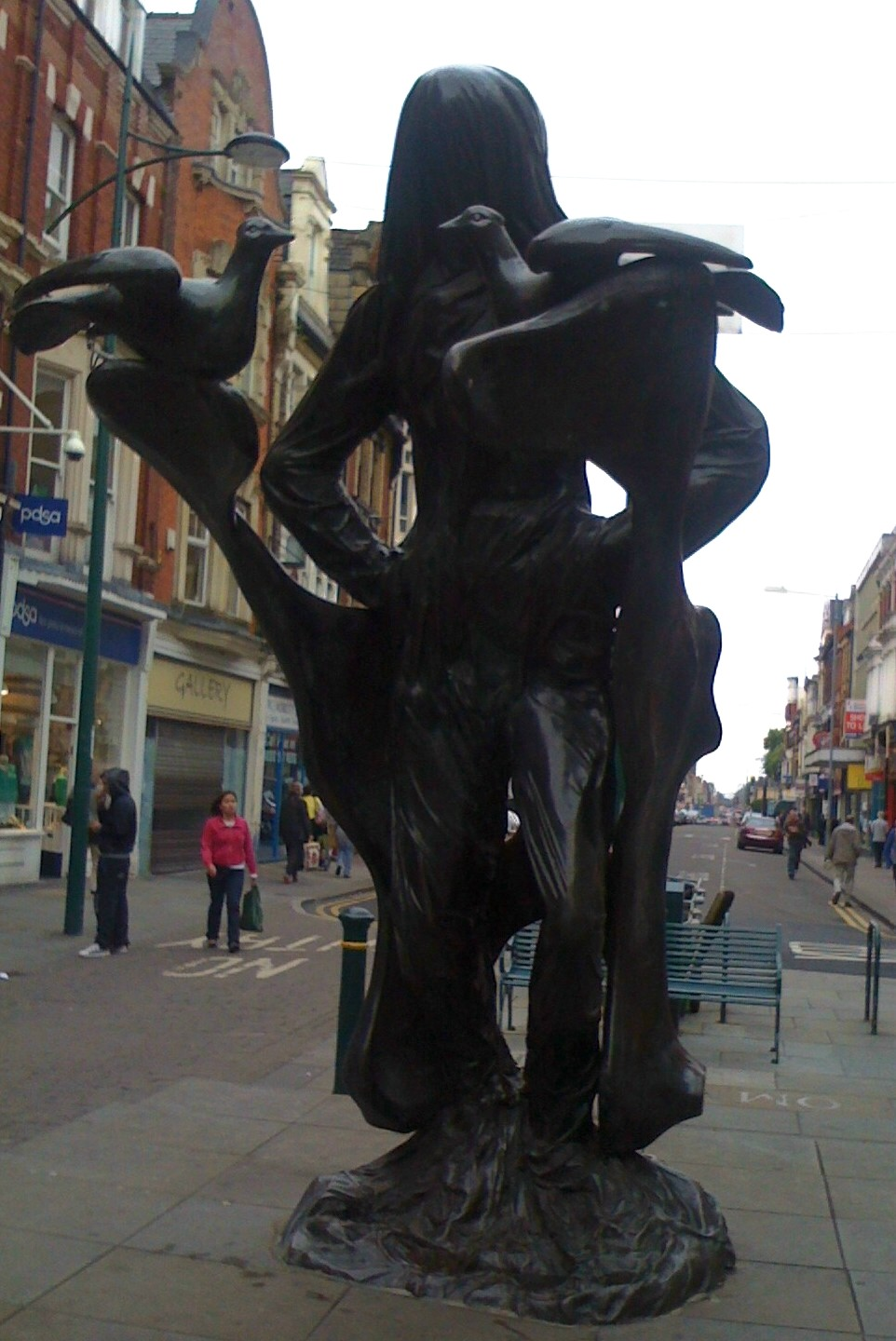
Stand and Stare, statue by Paul Bothwell-Kincaid, Commercial Street, Newport

Davies's Autobiography of a Super-Tramp influenced a generation of British writers, including Gerald Brenan (1894–1987).

In 1951 Jonathan Cape published The Essential W. H. Davies, selected and introduced by Brian Waters, a Gloucestershire poet and writer whose work Davies admired, who described him as "about the last of England's professional poets". The collection included The Autobiography of a Super-tramp, and extracts from Beggars, A Poet's Pilgrimage, Later Days, My Birds and My Garden, along with over 100 poems arranged by period of publication period.

Many Davies poems have been set to music. "Money, O!" was set for voice and piano in G minor, by Michael Head, whose 1929 Boosey & Hawkes collection included settings for "The Likeness", "The Temper of a Maid", "Natures' Friend", "Robin Redbreast" and "A Great Time". "A Great Time" has also been set by Otto Freudenthal (1934–2015), Wynn Hunt (born 1910) and Newell Wallbank (1914–1996). There are also three songs by Sir Arthur Bliss: "Thunderstorms", "This Night", and "Leisure", and "The Rain" for voice and piano, by Margaret Campbell Bruce, published in 1951 by J. Curwen and Sons.

The experimental Irish folk group Dr. Strangely Strange sang and quoted from "Leisure" on their 1970 album Heavy Petting, with harmonium accompaniment. A musical adaptation of this poem with John Karvelas (vocals) and Nick Pitloglou (piano) and an animated film by Pipaluk Polanksi can be found on YouTube. Again in 1970, Fleetwood Mac recorded "Dragonfly", a song with lyrics from Davies's 1927 poem "The Dragonfly", as did the English singer-songwriter and instrumentalist Blake for his 2011 album The First Snow. In 1970 British rock band Supertramp named themselves after The Autobiography of a Super-Tramp.

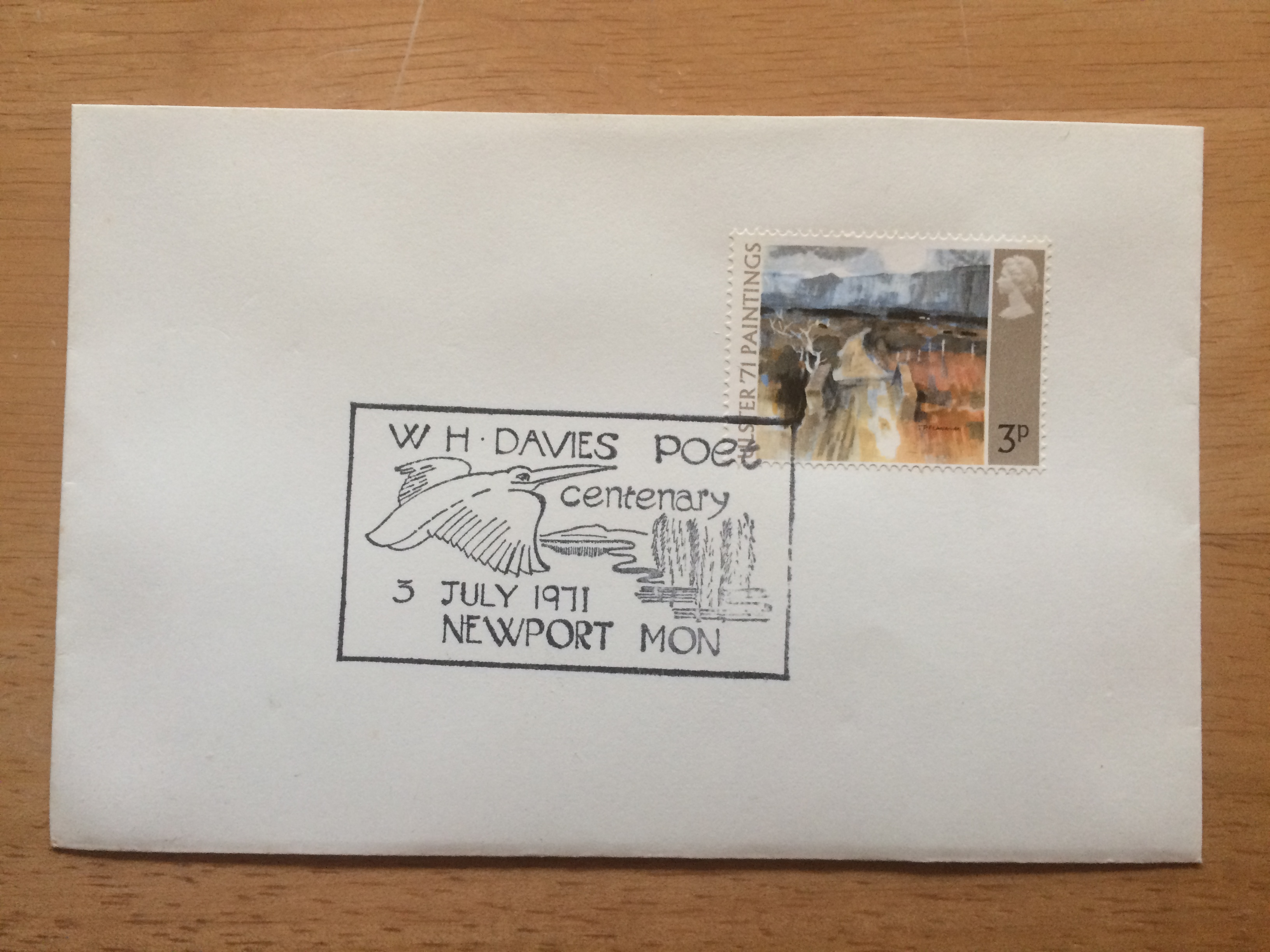
Commemorative postmark, 1971

On 3 July 1971 a commemorative postmark was issued by the UK Post Office for Davies's centenary.

A controversial statue by Paul Bothwell-Kincaid, inspired by the poem "Leisure", was unveiled in Commercial Street, Newport in December 1990, to mark Davies's work, on the 50th anniversary of his death. The bronze head of Davies by Epstein, from January 1917, regarded by many as the most accurate artistic impression of Davies and a copy of which Davies owned himself, may be found at Newport Museum and Art Gallery, donated by Viscount Tredegar).

In August 2010 the play Supertramp, Sickert and Jack the Ripper by Lewis Davies included an imagined sitting by Davies for a portrait by Walter Sickert. It was first staged at the Edinburgh Festival.

== Works ==
- The Soul's Destroyer and Other Poems (of the author, The Farmhouse, 1905) (also Alston Rivers, 1907), (Jonathan Cape, 1921)
- New Poems (Elkin Mathews, 1907)
- Nature Poems (Fifield, 1908)
- The Autobiography of a Super-Tramp (Fifield, 1908) (autobiographical)
- How It Feels To Be Out of Work (The English Review, 1 December 1908)
- Beggars (Duckworth, 1909) (autobiographical)
- Farewell to Poesy (Fifield, 1910)
- Songs of Joy and Others (Fifield, 1911)
- A Weak Woman (Duckworth, 1911)
- The True Traveller (Duckworth, 1912) (autobiographical)
- Foliage: Various Poems (Elkin Mathews, 1913)
- Nature (Batsford, 1914) (autobiographical)
- The Bird of Paradise (Methuen, 1914)
- Child Lovers (Fifield, 1916)
- Collected Poems (Fifield, 1916)
- A Poet's Pilgrimage (or A Pilgrimage In Wales) (Melrose, 1918) (autobiographical)
- Forty New Poems (Fifield, 1918)
- Raptures (Beaumont Press, 1918)
- The Song of Life (Fifield, 1920)
- The Captive Lion and Other Poems (Yale University Press, on the Kingsley Trust Association Publication Fund, 1921)
- Form (ed. Davies and Austin O. Spare, Vol 1, Numbers 1, 2 & 3, 1921/1922)
- The Hour of Magic (illustrated by Sir William Nicholson, Jonathan Cape, 1922)
- Shorter Lyrics of the Twentieth Century, 1900–1922 (ed Davies, Bodley Head, 1922) (anthology)
- True Travellers. A Tramp's Opera in Three Acts (illustrated by Sir William Nicholson, Jonathan Cape, 1923)
- Collected Poems, 1st Series (Jonathan Cape, 1923)
- Collected Poems, 2nd Series (Jonathan Cape, 1923)
- Selected Poems (illustrated with woodcuts by Stephen Bone, Jonathan Cape, 1923)
- What I Gained and Lost By Not Staying at School (Teachers World 29, June 1923)
- 'Poets and Critics' – New Statesman, 21, (8 September 1923)
- Secrets (Jonathan Cape, 1924)
- Moll Flanders, introduction by Davies (Simpkin, Marshall, Hamilton, Kent and Co, 1924)
- A Poet's Alphabet (illustrated by Dora Batty, Jonathan Cape, 1925)
- Later Days (Jonathan Cape, 1925) (autobiographical)
- Augustan Book of Poetry: Thirty Selected Poems (Benn, 1925)
- The Song of Love (Jonathan Cape, 1926)
- The Adventures of Johnny Walker, Tramp (Jonathan Cape, 1926) (autobiographical)
- A Poet's Calendar (Jonathan Cape, 1927)
- Dancing Mad (Jonathan Cape, 1927)
- The Collected Poems of W. H. Davies (Jonathan Cape, 1928)
- Moss and Feather (illustrated by Sir William Nicholson, Faber and Gwyer, No. 10 in the Faber Ariel poems pamphlet series, 1928)
- Forty Nine Poems (selected and illustrated by Jacynth Parsons (daughter of Karl Parsons), Medici Society, 1928)
- Selected Poems (arranged by Edward Garnett, introduction by Davies, Gregynog Press, 1928)
- Ambition and Other Poems (Jonathan Cape, 1929)
- Jewels of Song (ed., anthology, Jonathan Cape, 1930)
- In Winter (illustrated by Edward Carrick, Fytton Armstrong, limited edition of 290, special limited edition of 15 on handmade paper also hand-coloured, 1931)
- Poems 1930–31 (illustrated by Elizabeth Montgomery, Jonathan Cape, 1931)
- The Lover's Song Book (Gregynog Press, 1933)
- My Birds (with engravings by Hilda M. Quick, Jonathan Cape, 1933)
- My Garden (with illustrations by Hilda M. Quick, Jonathan Cape, 1933)
- 'Memories' – School, (1 November 1933)
- The Poems of W. H. Davies: A Complete Collection (Jonathan Cape, 1934)
- Love Poems (Jonathan Cape, 1935)
- The Birth of Song (Jonathan Cape, 1936)
- 'Epilogue' to The Romance of the Echoing Wood, (a Welsh tale by W. J. T. Collins, R. H. Johns Ltd, 1937)
- An Anthology of Short Poems (ed., anthology, Jonathan Cape, 1938)
- The Loneliest Mountain (Jonathan Cape, 1939)
- The Poems of W. H. Davies (Jonathan Cape, 1940)
- Common Joys and Other Poems (Faber and Faber, 1941)
- Collected Poems of W. H. Davies (with Introduction by Osbert Sitwell, Jonathan Cape, 1943)
- Complete Poems of W. H. Davies (with preface by Daniel George and introduction by Osbert Sitwell, Jonathan Cape, 1963)
- Young Emma (Jonathan Cape, written 1924, published 1980) (autobiographical)

== Sources ==
- M. Cullup, 2014, W. H. Davies: Man and Poet – A Reassessment, London: Greenwich Exchange Ltd., ISBN 978-1-906075-88-0
- S. Harlow, 1993, W. H. Davies – a Bibliography, Winchester: Oak Knoll Books, St.Paul's Bibliographies. ISBN 1-873040-00-8
- L. Hockey, 1971, W. H. Davies, University of Wales Press on behalf of the Welsh Arts Council, (limited edition of 750), ISBN 978-0-900768-84-2
- B. Hooper, 2004, Time to Stand and Stare: A Life of W. H. Davies with Selected Poems, London: Peter Owen Publishers, ISBN 0-7206-1205-5
- T. Moult, 1934, W. H. Davies, London: Thornton Butterworth
- L. Normand, 2003, W. H. Davies, Bridgend: Poetry Wales Press Ltd, ISBN 1-85411-260-0
- Richard J. Stonesifer, 1963, W. H. Davies – A Critical Biography, London: Jonathan Cape (first full biography of Davies), ISBN B0000CLPA3
- R. Waterman, 2015, W. H. Davies, the True Traveller: A Reader, Manchester: Fyfield/Carcanet Press, ISBN 978-1-78410-087-2

== Notable anthologies ==
- Collected Poems of W. H. Davies, London: Jonathan Cape, 1940
- B. Waters, ed., The Essential W. H. Davies, London: Jonathan Cape, 1951
- Rory Waterman, ed. and introd., W. H. Davies, the True Traveller: A Reader (Manchester: Fyfield/Carcanet Press, 2015
