= Mochrum Loch =

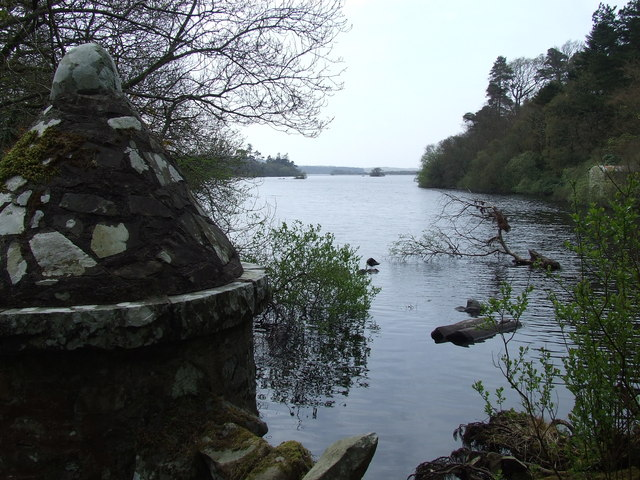

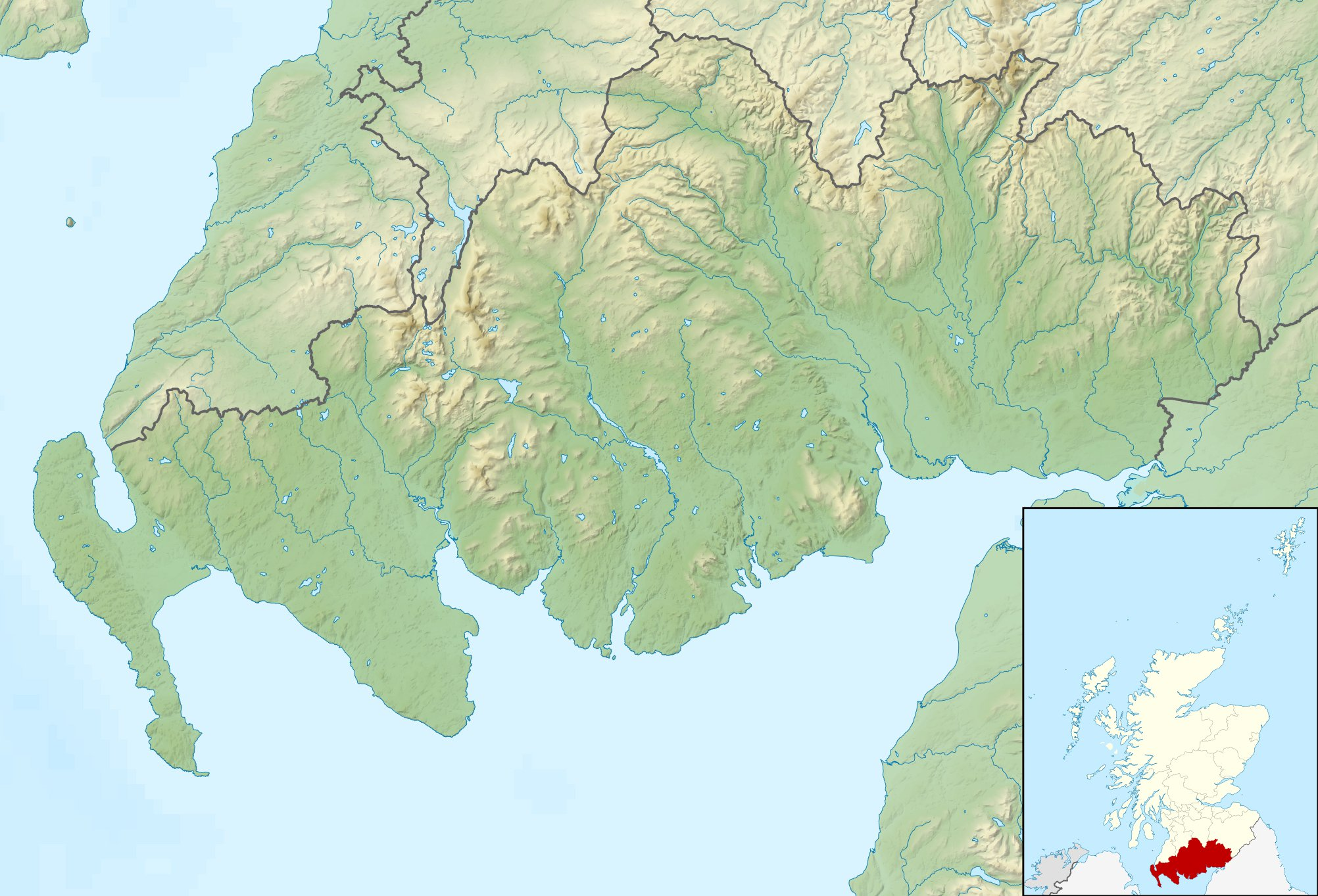
- Location within Dumfries and Galloway
- Location: Dumfries and Galloway, Scotland
- Coordinates: 54.842300°N 4.649300°W
- Type: freshwater loch
- Primary inflows: Castle Loch Burn
- Primary outflows: Water of Malzie
- Basin countries: Scotland
- Max. length: 1.5 mi (2.4 km)
- Max. width: 0.33 mi (0.53 km)
- Surface area: 92 ha (230 acres)
- Average depth: 7 ft (2.1 m)
- Max. depth: 13 ft (4.0 m)
- Water volume: 68,000,000 ft^{3} (1,900,000 m^{3})
- Shore length^{1}: 10.2 km (6.3 mi)
- Surface elevation: 75 m (246 ft)
- Islands: 8 islets
- ^{1} Shore length is not a well-defined measure.

Mochrum Loch is a large, irregular shaped, shallow, freshwater loch in Dumfries and Galloway, in the Southern Uplands of south-west Scotland. It lies approximately 8 mi (13 km) west of the town of Wigtown. The loch has several rocky islets.

== Survey ==
The loch was surveyed in 1903 by James Murray and later charted as part of Sir John Murray's Bathymetrical Survey of Fresh-Water Lochs of Scotland 1897-1909.
