= Castle Loch, Port William =

Castle Loch
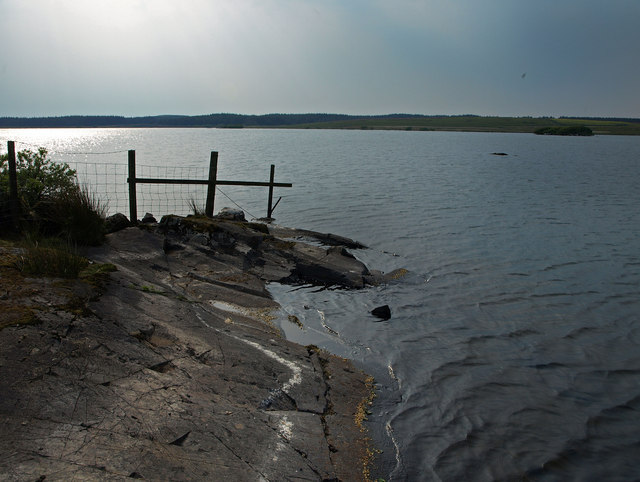

- Location within Scotland Location within the United Kingdom Location within Europe
- Location: Dumfries and Galloway, Scotland
- Coordinates: 54.8495°N 4.67030°W
- Type: freshwater loch
- Primary inflows: several small burns
- Primary outflows: Castle Loch burn
- Basin countries: Scotland
- Max. length: 1.25 mi (2.01 km)
- Max. width: 0.5 mi (0.80 km)
- Surface area: 92.5 ha (229 acres)
- Average depth: 6.5 ft (2.0 m)
- Max. depth: 11 ft (3.4 m)
- Water volume: 65,000,000 ft^{3} (1,800,000 m^{3})
- Shore length^{1}: 6.4 km (4.0 mi)
- Surface elevation: 85 m (279 ft)
- Islands: 2 islets
- ^{1} Shore length is not a well-defined measure.

Castle Loch is a large, shallow, freshwater loch in Dumfries and Galloway, in the Southern Uplands of south-west Scotland. It lies to the west of Mochrum Loch and about 9 mi (14 km) west of the town of Wigtown. The loch has 2 islets.

== Survey ==
The loch was surveyed in 1903 by James Murray and later charted as part of Sir John Murray's Bathymetrical Survey of Fresh-Water Lochs of Scotland 1897-1909.
