= Donaghadee Lighthouse =

Lighthouse in Northern Ireland

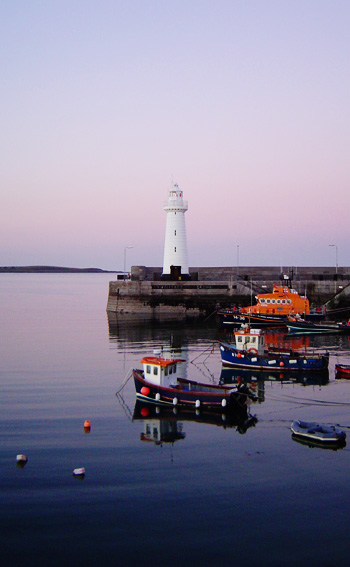
- Donaghadee harbour
- Location: Donaghadee; County Down; Northern Ireland
- Coordinates: 54.645049°N 5.530944°W

Tower
- Constructed: 1836
- Construction: cut limestone tower
- Automated: 2 October 1934
- Height: 16 metres (52 ft)
- Shape: tapered cylindrical tower with balcony and lantern
- Markings: white tower and lantern, black plinth
- Operator: Commissioners of Irish Lights

Light
- Focal height: 17 metres (56 ft)
- Intensity: 20,000 candela
- Range: white: 17 nautical miles (31 km; 20 mi) red: 13 nautical miles (24 km; 15 mi)
- Characteristic: Iso WR 4s.
- Northern Ireland no.: CIL-1210

Donaghadee Lighthouse is a lighthouse in Donaghadee County Down, Northern Ireland. Donaghadee is probably best known for its lighthouse and harbour. There has been a haven for ships at Donaghadee (locally known colloquially as the 'Dee') for centuries, and there has also existed a harbour since at least the 17th century.

== Construction ==
Viscount Montgomery's harbour (1626; improved 1640), superseding what had hitherto been probably only a small jetty, was built and maintained as a result of the Royal Warrant of 1616 which limited travel between the Ards and the Rhins of Galloway to this port, and that at Portpatrick also owned by Montgomery. It was described by Harris in 1744 as 'a curving quay about 400 feet (120 m) long and 22 feet (6.7 m) wide built of uncemented stones'. It ran from the shore at the north end of the Parade in a broad arc, bent against the open sea, towards the southern end of the present north pier.

Much patched and decrepit, the quay was virtually rebuilt, though along the original line, between 1775 and 1785 by the landlord, Daniel Delacherois, probably with the help of John Smeaton, the distinguished civil engineer who had apparently made earlier more elaborate plans for extending the harbour, and who had just rebuilt Portpatrick harbour. The old quay remained until after the completion of the new harbour, and then, despite its continued favour by local fishermen, was removed for local wall building about 1833. (It appears in the 1832 drawing but not on the first O.S. map of 1834).

The foundation stone of the new harbour was laid by the Marquis of Downshire on 1 August 1821. The initial plans and surveys for this ambitious undertaking had been made by John Rennie Senior, the celebrated engineer whose works included Waterloo, Southwark and London Bridges over the Thames. However, he died within two months of beginning the work, and was succeeded by his son, John, later Sir John Rennie. He had as his resident engineer a fellow Scot, the seasoned marine builder, David Logan, who had assisted Robert Stevenson at the Bell Rock Lighthouse (1807–1810).

The new harbour had to have greater depth to accommodate steam packets. Rock blasted from the sea bed, within the harbour area and further south in what became known as the Quarry Hole at Meetinghouse Point, was used to form the outer slopes of the two piers; but the inner faces were built of limestone from the Moelfre quarries of Anglesea. This 'Anglesea marble' lends itself to the finest ashlar dressing and the new piers remain a triumph of stone carving. The flights of steps display special skill in the deep diagonal binding of each solid step, providing a typically robust engineer's response to the wear of seaboots and waves alike. The harbour consists of two independent piers running north-westwards out to sea; parallel nearer the shore, they converge at the outer ends to form a harbour mouth 150 feet (46 m) wide. At low tide, the water in the harbour is fifteen feet deep.

== See also ==
- List of lighthouses in the United Kingdom
