= Stoneykirk =

Coordinates: 54.837°N 4.977°W

Stoneykirk: Scottish Gaelic: Eaglais Steafain
- Location within Dumfries and Galloway
- Population: 1,235 (2001)
- OS grid reference: NX0853
- Civil parish: Stoneykirk
- Council area: Dumfries and Galloway
- Lieutenancy area: Wigtown
- Country: Scotland
- Sovereign state: United Kingdom
- Post town: Stranraer
- Postcode district: DG9
- Dialling code: 01776
- Police: Scotland
- Fire: Scottish
- Ambulance: Scottish
- UK Parliament: Dumfries and Galloway
- Scottish Parliament: Galloway and Upper Nithsdale

Stoneykirk (Scottish Gaelic: Eaglais Steafain) is an area and a village in the heart of the Rhins of Galloway, Wigtownshire, in the administrative council area of Dumfries and Galloway, Scotland nearly 10 miles (16 km) in length and 3 1/2 miles (5.6 km) in breadth, bounded on the east by the bay of Luce, and on the west by the Irish Channel, 5 miles (8 km) south of Stranraer.

The area is about 21,500 acres (8,700 ha), of which 19,000 acres (7,700 ha) are arable, 375 acres (152 ha) woodland and plantations, and the remainder, whereof 1,100 acres (450 ha) might be reclaimed, moorland.

Stoneykirk has a community council

Knockinaam Lodge, Port Spittal, Stoneykirk, because of its remoteness was the location for a secret meeting between Sir Winston Churchill and General Eisenhower during the Second World War to discuss the D-Day plans.

The A716 runs through part of the village, and a local coach firm, McCulloch's Coaches, is based in the village

James King 407 Service provides a bus link north to Stranraer and south to Sandhead and Drummore

Sandhead overlooks Luce Bay that was used for landing lime and coal.

== The Village ==
Stoneykirk village, located near the RAF West Freugh, developed around the church (now disused) and was named after the church.

The Village Hall houses Rhins Men's Shed.

The village school is situated above the village.

It has one hotel, the 3 star Torrs Warren Country House Hotel, currently closed (December 2025).

== Stoneykirk Church ==
The first church, Saint Stephen's Kirk or Steeniekirk or Stephenskirk or Stevenskirk or Stainiekirk or Staneykirk or Stanykirk or Toskarton or Toskartoun or Toscartoun or Toscarton or Achawan or Auchwane or Achowane or Clayshant, and finally Stoneykirk, was dedicated to St. Stephen and is thought to have been built between the 12th and 14th centuries, possibly under the patronage of the McCulloch family of Ardwell, Toskarton Parish. Clan McCulloch

Toskarton and Clayshant ancient parishes were united to Stoneykirk in 1618.

In 1827 the old medieval parish church was rebuilt.

Stoneykirk Free Church building was erected in 1844 and it passed successively to the United Free Church and the Church of Scotland, and united with Ardwell-Sandhead as Stoneykirk in 1974.

== Kirkmadrine Church ==
Kirkmadryne was dedicated to St. Medran, an early bishop of Ossory. There were three chapels of ease in the parish: St. Brioch's at Kirkmabreck, St. Donan's at Kildonan, and St. Lashrean's at Killaser. The building is no longer used as a church.

The Monogram Stones of Kirkmadrine date from about AD450, which makes them the earliest inscribed Christian gravestones in Scotland and the oldest Christian monuments in Scotland outside Whithorn. The oldest is a pillar stone dating from the 5th Century. All the stones were found in the immediate vicinity, suggesting that it was an early Christian cemetery. See Clachanmore.

== History ==
A cornerstone of McDowell's Garthland Castle (Tower House) bore the date AD1211, and on another towards the east, AD1274.

In 1295 Sir Dougal MacDougall (McDowell) had a Charter from his 3rd cousin, King John Baliol Lord of Galloway, confirming the Barony of Garochloyne with Lougan and Elrig in the Rhinns of Galloway.

Janet McDowell (McDowall), daughter of Uchtred McDowell of Garthland, married Ninian Adair, son of William Adair of Dunskey Castle and of Kilhilt who was killed at Battle of Flodden. Uchtred McDowell, who was also killed at Battle of Flodden, appeared to own the area of Stranraer, and Ninian & Janet McDowell built the Castle of St. John, Stranraer, possibly on her father's Stranraer land. On 27 February 1547, in book "Inquisitiones Speciales", under "Wigton", Uthredus M'Douell was heir to his father Joannis M'Douell de Garthland who was killed at the Battle of Pinkie Cleugh (qui obit apud Pinkiecleuch), of 24 merkland of Garthland, Parish Stoneykirk, and 14 merkland of Lochans (adjoining Garthland) in Parish of Inche. On Ainslie's AD1782 map, William McDowall Esq. was shown at Garthland Castle. Killhilt, the ancient home of the Adair family, is also shown on the 1782 map just north of, and adjoining McDowell's Garthland Castle.

In Wigtownshire, the name McCulloch appears on very early documents, including a Balliol deed dated in 1285 and the Ragman Rolls of 1296. Clan McCulloch

According to a family legend relayed by US Supreme Court Justice James Iredell, in about AD1317 King Robert the Bruce I of Scotland (reigned 1306–29) knighted Captain Cullo og Neil (o’Neil) and chose him to be his standard-bearer and Secretary of State. King Robert the Bruce I granted Sir Cullo og Neil lands and Achawan or Auchwane in Wigtownshire (also known as Kirkmadren, ref. RMS vol VIII, p. 87, #255, Toskartoun, Toscartoun, and Staneykirk, Stoneykirk ), which encompassed the estates and castles of Ardwell and Killasser) near Clachanmore (Low Ardwell). The 42 merkland of Toskerton had been forfeited by Sir John le Mareschal de Toskerton to King Robert I. In 1331 Sir Cullo Og Neil died and left his estate to his eldest son Sir Godfrey, who, accorging to the story, assumed the surname of McCullog. (McCullough / McCullo’c). However, the name was previously well documented in 1285 and 1296 as mentioned above, as well as the 1305 appointment of Thomas McCulloch as Sheriff of Wigtownshire.

Barony of Achowane & Baronia Killasser On 7 July 1618 William McCulloch of Mertoun (Myretoun McCulloch Torhous in Mochrum Parish), with the consent of his eldest son Alexander, ratified a charter of Killasser in the barony of Achowane to William Houston and his wife Katherine Vaus. The subscript mentioned a new deed of baronia Killasser and the castle. Another deed of 29 June 1621, was from William Houston to William Adair, whereby James Glover, Notary Public, recorded delivery of seizin (sasine) of 4 merk land of Carnewell ( Cairnweil ), next to Kirkmadrin Church, in the Parish of Toscartoun.

Killasser Castle is shown on Ainslie's 1782 map as in ruins. It was the ancient seat of the Macculloch of Ardwell.

The Parish List of Wigtownshire AD1684, pp. 57–61, lists the places in Stonykirk Civil Parish.

Adjoining Killasser Castle was William Maxwell of Ardwell at Ardwell House, Stoneykirk Parish, Wigtownshire.

There was a Lord Maxwell who was imprisoned by James VI and released as long as he quit Scotland. In AD1588 Lord Maxwell was in Spain when the Armada was being prepared, and advised Philip that the Galloway ports should be used. The First-class Man of War "Philip & Mary" embedded on shingle not far from Port William, Parish of Mochrum near Sir William Maxwell's Myretoun Castle on the Monreith Estate.

== Archaeology ==
In Archaeological and Historical Collections relating to Ayrshire and Galloway. vol.V. p. 63, Rev. George Wilson lists forts in Stoneykirk - (a)One north of Drumbreddan Bay, not on O.S. map. (b) Doon Castle at Ardwell Point. (c) Kirlauchline, 5 miles (8 km) north of Ardwell Point. (d) Kildonan, a double fort. (e) Knockdoon, the name indicates a fort north of Awhirk. Also Cairns at Doon Hill of Kildrochet.

(b) Doon Castle, near High Ardwell are the remains of the best example of an Iron Age broch in Dumfries and Galloway.

(c) Kirlauchline Promontory Fort, Camp Bay south.

1) East Galdenoch fort (scheduled ancient monument) between East Galdenoch and Freugh airfield. A circular fort with a diameter of 110 m (120 yd). of later prehistoric date.

2) East Galdenoch settlement (scheduled ancient monument) 100 m (110 yd) southeast of East Galdenoch. A prehistoric palisade settlement 120 m (130 yd) long by 60 m (66 yd).

3) East Galdenoch settlement (scheduled ancient monument) 450 m (490 yd) northeast of East Galdenoch. A prehistoric settlement 260 m (280 yd) by 250 m (270 yd).

There are Promontory Forts either side of Float Bay

Dunaldboys Mote south Knockinaam, Iron Age promontory fort on the head of sea cliffs. There is also a standing stone by the side of the Portpatrick-Cairngarroch road.

Balgreggan Motte, Sandhead, stands above the A716. The Motte was the first in a line of early castles along the eastern shore of the Rhins. A 1782 map shows Balgreggan House of Hon. Sir Frederick Maitland.

Farm of Port Spittal, Stoneykirk, 2 miles (3 km) south of Portpatrick. "Burial ground of the four Kings". A Bronze Age Cist and Urn were found in a grave covered with a whinstone slab. The bones can be seen in the Stranraer Museum.

=== Great Spanish Armada ===
In 1588 some vessels belonging to the Great Spanish Armada were wrecked off the western coast, not far from a bay which in commemoration of that circumstance, was named the bay of Float. At Money Point (Money Head) a considerable number of Spanish doubloons were subsequently discovered. See Spanish Armada in Ireland in AD1588, and Spanish Armada wrecks on the western coast of Scotland in the Calendar of State Papers Project Adair at

However, in the book "The Scotch Irish" by Charles A. Hanna, p. 233, it states that in the parish at Stoneykirk are the farms and bay of Float, locally stated to have been so called from the wreck of one of the ships of the Spanish Armada; and the headland close to, corrupted from the Gaelic word "monadh", the hill-head, to " Moneyhead," from money supposed to have been lost from the wreck. The name Float is from the Norse "flott", which means a plain.

== List of Listed Buildings ==
List of listed buildings in Stoneykirk, Dumfries and Galloway

== Gallery. western-shore of the Rhins & Mid-Rhins, Stoneykirk ==
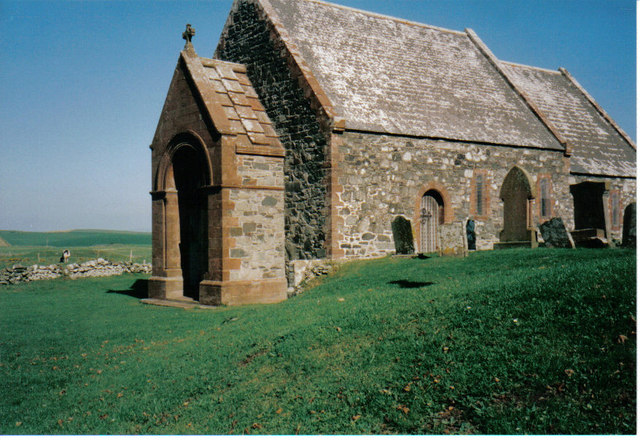
Kirkmadrine Church.

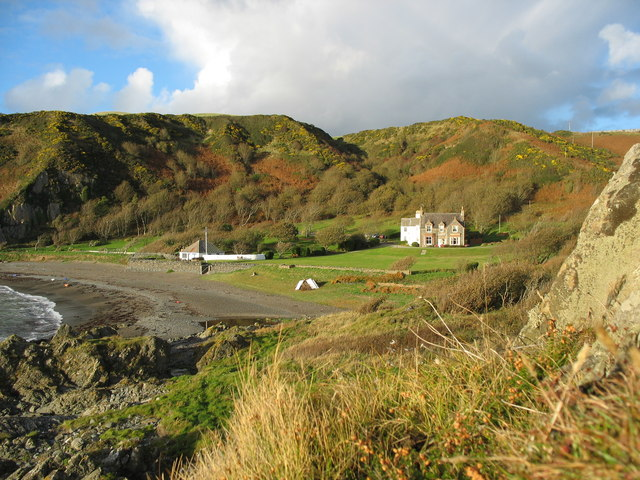
Knockinaam Lodge, Port O Spittal (N.W. Stoneykirk Parish). Meeting place of General Eisenhower & Winston Churchill.

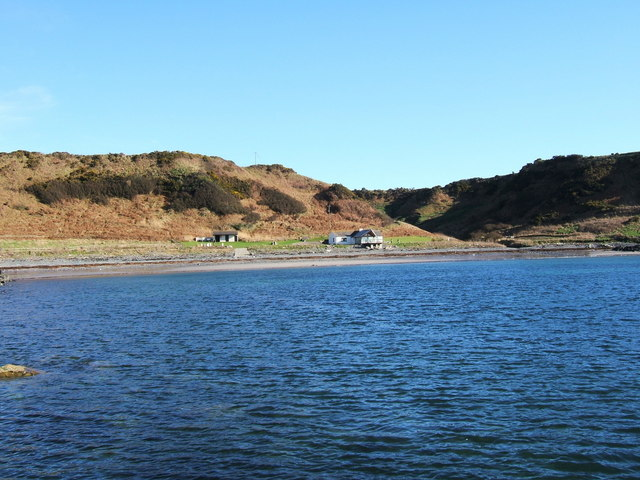
Float Bay with ancient forts on either side.

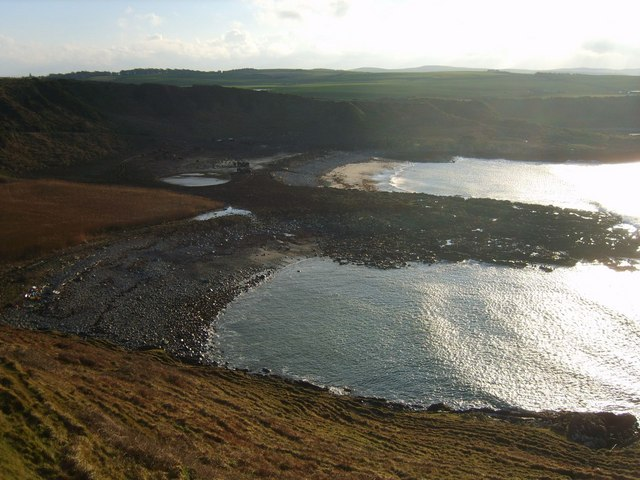
view from hill fort, Drumbreddan Bay.

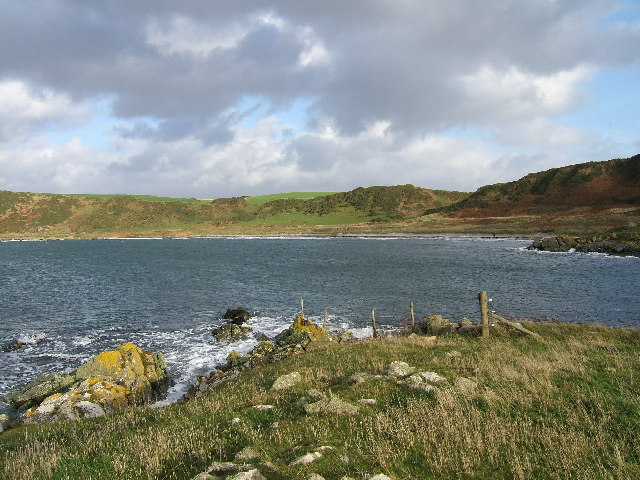
Ardwell Bay.

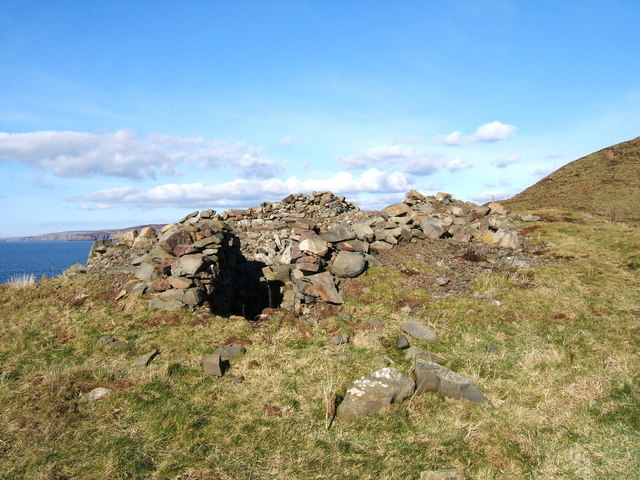
Doon Castle Broch, High Ardwell Bay.

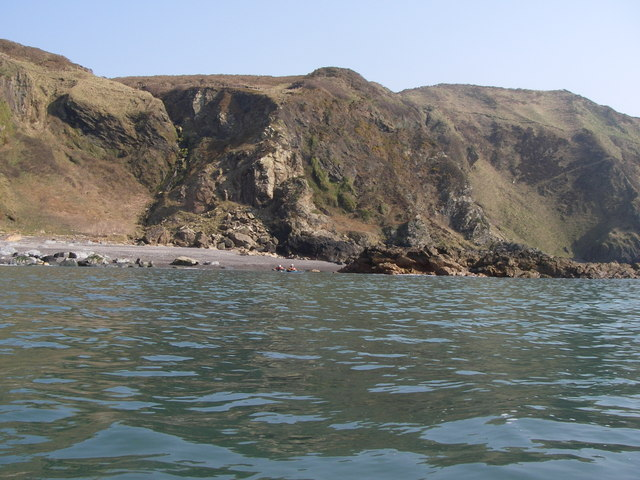
Portayew bay, Kirklauchline Promontory fort to the left at Camp Bay South.

== Gallery. eastern-shore of the Rhins, Stoneykirk ==
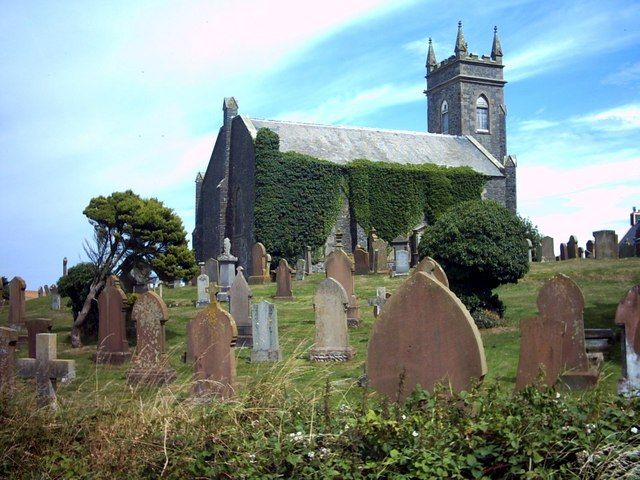
Stoneykirk Church and graveyard (N.E.Stoneykirk Parish).

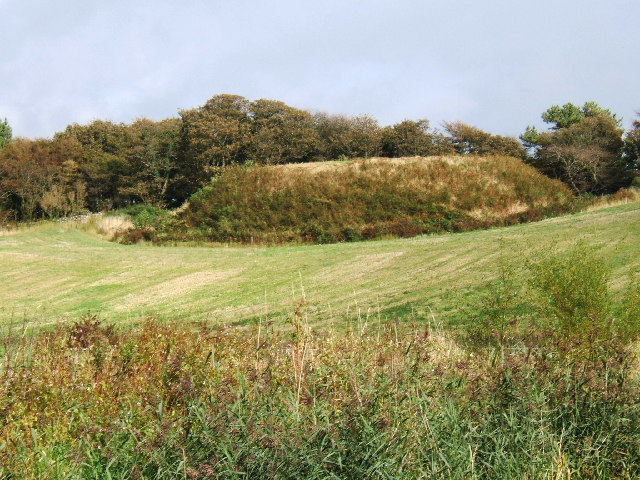
Motte and Bailey castle, Ardwell, by Isles of Killaser, north Chapel Rosan Bay.

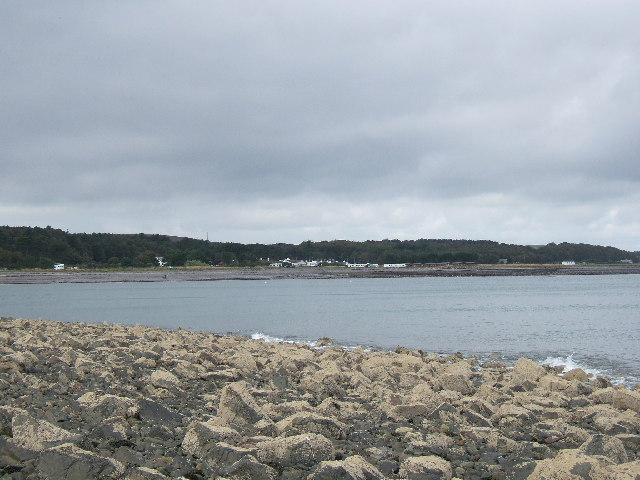
Chapel Rossan Bay looking across to Ardwell village.

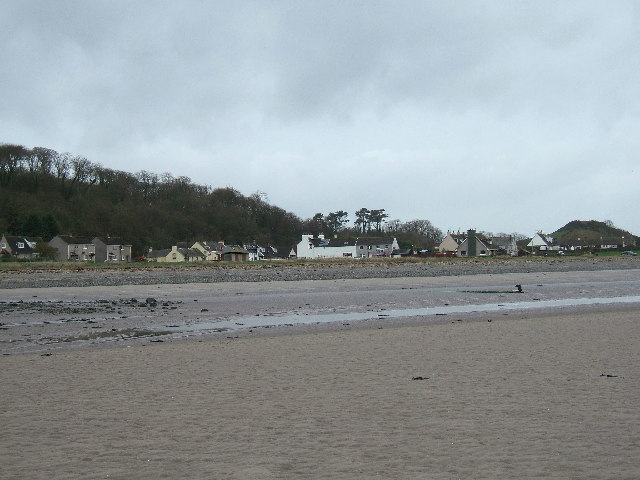
Sandhead Village, Balgreggan Mote Slap on right.

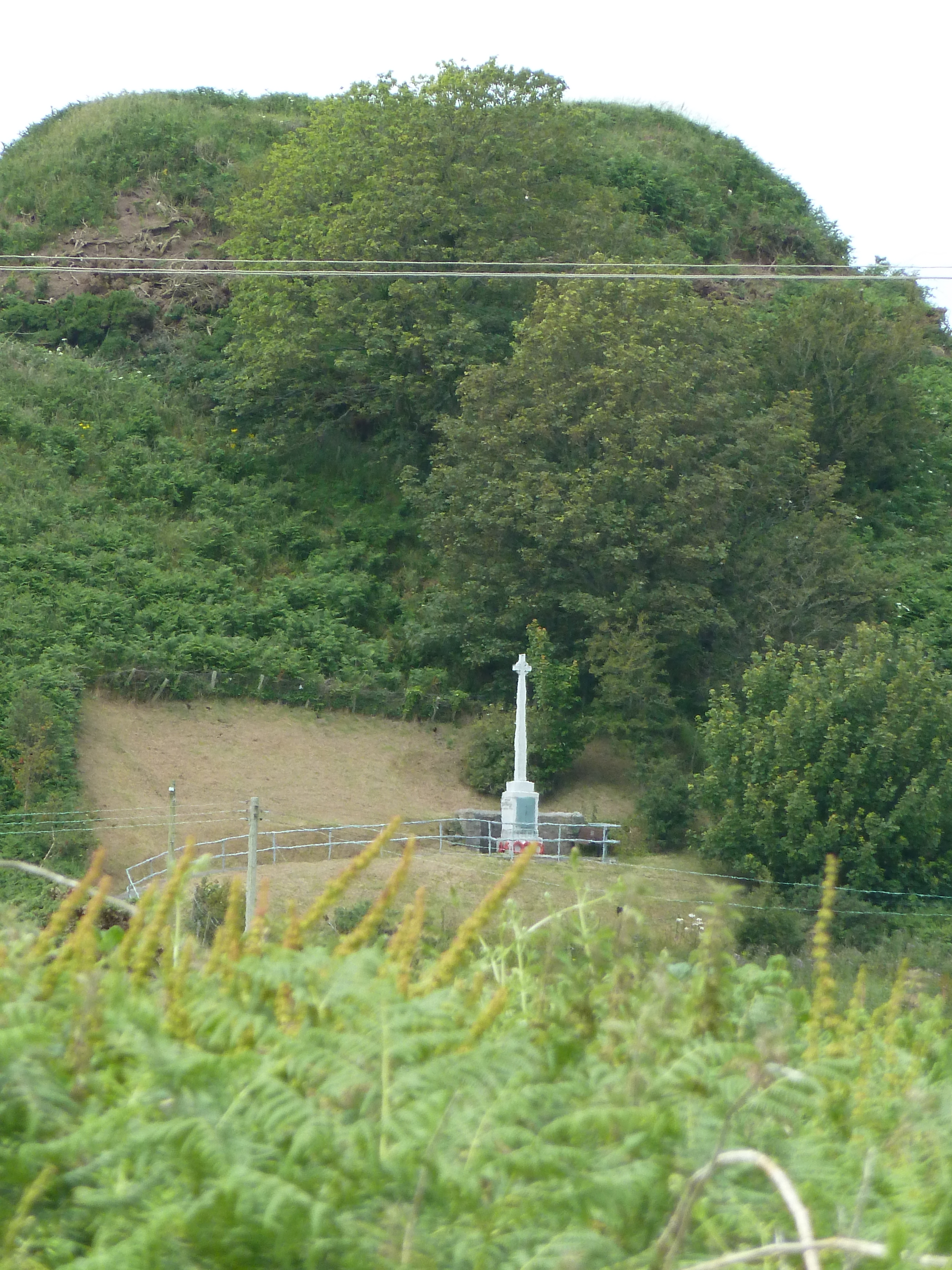
Balgreggan, Sandhead, Stoneykirk, Motte Slap & War Memorial.
