= Clachanmore =

Village in Dumfries and Galloway, Scotland

Coordinates: 54.778549°N 4.981072°W

Clachanmore: Scottish Gaelic: An Clachan Mòr
- Location within Dumfries and Galloway
- Population: 20 estimate
- Council area: Dumfries and Galloway
- Lieutenancy area: Wigtown
- Country: Scotland
- Sovereign state: United Kingdom
- Post town: Stranraer
- Postcode district: DG9
- Dialling code: 01776-860
- Police: Scotland
- Fire: Scottish
- Ambulance: Scottish
- UK Parliament: Dumfries and Galloway
- Scottish Parliament: Galloway and Upper Nithsdale

Clachanmore is a village in the South Rhins of Galloway near Ardwell in the south west of Scotland. It has also been known as Low Ardwell.

The name of the village means 'big village' (Clachan Mòr, in Gaelic) and may derive from a stone circle that formerly stood there; there are remains of a circular enclosure on Barrack Knowe near High Clachanmore farmhouse.

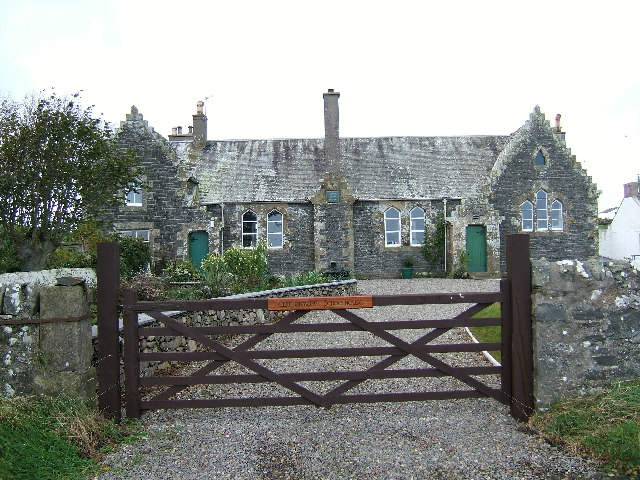
The old schoolhouse at Clachanmore

Clachanmore school is the most prominent building in the village. The building dates to 1831 and was the school for Ardwell. There is a small schoolmaster's house next door. Until 2003 it was an art gallery; it is now a private house.

== Sources ==
- Clachanmore at Gazetteer for Scotland
