= Dunskey Castle =

Castle in Dumfries and Galloway, Scotland

Coordinates: 54.835413°N 5.109874°W

Dunskey Castle is a ruined, 16th-century tower house or castle, built by the Adair family at the site of an earlier 12th-century castle. It is located 0.5 miles (0.80 km) south of the village of Portpatrick, Rhinns, Wigtownshire, on the south-west coast of Scotland.

Dunskey Castle is a scheduled monument, a 'nationally important' archaeological site or historic building, given protection against unauthorised change.

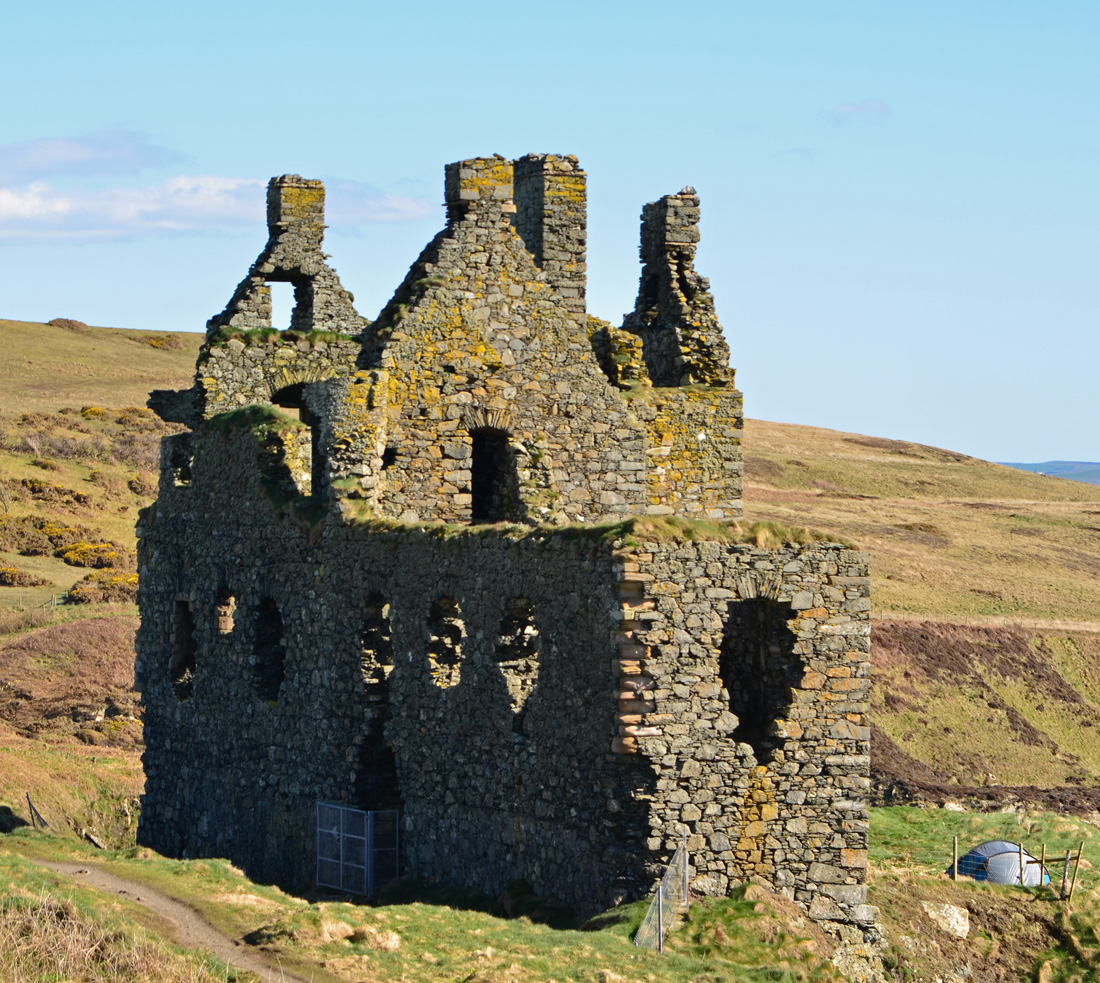
Dunskey Castle

== Description ==
The three-storey L-plan structure is sited on a promontory, with a rock-cut ditch, 15 metres (49 ft) wide by 2.5 metres (8.2 ft) deep, defending the only access, from the north-east. The castle measures 30 by 14.3 metres (98 by 47 ft), with walls 1.5 metres (4.9 ft) thick, although the building is now a roofless shell. The north-east wing is of a later date, and the foundations of a south range are visible. Near the castle are the remains of a watchtower, 7 metres (23 ft) square, built on the cliff edge. Timothy Pont's map drawn c. 1580 – 1590 shows Dunskay Castle with 2 watchtowers on the cliff edge fronting the sea. Francis Grose's drawing dated show of 10 May 1790s the ruins of the foundations and sea-wall on the south, and what looks to be the large entrance door in the southern corner from where the inside staircase may have led straight up to the new "Hall" built c.1520. Grose's drawing shows Ireland (approx. Island Magee / Larne area) in the background across the sea.

In virtue of a tradition preserved in the Book of Leinster, W. J. Watson identifies the place named in it as Port Rig (Portrie, Portree) with the later Portpatrick, connecting 'Rig' with Reregonium, which he regards as the royal town of the Novantae and places in this region. He would thus carry Portpatrick's history back to the first century of our era, while he dates a rather later reference to about AD 250. Portpatrick was known as the port of Castle Dunskey.

Dunskey is undoubtedly romantic. It was a location for the 1951 film Kidnapped of Robert Louis Stevenson's novel, Double X: The Name of the Game (1992), as well as for the 1952 film Hunted.

The owner restricts public access to the castle.

== 13th and 14th centuries ==
In the 1290s, John Comyn, Earl of Buchan, had a licence from Edward I of England, reigned 1272–1307) to dig for lead in the Calf of Man (off the coast of the Isle of Man), to cover eight towers of the Cruggleton Castle / Crogiltoun Castle in Wigtownshire. Was Dunskey Castle built about this time ? and in 1291 the nearby Wigtown Castle was in the hands of the same Edward I who committed it to the charge of Walter de Currie or Cory / Corry / Coree (laird of Dunskey). King Edward I ultimately conferred Wigtown Castle (and Dunskey Castle ?) on John Balliol the Scottish King (reigned 1292-1296 after which Scotland was without a monarch for 10 years and Sir William Wallace fought the English in 1297, but was defeated at Falkirk in 1298).

By 10 October 1303 Walter de Corry was dead and his lands were taken into the King's hands (King Edward I of England).

On 28 August 1296 the Ragman Rolls for Wigtownshire had been compiled at Berwick-on-Tweed, which time and place King Edward I of England also convened a Parliament of those Scottish nobles summoned by him to attend at the border city. The Wigtownshire roll contained 26 names, and some who were later associated with Dunskey Castle were Thomas de KITHEHILT (Adair of Kinhilt / Kilhilt / Kilhelt); Fergus MakDowylt (MacDowell); Thomas MacUlagh (MacCullough / McCullagh); Andrew (McDowell) de Logan; Dougal MacDowly (MacDowell / McDowell); Gilbert de Hanneth (Hannay); William MacUlagh (MacCullough / McCullagh); Michel MacUlagh (MacCullough); Johan Seneschal (Stewart, from whom descended the Earls of Darnly and Lennox); Maria, Queen of Mann and the Isles.

c. 1326 "Index of Charters, &c. by King Robert I." King Robert I Robert the Bruce (born 1274 reigned 1306-1329 after the Interregnum 1296-1306). p. 27 "In the Roll of Robert the First, marked on the back with this mark, X. 1. Carta to Thomas Edzear (probably Adair) of the lands of Kildonan, in the Rynes, Wigtoun".

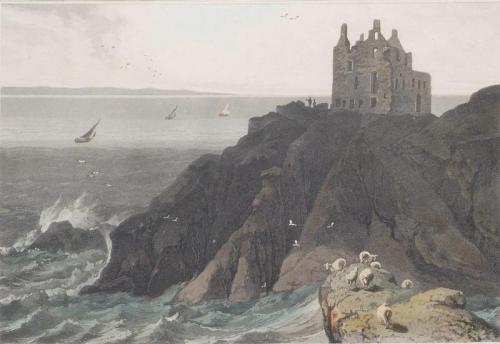
Dunsky Castle Near Patrick - painting by William Daniell

Another version of Adair / Odeir / Edzear of Dunskey Castle in Portry / Portrie / Port-N-Rye, is : c. AD1326 "Index A. From old vol. XXII Fol. 25 verso – Ane Littill small skine quahirin ar conteinet certane complaintis of deforcementis and of haldingis of landis quhilkis ar decydit be the parliament. Carta Thomas Odeir de terris de Kildonan Dromin Porthie" [ Portrie = Dunsky & Kinhilt ]. c.1600 Kildonan Castle appeared to be a large castle just east of Dunskey Castle, shown on Timothy Pont's map in Blaeu's Atlas.

== 15th & 16th centuries ==
On 10 November 1426 Nigello Adare de Portar (Portrie – Dunskey) was a witness to the restoration of the lands of Lochnaw Lochnaw Castle, by Willelmi de Douglas, dom. de Leswalt to Andree Agnew. This Nigello Adare may have died prior to 1456.

In 1456 Gilbert Kennedy, 1st Lord Kennedy of Dunure obtained the ward of Kynhilt (with Dunskey Castle) as shown in Exchequer Rolls of Scotland, Kennedy – Gilbert of DUNURE "OBTAINS ward of Kynhilt" (Dunskey) see 208 & 347. It is interesting that R.M.S. vol. II index on p. 1134 BALLIVUS de Carrick, lists p. 94 no.414, 13 February 1450 Gilbert Kennedy of Dunure "REX confirmavit Gilberto Kenedy de Dunure consang. suo, – quod ipse Gilbertus et heredes sui masculi essent caput totius progeniei sue tam in calumpniis quam in aliis articulis et negotiis ad KENKYNOLL pertinere valentibus; unaetum officio ballivi comitatus de Carric et hominum ipsius dectione et cum armorum ostensione in omnibus, sub comite de Carric qui pro tempore fuerit; – que idem Gilb. personaliter resignavit." iv. 182. – was he a bailie & Kenkynol, as Exchequer Roll 1455 shows Gilberti Kenedy, BALLIVI comitatus de carric had ward of Kylnnahelt (Dunskey).

Gilbert Kennedy of Dunure, bailie of Carrick, did not enjoy Dunskey Castle for long as in 1455, Exchequer Rolls of Scotland records that he was compensated for NOT having the ward of Adair. If he was the same Gilbert, he married Christian Adair and her son, apparently Rolland Adair, must have come of age about 1456. Christian Adair Kennedy was a widow and Dunskey apparently was resigned by Gilbert Kennedy then shown as of Quhiltis which may have been "White Hills" next to/or Kilhilt / Kinhilt, to William Earl of Douglas who in turn must have assigned it over to Rolland Adair when he came of age.

In 1457 the Exchequer Rolls, Vigtoun (Wigtownshire) listed "Libri Responsionum" notes that Rolandi Adair t. Gilhelt (Kilhelt) had sasine of Crecach, Dunnone, Pennyanach, Kildonan (Dunskey, o'wise Portree see p. 688), Carny, and Lochbeg (Laughbeg or Middle Laigh). Carny is shown on Pont's map as "Karn Multibrugh" north of Lefnol (Leffnoll / Lesnoll / Lochnoll) and as "Cairn" on Ainslie's 1782 map of the County of Wigton, in the National Library of Scotland, digital library early maps

In 1486 ADAIR (Adare), Rolland, deceased, father of William Adair (who must have been under-age) the ward of his lands of Kilhelt, Portre (Dunskey), Kildonane and Drummore, had been granted to an Alexander Bruce c.1468 who had had them in error for 18 years. p. 381 error of accounting for 18 years.

In 1488 William Adair of Dunskey Castle & Kinhilt and McCulloch of nearby Ardwell, Stoneykirk, were attacked by sheriff Quentin Agnew of Lochnaw Castle and his band of men. Agnew was pursued before the Lords of Council and in 1489 Agnew had to pay for the goods taken, but was entitled to a rebate if he returned them in good order.

About 1489 Dunskey / Dunsky Tower House [ otherwise Castle ] was partially burnt by Sir Alexander (Sandy) M'Culloch of Myrtoun Clan McCulloch. – 3 March 1499, pardon for McCulloch, along with respites for burning the Place of Dunskay granted to Duncane Makke, litil Gilbert Makke, Johne Clerk Makee & Andro Akersane.

In the early 1500s Dunskey Castle was repaired by the Adairs of Kinhilt (the Hall of Dunskey was rebuilt and was 36feet by 17feet). The Adairs built the Castle of St. John in nearby Stranraer Wigtownshire about 1510.

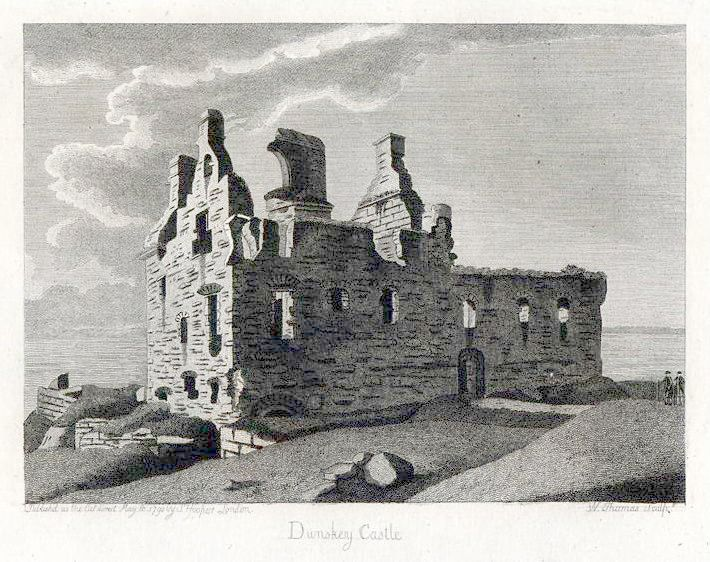
Dunskey Castle by Francis Grose 1790

29 August 1496 "Anent the complaynt made be Wilzeam Adaire of Kilhelt and Archibald Makculloch of Ardwell apoun Schir Alexander McCulloch of Mertoune, knicht Clan McCulloch, Owchtre McDowell of Gerthloy (Uchtred McDowell of Garthland) Clan Macdowall, and thare complicis, that quhair thai war dylatit of art and part of the slauchter of umquhile DYONYSE of Hammyltoun, quilkis was slane on Mydsummer evin that last was, in the toune of Wigtoun, thai bean innocent thareof, and was redy al tymes to underly our soverane Lordis lawis tharefore as was allegiit, quharefore the persons forsaid with thare complicis assegit the place of DUNSKAY pertenyng to the sade Wilzeam Adair and rasit fyre and byrnt the sammyn and skaithit the said Wilzeam in househald geire tharethrou, extending to the soume of xl li., throw the quhilk fyre rasing thai birnt ane box pertenyng to Elyse McCulloch quhilk thai had in keping and in it j li. and the skaith of the birnyng of the sade Wilzeam house extending to xx li., and als that thai tuke and spulzeit fra the sade Wilzeam foure horses with a part of barkit hydis, as was rychtsa allegiit, and als fra the sade Archbald McCulloch and his pure folkis insicht gudis of househald to the availe of xxx li., togidder with ix of ky and oxin, xviij of schepe, xvj horses and meris, tane be the sade Schir Alexander and his complicis as was inlikewise allegiit."

After September 1513 Ninian Adair of Kinhilt, as son and heir of William Adair who was killed at Flodden with McDowell, had Sasine (delivery of feudal property) of the estate. Four years later Ninian had a renewal of the tack which had been granted to his father in 1512. It is said that Ninian Adair rebuilt the castle of Dunskey on a more magnificent scale than ever, and to put an end to the feud with the MacDowells he espoused Janet McDowell, a daughter of the house of Garthland Garthland Castle. The ground floor plan of Dunskey appears to show this new enlarged section (three cellars facing the land-side of Dunskey Castle with the "new" hall with a huge fireplace on the next floor). The arched entrance appeared to be approximately at the south-eastern bottom corner room with circular steps leading up to the new hall. The archway to the entrance can be seen in Francis Grose's drawing, but only the top portion of the archway can now be seen. One peculiar aspect was that one of the new cellars or vaults appeared not to have had a door. Another aspect was "...we went by water to see the ruins of an old castle (Dunskey), under this house, in the rock, is a cave, which, they say, goes a considerable distance under ground...". This cave may be shown in a photo of Dunskey Castle on Geograph. There are other mentions of a piper "ghost" playing and pacing up and down perhaps in the cave.

In 1520–1521 Ninian Adair had only a short time to enjoy his new additions to Dunskey Castle as in 1523 his son William was mentioned as his heir. In 1520–1521 (as Ninian Adair's heir, William, was under-age) the warde his lands (including Dunskey castle) were put into the hands of the Gilbert Kennedy, 2nd Earl of Cassilis and Lord Maxwell.

== 17th century ==
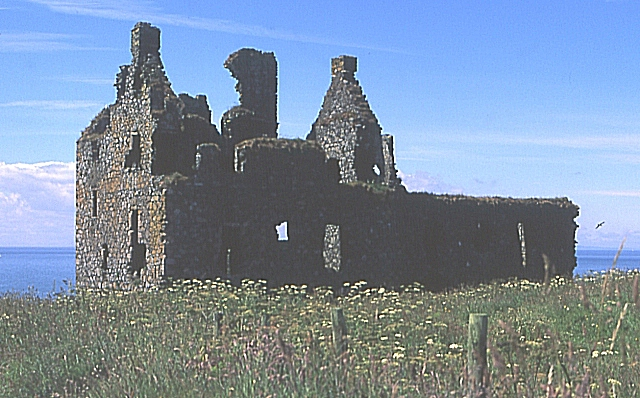
Dunskey Castle from the north-east. photo by Anne Burgess

c.1600 "in Ninian Adair's time and his sons" a browney "hanted" his house of Dunsky.

On 5 April 1608 the lands of Guilielmus (William) Adair heir of Niniani Adair de Kinhilt, included 10 lib. terranium de Portrie cum castro de Dunskey in parochie de Inche Inch, Wigtownshire. William Adair marriage contract 18 April 1580 to Rosina MacClellan of Galston whose brother, Sir Robert McClellan (McLellan) of MacLellan's Castle Kirkcudbright Clan MacLellan married 1614 Mary Montgomery, eldest daughter of Sir Hugh Montgomery, 1st Viscount Montgomery of Ards, county Down, Ireland.

In February 1620, "10 librat of antiqui extentus de Portry" including "3 mercatas de Marok cum castro de Doneskey" was acquired by Hugh Montgomery, 1st Viscount Montgomery who extended the castle by building the "Gallery" leading off from the "Hall" and vaults under the "Gallery".

On 24 August 1632 Sara Maxwell, Viscountess Montgomerie, wrote a letter to her husband, Hugh Montgomery, 1st Viscount Montgomery (Montgomerie of Airds) "It seameth ye ar causing your workmen goe on both in your building and theikine of your Gallerie att Dunskay. They ar necessarie thingis to be outride, seeing ye have put theme so far agait. Bot I am suire they ar greit chargeis vnto yow quhilk now can noght be helpeit; bot your lordship most compleit thame, as ye haue done many greater turne."

On 28 July 1646 Visc. Hugh Montgomery (Hugu Vicecomes De Airdis) of Ards, co Down, Ireland, was retoured heir to his father Hugh Montgomery, 2nd Viscount Montgomery, lands listed included castro de Dunskei.

On 15 June 1653 "Johne Shaw of Grenocke" was granted Dunskey by Andrew Wardlaw. The deed was a little unclear. "Joane Montgrumie alias Mackmath, relict of the "deceased" Hew Montgrumie sometime of Balharie in the Country of Doune, (Ireland), gentleman" "the 3 merk land of Marrock, with the castle, tower and fortalice of Dunskey situate thereupon" to which lands had pertained to Hew Montgomery now Viscount of Airds, his father (John Shaw's father-in-law?), and were apprised from him on 1 August 1650 at the instance of Joane Montgrumie alias Mackmath relict of the deceased Hew Montgrumie sometime of Balharie in the country of Doune, Gentleman (Balhenry ? co Down, Ireland), and of Maister Samuell Rutherfuird Samuel Rutherford professor of divinity in the University of Saint Andrews, now spouse of Joan Montgrumie alias Mackmath, for his interest, for payment of 2,000 pounds Scots.

AD1654 From Timothy Pont's map "Two castles stronger than the rest may be seen in the Rinns, Kennedy on Loch Isle of the Earl of Cassillis, and Scaeodunum (called in the vernacular Dunskey), (Scot dun / castle ? ) founded by the ancestors of Robert Adair on a sheer rock by the sea."

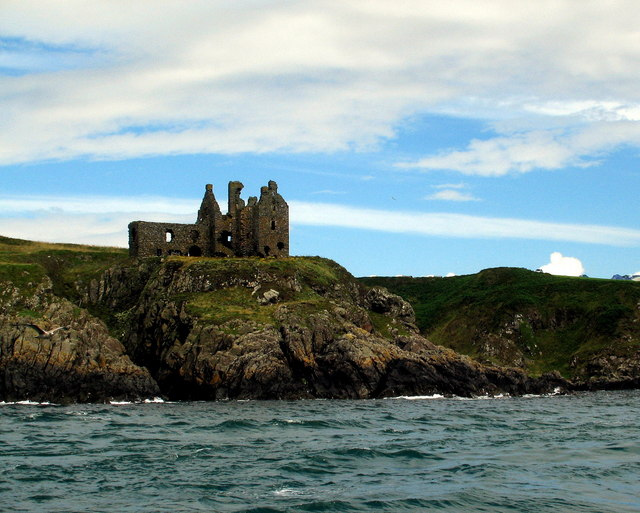
Dunskey Castle. photo by Joe McCartney

Viscount Montgomery was heavily in mortgage after sustaining his troops for a long period, (as was Sir Robert McLellan), so Dunskey Castle passed to the Blair family who were or had been Ministers at Portmontgomery als Portpatrick. Register of the Great Seal of Scotland, Vol. IX. AD1634-1651. p. 814 #2156 Apud Edinburgh, 10 January (1649) REX, – concessit et de novo dedit (KING Charles I – consents to a new deed ?) M. JACOBO BLAIR (Rev. James Blair) ministro Verbi Dei apud ecclesiam de Port-Montgomrie (minister of church at Port-Montgomery / Portpatrick Wigtownshire) ejus heredibus, successoribus et assignatis quibuscunque, irredimabiliter, – 4 mercatas terrarum de Meikle Portspittell, 3 mercatas de Litle Portspittell.

On 19 October 1667 there was a marriage contract between John Blair, (son of the minister of Portpatrick, Wigtownshire, Scotland) and Jean Agnew, dau of Patrick Agnew, Laird of Sheuchan. A witness was George Stewart of Tonderghie and of Barcly, Wigtownshire, who had married Elizabeth, daughter of James Blair of Dunskey Castle. George Stewart's sister, Agnes Stewart married William Houston of Cutreoch, Whithorn, Wigtownshire. Three other witnesses were James & Hew Blair, brothers of above John Blair, and Patrick Kennedy, Provost of Stranraer. Agnes Blair's (née Agnew) sister m. Alexander Adair, son of Robert Adair whose father, William Adair had previously owned Dunskey Castle. John Blair had acted as agent for Viscount Montgomery of Airds who had owned Dunskey Castle. The Viscount was in financial difficulties due to the upkeep of his troops, and had borrowed largely from his agent who foreclosed on a mortgage and became possessed of the whole of the Montgomery property in Galloway.

In AD 1657 John Blair of Dunskey, valuation 946 pounds 13sh 4p.. Valuations of the Shire of Wigtown, 1667.

On 11 September 1672 There was a ratification to John Blair of Dunskey and his wife Jean Agnew of their lands to be called "barony of Dunskey" and by 1684 the Laird of Dunskey and his wife had moved to nearby Killantringan, Portpatrick.

By 1684 Dunskey Castle was in ruin, only 50 years after Viscount Montgomery had added the new gallery wing extensions.
