= List of listed buildings in Portpatrick, Dumfries and Galloway =

This is a list of listed buildings in the civil parish of Portpatrick in Dumfries and Galloway, Scotland.

== List ==
Name	Location	Date Listed	Grid Ref. (Note: Sometimes known as OSGB36, the grid reference (where provided) is based on the British national grid reference system used by the Ordnance Survey. • "Guide to National Grid". Ordnance Survey. • "Get-a-map". Ordnance Survey.)	Geo-coordinates	Notes	LB Number (Note: Historic Environment Scotland assign a unique alphanumeric identifier to each designated site in Scotland, for listed buildings this always begins with "LB", for example "LB12345".)	Image
9 North Crescent, Crown Hotel				54°50′32″N 5°07′03″W	Category C(S)	45201	Upload Photo
Dunskey, Gatepiers, Gates and Boundary Walls to South Lodge				54°51′24″N 5°06′24″W	Category B	16757	Upload Photo
Portpatrick Harbour Including Outer and Inner Harbour with Lifting Crane, Lifeboat Shed and Warehouse, South Pier, Lighthouse, Lightkeeper's Cottage and Old Lighthouse Pottery				54°50′31″N 5°07′12″W	Category B	16776	Upload Photo
Dunskey Castle				54°50′08″N 5°06′35″W	Category A	16777	Upload Photo
51 Main Street, Anglesea including Boundary Walls				54°50′31″N 5°07′00″W	Category B	16746	Upload Photo
Dean Place, Mansewood including Boundary Walls, Railings and Gate				54°50′36″N 5°07′05″W	Category C(S)	45189	Upload Photo
1 Dinvin Street including Boundary Walls and Gatepiers				54°50′36″N 5°07′00″W	Category C(S)	45190	Upload Photo
Dunskey Gatepiers, Gates and Boundary Walls to North Lodge				54°51′48″N 5°06′29″W	Category C(S)	45193	Upload Photo
4-6A (Even Nos) Main Street				54°50′34″N 5°06′56″W	Category C(S)	16772	Upload Photo
21 And 23 Main Street, Gannochy and Burnbrae including Railings				54°50′36″N 5°06′55″W	Category C(S)	16719	Upload Photo
Dunskey, Gatepiers and Boundary Walls				54°51′08″N 5°07′04″W	Category C(S)	45192	Upload Photo
Portree Bridge				54°50′18″N 5°06′03″W	Category C(S)	45203	Upload Photo
29 Main Street, Ivy Cottage and Garden Flat including Boundary Walls and Railings				54°50′36″N 5°06′56″W	Category B	16771	Upload Photo
Dunskey, Dunskey House including Sundial				54°51′29″N 5°06′58″W	Category B	16749	Upload Photo
High Auchenree				54°52′52″N 5°06′06″W	Category C(S)	45196	Upload Photo
7 North Crescent including Boundary Walls				54°50′32″N 5°07′04″W	Category C(S)	45200	Upload Photo
21 South Crescent, Carlton House				54°50′29″N 5°06′59″W	Category C(S)	45206	Upload Photo
23 South Crescent, Erinview				54°50′30″N 5°06′59″W	Category C(S)	45207	Upload Photo
35 Main Street				54°50′34″N 5°06′57″W	Category B	16770	Upload Photo
8 Main Street, Cowanlea				54°50′33″N 5°06′56″W	Category C(S)	16773	Upload Photo
St Patrick Street, Inglenook including Boundary Walls and Gatepiers				54°50′34″N 5°06′59″W	Category B	16745	Upload Photo
Dunskey, Cable House				54°51′06″N 5°07′50″W	Category B	45191	Upload Photo
School Brae, Portpatrick Church Hall (former Free Church) including Boundary Walls, Railings and Gate				54°50′34″N 5°06′54″W	Category C(S)	45205	Upload Photo
Killantringan Lighthouse and Keeper's Cottage including Foghorn, Outbuildings, Boundary Walls and Gatepiers				54°51′43″N 5°08′49″W	Category B	16758	Upload Photo
Holm Street, Portpatrick Parish Church (Church of Scotland) including Boundary Walls, Gatepiers and Gates				54°50′41″N 5°06′51″W	Category B	16768	Upload Photo
Dunskey, Home Farm				54°51′14″N 5°06′30″W	Category B	16756	Upload Photo
Braefield Road, Braefield House including Boundary Walls and Railings				54°50′38″N 5°06′59″W	Category C(S)	45188	Upload Photo
Dunskey, South Lodge				54°51′24″N 5°06′24″W	Category C(S)	45195	Upload Photo
North Crescent, Harbourside and Craigview including Boundary Walls and Railings				54°50′33″N 5°07′06″W	Category C(S)	45199	Upload Photo
13 and 15 North Crescent, Lorac and Smugglers Cove, including Boundary Walls and Railings				54°50′31″N 5°07′02″W	Category C(S)	45202	Upload Photo
25 South Crescent, Ardbeg				54°50′30″N 5°06′59″W	Category C(S)	45208	Upload Photo
Dunskey, The Stables (formerly Dunskey Gardener's Cottages)				54°51′33″N 5°06′44″W	Category B	16721	Upload Photo
Dunskey, Kennels House and Kennels				54°51′19″N 5°06′41″W	Category C(S)	45194	Upload Photo
25 Main Street, Commercial Inn including Railings, Boundary Walls and Gates				54°50′36″N 5°06′55″W	Category B	16769	Upload Photo
Dunskey, Walled Garden and Greenhouses				54°51′34″N 5°06′49″W	Category B	16720	Upload Photo
10 and 12 Main Street, Downshire Arms Hotel				54°50′33″N 5°06′56″W	Category C(S)	16774	Upload Photo
Heugh Road, Portpatrick Hotel including Boundary Walls and Gatepiers				54°50′37″N 5°07′15″W	Category C(S)	16778	Upload Photo
St Patrick Street, Old Parish Church				54°50′34″N 5°07′00″W	Category A	16743	Upload Photo
St Patrick Street, Old Parish Church Graveyard, Boundary Walls and Gates				54°50′34″N 5°07′00″W	Category B	16744	Upload Photo
53 Main Street, Harbour House Hotel				54°50′31″N 5°07′01″W	Category C(S)	16747	Upload Photo
49 Main Street, Rockville including Boundary Walls				54°50′32″N 5°06′59″W	Category B	16748	Upload Photo

== Key ==
The scheme for classifying buildings in Scotland is:

- Category A: "buildings of national or international importance, either architectural or historic; or fine, little-altered examples of some particular period, style or building type."
- Category B: "buildings of regional or more than local importance; or major examples of some particular period, style or building type, which may have been altered."
- Category C: "buildings of local importance; lesser examples of any period, style, or building type, as originally constructed or moderately altered; and simple traditional buildings which group well with other listed buildings."

In March 2016 there were 47,288 listed buildings in Scotland. Of these, 8% were Category A, and 50% were Category B, with the remaining 42% being Category C.
