= Luce Bay =

Bay in Dumfries and Galloway, Scotland

- Scotland
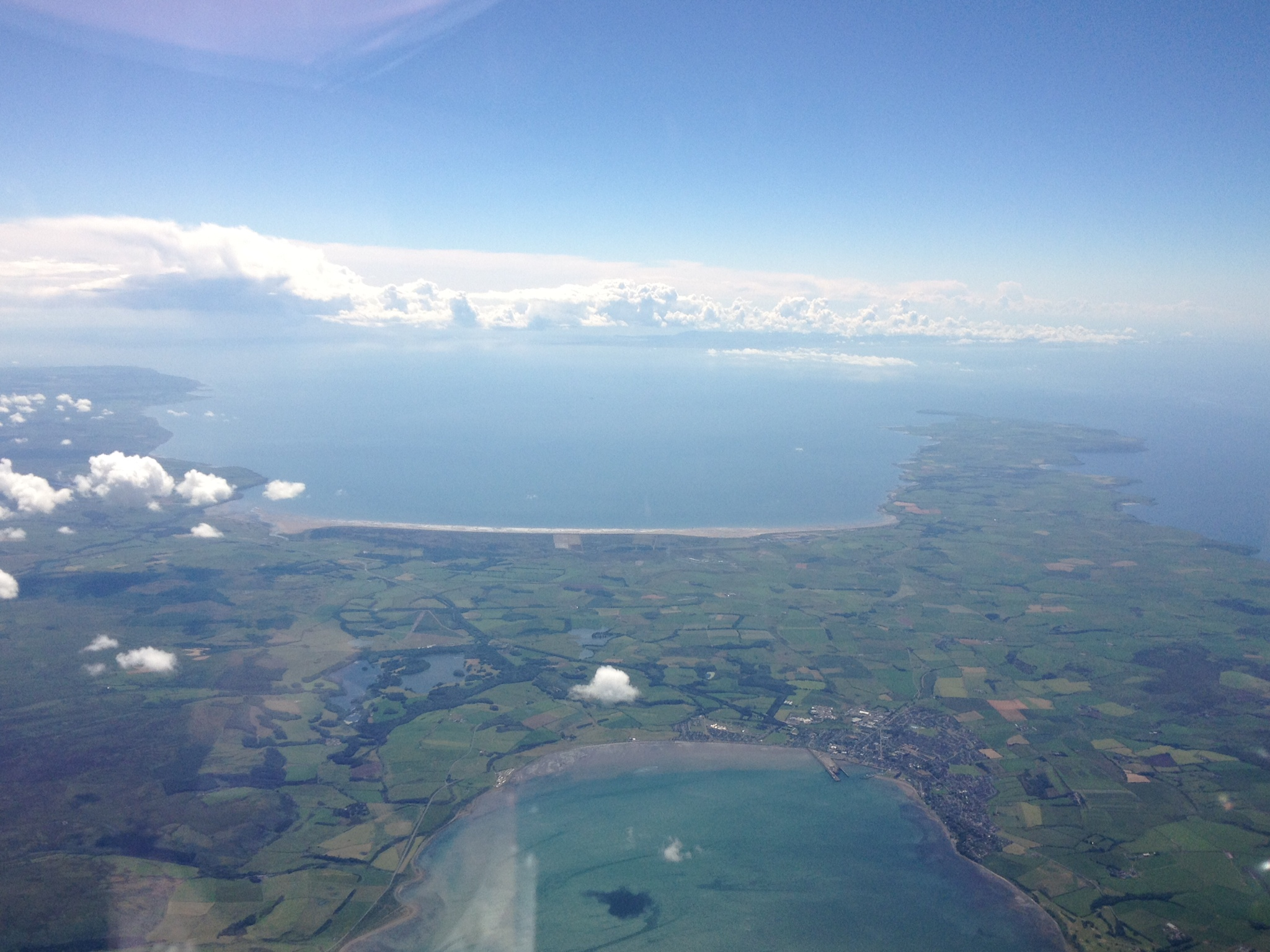
- Aerial view of Luce Bay. Looking across the eastern part of Loch Ryan and over Stranraer. In the distance can also be seen the Isle of Man

Site information
- Type: Missile Range
- Owner: QinetiQ
- Operator: Qinetiq
- Controlled by: Royal Air Force

Location
- Location of Luce Bay within Dumfries and Galloway Luce Bay (the United Kingdom)
- Coordinates: 54.845°N 4.8687°W

Site history
- Built: 1930

Airfield information
- Elevation: 2 metres (6 ft 7 in) AMSL

Luce Bay is a large bay in Wigtownshire in southern Scotland. The bay is 20 miles wide at its mouth and is bounded by the Rhins of Galloway to the west and the Machars to the east. The Scares are rocky islets at the mouth of the bay.

== Bombing range ==
From the 1930s to the 1990s, it was a bombing range used for training purposes by RAF aircraft (and later allied aircraft on a leasing basis) based at West Freugh. Discharged bombs were retrieved by a retired minesweeper based at Drummore. It is still a licensed Ministry of Defence range with byelaws restricting access during test and evaluation activities conducted by QinetiQ on behalf of the MOD.

Once an important commercial fishery, Luce Bay is now seldom used for this purpose. It contains important marine and littoral life, and has been declared a Special Area of Conservation by Scottish Natural Heritage

== Places on Luce Bay coastline ==
- Ardwell, Auchenmalg
- Chappel Rossan
- Drummore
- Glenluce
- River Luce
- Maryport, Mull of Galloway
- Monreith
- Port William
- Sandhead
- Terrally Bay, Torrs Warren

== See also ==
- Deep Sea Range on the Outer Hebrides
- RAF Tain on the Moray Firth
