= List of listed buildings in Stoneykirk, Dumfries and Galloway =

This is a list of listed buildings in the civil parish of Stoneykirk, in Dumfries and Galloway, Scotland.

== List ==
Name	Location	Date Listed	Grid Ref. (Note: Sometimes known as OSGB36, the grid reference (where provided) is based on the British national grid reference system used by the Ordnance Survey. • "Guide to National Grid". Ordnance Survey. • "Get-a-map". Ordnance Survey.)	Geo-coordinates	Notes	LB Number (Note: Historic Environment Scotland assign a unique alphanumeric identifier to each designated site in Scotland, for listed buildings this always begins with "LB", for example "LB12345".)	Image
Kildrochet House Including Gates And Gatepiers				54°51′53″N 4°59′34″W	Category B	16712	Upload Photo
Windmill Plantation, Old Windmill				54°49′42″N 4°58′05″W	Category B	16731	Upload Photo
Clachanmore Gallery, Former School And Schoolhouse, Including Boundary Walls, Gatepiers, Gates And Ancillary Structures				54°46′43″N 4°58′54″W	Category C(S)	16738	Upload Photo
Ardwell, Ardwell House, Walled Garden Including Gardener's Cottage And Owl Statue				54°46′00″N 4°57′06″W	Category C(S)	46697	Upload Photo
Ardwell, Bowling Hall, Ivy And Shore Cottages Including Boundary Walls And Gates				54°46′14″N 4°56′27″W	Category C(S)	46698	Upload Photo
Stoneykirk Parish Church Graveyard Including Boundary Walls, Gatepiers And Gates				54°50′14″N 4°58′39″W	Category B	16729	Upload Photo
Kirkmabreck Farmhouse Including Farmhouse, Cottage, Steading, Boundary Walls And Gate				54°47′28″N 4°57′30″W	Category B	16732	Upload Photo
Drumbreddan Including Walled Garden, Steading, Farm Cottage, Boundary Walls And Gatepiers				54°45′17″N 4°58′39″W	Category B	16737	Upload Photo
Balgreggan, Walled Garden To Former Balgreggan House				54°48′34″N 4°58′21″W	Category C(S)	46699	Upload Photo
Balgreggan, Kennels And Barn To Former Balgreggan House, Including Boundary Walls And Gatepiers				54°48′36″N 4°58′36″W	Category C(S)	46700	Upload Photo
Ringuinea Moss				54°47′06″N 4°59′30″W	Category C(S)	46704	Upload Photo
Garthland Mains Including Farmhouse, Steading, Farm Cottage, Bridge, Tower, Boundary Walls And Gatepiers				54°51′25″N 4°59′53″W	Category B	16714	Upload Photo
Mains Of Caldons Farmhouse				54°50′29″N 4°59′21″W	Category C(S)	46703	Upload Photo
Ardwell, Ardwell Mains				54°46′15″N 4°57′04″W	Category C(S)	16735	Upload Photo
Ardwell, Ardwell House, East Lodge Including Boundary Walls, Gatepiers And Gate				54°46′25″N 4°56′29″W	Category C(S)	46696	Upload Photo
Ardwell, Ardwell House Including Lamp Standards, Gatepiers, Gate, Sundial And Owl Statue				54°46′07″N 4°57′06″W	Category B	16733	Upload Photo
Ardwell, Ardwell Church (Church Of Scotland) Including Boundary Walls, Gatepiers And Gates				54°46′12″N 4°57′16″W	Category B	16734	Upload Photo
Cairnhandy Farmhouse, Steading And Cottage, Including Boundary Walls				54°45′59″N 4°57′58″W	Category C(S)	16736	Upload Photo
Ardwell, Ardwell House, Boundary Walls, Gates And Gatepiers				54°46′11″N 4°57′01″W	Category C(S)	46695	Upload Photo
Lake Cottage Including Boundary Walls, Gatepiers And Outhouse				54°47′48″N 4°57′43″W	Category C(S)	46702	Upload Photo
Gruesey, Former United Free Manse, Including Boundary Walls And Gatepiers				54°47′50″N 4°57′44″W	Category B	16717	Upload Photo
Ardwell, Ardwell Mill				54°47′45″N 4°57′17″W	Category C(S)	16718	Upload Photo
East Cairnwell Including Farmhouse, Steading, Boundary Walls, Gates And Gatepiers				54°47′52″N 4°58′10″W	Category C(S)	46701	Upload Photo
Stoneykirk Parish Church (Church Of Scotland) And Railings				54°50′14″N 4°58′37″W	Category B	16728	Upload Photo
Kirkmadrine Church Including Graveyard, Mctaggart Memorial, Boundary Walls, Gatepiers And Gates				54°47′37″N 4°59′16″W	Category A	16739	Upload another image See more images

== Key ==
The scheme for classifying buildings in Scotland is:

- Category A: "buildings of national or international importance, either architectural or historic; or fine, little-altered examples of some particular period, style or building type."
- Category B: "buildings of regional or more than local importance; or major examples of some particular period, style or building type, which may have been altered."
- Category C: "buildings of local importance; lesser examples of any period, style, or building type, as originally constructed or moderately altered; and simple traditional buildings which group well with other listed buildings."

In March 2016 there were 47,288 listed buildings in Scotland. Of these, 8% were Category A, and 50% were Category B, with the remaining 42% being Category C.
