= Ardwell =

Coordinates: 54.771°N 4.941°W

Ardwell: Scottish Gaelic: Àrd Bhaile
- Location within Dumfries and Galloway
- Population: 123 (2001 Census)
- Council area: Dumfries and Galloway
- Lieutenancy area: Wigtown
- Country: Scotland
- Sovereign state: United Kingdom
- Post town: Stranraer
- Postcode district: DG9
- Dialling code: 01776-860
- Police: Scotland
- Fire: Scottish
- Ambulance: Scottish
- UK Parliament: Dumfries and Galloway
- Scottish Parliament: Galloway and West Dumfries

Ardwell (from Gaelic Àrd Bhaile meaning "high town", pronounced as "Ardwell") is a village in the Scottish unitary council area of Dumfries and Galloway. It lies on the shores of Luce Bay in the southern part of the Rhins of Galloway. The A716 road to Drummore or the Mull of Galloway passes through the village. The only other street is Ardwell Park, a street of new houses.

The community is served by the nearby Ardwell Church, a small public church with a bell tower, built in 1900–1902.

Many of the houses are still owned by Ardwell Estates, and Ardwell House is located around 800 metres (0.5 mi) west of the village in the grounds of Ardwell Garden and looking across Ardwell Pond.

In the grounds of Ardwell House, on a ridge above the road, are the remains of a medieval motte; the castle bailey may have stood to the north. In addition, south of the church are the ruins of Killaser Castle, the ancestral home of the McCullochs, who formerly held Ardwell., Stoneykirk, Rhinns, Wigtownshire.

Near High Ardwell, on the other side of the peninsula, are the remains of Doon Castle, the best example of an Iron Age broch in Dumfries and Galloway.

Ardwell used to hold the Leek Fair, where plants were sold.

== Ardwell Gardens ==
Ardwell Gardens is a 342 ha (970 acres) garden surrounding the 18th-century Ardwell House. It has a walled garden, and a large pond which has ducks and swans with an approximately half-hour walk round it. There is also access to Ardwell church (to the west) and Ardwell village (to the east) with a beach and boat shop.

== Logan Botanic Garden ==
Logan Botanic Garden, a branch of the Royal Botanic Garden Edinburgh, is 2.5 miles (4.0 km) by road from Ardwell. Logan's mild climate allows a variety of exotic plants to grow outdoors. There are many beautiful plants which can be found in few other gardens in Britain. It has a woodland garden, and a walled garden and a terrace garden with an avenue of Chusan palms.

== Gallery ==
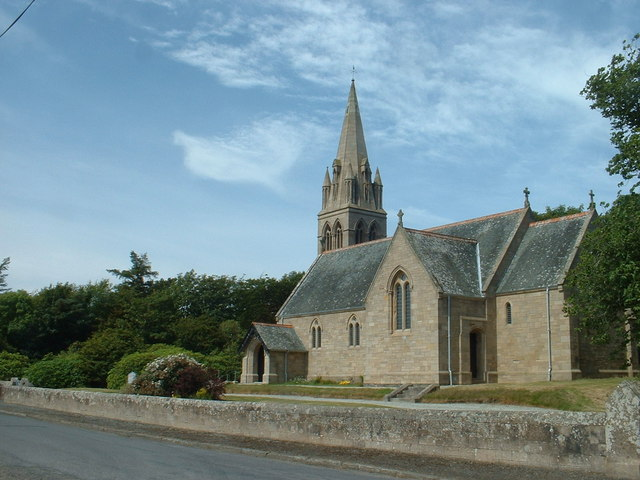
Ardwell Church

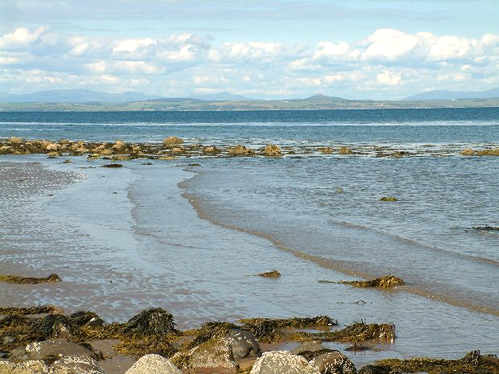
Ardwell beach

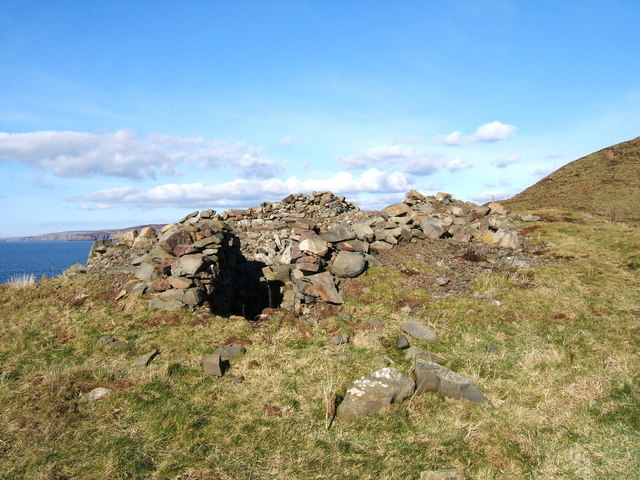
Doon Castle
