= Portpatrick =

Village in Dumfries and Galloway, Scotland

Coordinates: 54.84504°N 5.12429°W

Portpatrick: Scottish Gaelic: Port Phàdraig; Scots: Portpaitrick
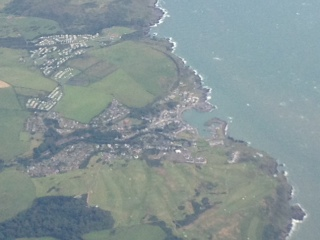
- Aerial view of Portpatrick.

- Location within Dumfries and Galloway
- Population: 600 (2020)
- OS grid reference: NW995545
  - Edinburgh: 108 mi (174 km)
  - London: 309 mi (497 km)
- Civil parish: Portpatrick
- Council area: Dumfries and Galloway
- Lieutenancy area: Wigtownshire
- Country: Scotland
- Sovereign state: United Kingdom
- Post town: Stranraer
- Postcode district: DG9
- Dialling code: 01776
- Police: Scotland
- Fire: Scottish
- Ambulance: Scottish
- UK Parliament: Dumfries and Galloway
- Scottish Parliament: Galloway and West Dumfries

Portpatrick is a village and civil parish in the historical county of Wigtownshire, Dumfries and Galloway, Scotland. It is located on the west coast of the Rhins of Galloway. The parish is about 4 1/2 miles (7 km) in length and 4 miles (6 km) in breadth, covering 9,300 acres (3,800 ha).

== History ==
Dating back some 700 years and built adjacent to the ruins of nearby Dunskey Castle, Portpatrick's position on the Rhins of Galloway affords visitors views of the Northern Irish coast 21 miles (34 km) to the west, with cliff-top walks and beaches both north and south. The Gulf Stream, flowing in from the north, gives the coastline a pleasant climate, in which subtropical plant life can flourish.

Portpatrick has a Community Council, and an annual Life Boat Week, featuring parades, activities, and a firework display. There are bowls clubs, a golf club, many guesthouses and hotels, and rustic public houses. The village is also home to a mini putting course.

By the inner harbour is the starting point of the Southern Upland Way, a long-distance walking route to Cockburnspath on the east coast. The Portpatrick Hotel, built in 1905 and extended in 1907, sits on the cliffs above this point.

The village was used as one of the locations for the 1952 film Hunted, starring Dirk Bogarde and directed by Charles Crichton. It also featured in the BBC drama Two Thousand Acres of Sky as a stand-in for Portree.

== Features ==
=== Harbour ===
Portpatrick Harbour

Portpatrick village was founded on fishing, operating from the sandy, crescent-shaped harbour that remains the focal point of the village. It was the principal port for goods and mail traffic to Ireland from the 17th century, but the strong winds across the North Channel made this impractical. In 1770 John Smeaton constructed the town's first proper harbour. In 1821, John Rennie was appointed to create a new harbour defined by two new piers. The north pier collapsed in 1839, but the south remains standing. The harbour's inner basin was built between 1861 and 1863, but by then, the main goods route to Ireland was via Stranraer, and services went into decline.

=== St Patrick's Church ===
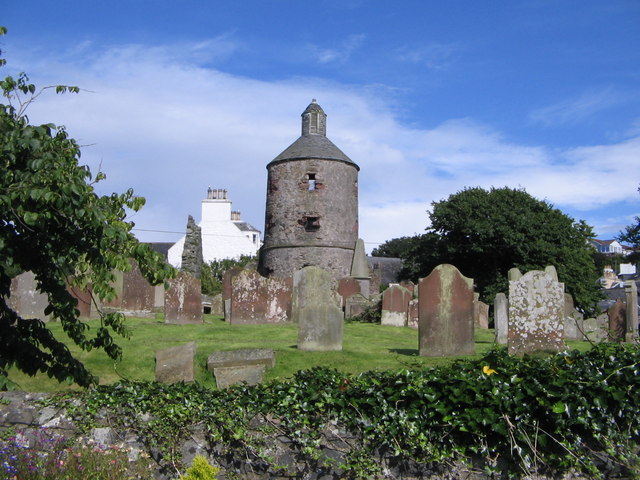
Portpatrick Old Kirk

This ruined church, dating from 1629, may itself stand on the ruins of an earlier church, known as St Patrick's Chapel. The circular tower may date from the 1520s, and originally stood on its own. Its unusual shape (for Scotland) may mean that it was either a lighthouse for the harbour, or heavily influenced by Irish architecture.

In the 18th and 19th centuries, when Portpatrick was an important ferry port for passengers, postal mail and freight between Ireland and Scotland, the village was described as the Gretna Green for Ireland. There was a daily packet boat from Donaghadee, and marriages for couples from Ireland were conducted by the Church of Scotland minister in Portpatrick, although according to Brack (1997) he often overlooked the rules about the publication of banns or the required period of residence. It's believed that happy couples could disembark, complete the ceremony, and be back on board within an hour.

The graveyard around the church contains memorials to many victims of shipwrecks in nearby waters. Joined to the original chapel was a district by the name of the Black Quarter of Inch. When the church was rebuilt in 1629, the Black Quarter was disjoined from Inch and erected as the Parish of Montgomorie. The name of the parish however was changed after only two or three years to that of Portpatrick.

=== Railway ===
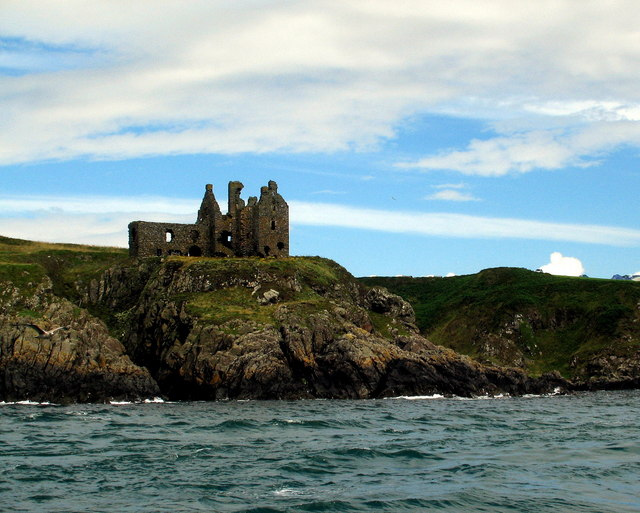
Dunskey Castle

Portpatrick railway station was completed in 1861. It was the original terminus of the Portpatrick Railway, in order to serve new steam packet services across the North Channel. After a new harbour was built in Stranraer, Portpatrick declined again as a cross-channel port, and the station closed on 6 February 1950. Portpatrick would likely be the eastern terminus of the proposed road and rail Irish Sea Bridge.

=== Dunskey Castle ===
1/2 mile (800 m) south of the village is Dunskey Castle, reached via a steep trail incorporating steps and a narrow bridge. The site has seen at least two castles, though the present ruins date from the 16th century.

=== Cairn Pat (Cairnpot) Hill Fort or settlement ===
A large fort or walled settlement enclosed an area of 1.2 hectares (3.0 acres), about 137 by 125 metres (449 ft × 410 ft), within two walls, covered on the west by two ramparts set about 5.5 metres (18 ft) and 9.5 metres (31 ft) apart, with external ditches. A third rampart 2.1 metres (6 ft 11 in) thick by 0.3 metres (1 ft 0 in) high was on the southern approach, outside of which was a low bank about 1.5 metres (4 ft 11 in) wide. On the west-north-west arc of the second wall there was an entrance gap about 1.2 metres (3 ft 11 in) wide. On the north a 2.1-metre (6 ft 11 in) road passed diagonally through the defences from the north-west. From the south-east a natural hollow ran out from the fort, flanked on the west by a face of outcropping rock. At the head of it on the west side within the inner rampart were foundations of a small circular structure measuring internally about 2.1 metres (6 ft 11 in) and overall 3.7 metres (12 ft).

== Portpatrick Navtex transmissions ==
Portpatrick is the base from which Navtex transmissions for the seas North and West of the UK are broadcast. For the purpose of extended Shipping forecasts, the Met Office uses Portpatrick as the name of the forecast area covering the sea between South-East Iceland and Lundy, including the waters around Ireland

== See also ==
- List of listed buildings in Portpatrick, Dumfries and Galloway
