= Rhins of Galloway =

Peninsula in Scotland

Coordinates: 54.86°N 5.049°W

- Peninsula
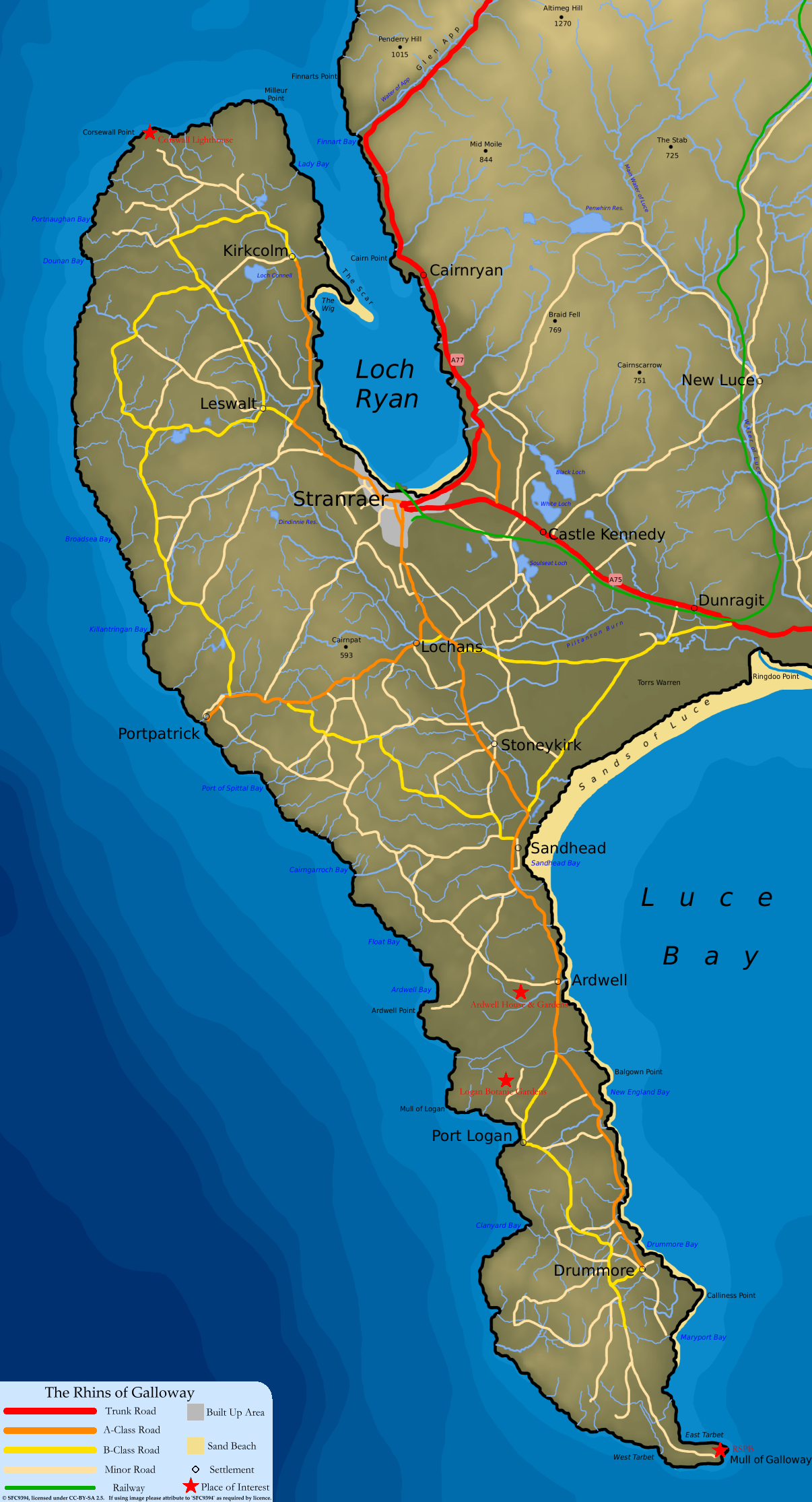
- A map of the Rhins

- Location within Scotland
- Location: Wigtownshire, Dumfries & Galloway
- Highest elevation: 182 m (597 ft) (Cairn Pat)
- Northern extremity: Milleur Point
- Southern extermity: Mull of Galloway

The Rhins (or Rhinns) of Galloway is a double-headed peninsula in southwestern Scotland. It takes the form of a hammerhead projecting into the Irish Sea, terminating in the north at Corsewall and Milleur Points and in the south at the Mull of Galloway (the southernmost point of Scotland). It is connected to the rest of Wigtownshire by an isthmus, washed on the north by Loch Ryan and on the south by Luce Bay. From end to end, the peninsula measures 28 miles (45 kilometres). It takes its name from the Gaelic word rinn, meaning "point".

The principal settlements are Stranraer at the head of Loch Ryan and the small tourist village of Portpatrick on the west coast. Other villages are dotted up and down the peninsula, including Kirkcolm, Leswalt, Lochans, and, in the South Rhins, Stoneykirk, Sandhead, Ardwell, and Drummore.

== Geography and climate ==
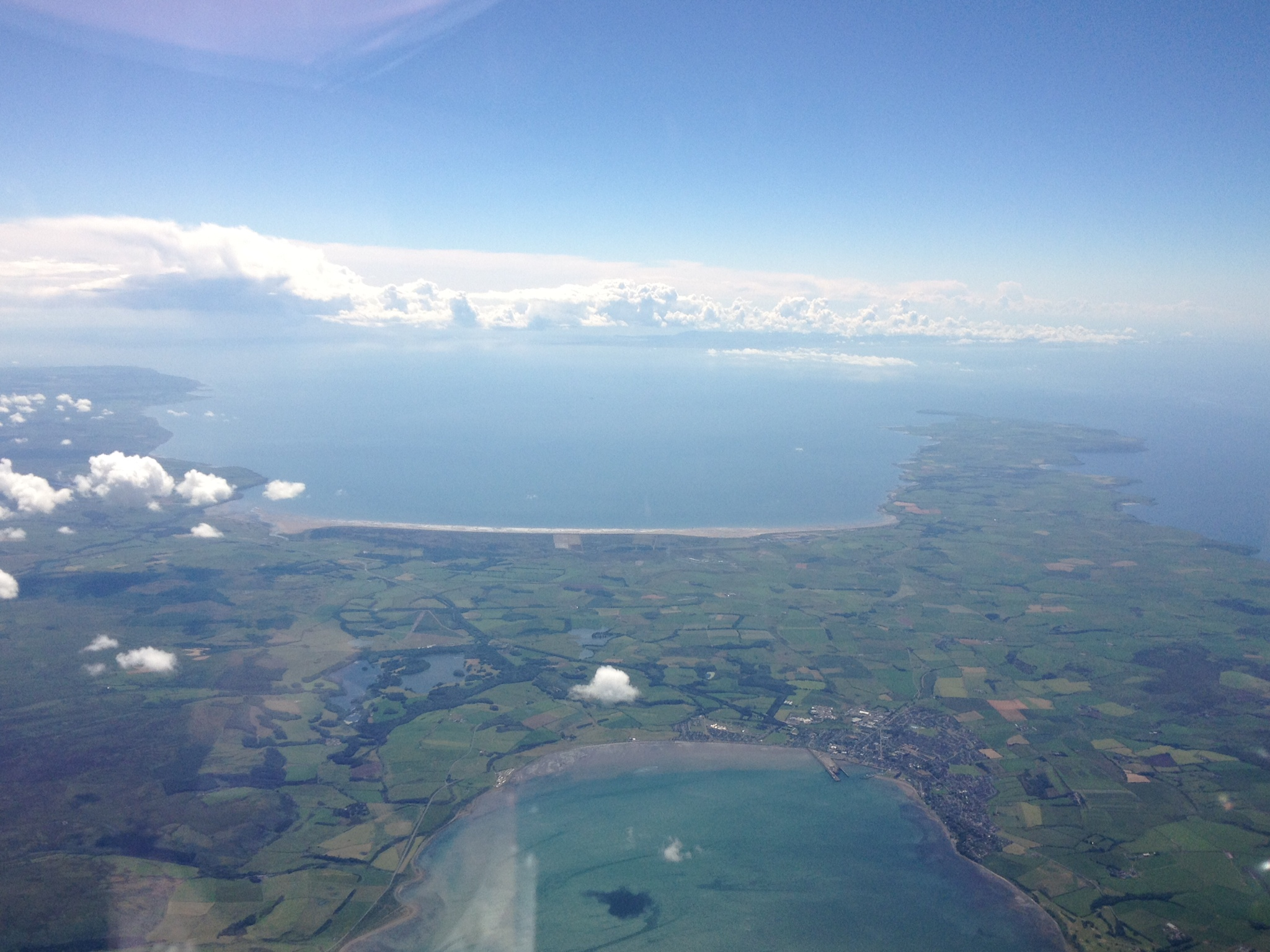
A view of Luce Bay, displaying the isthmus

The peninsula is bounded on its west coast by the North Channel and Loch Ryan and Luce Bay in the east. With around 50 miles (80 km) of coastline running from Stranraer in the north to Torrs Warren in the south, the sea heavily influences the land. The coastal landscape varies: the west coast has steep, rugged cliffs and occasional inlets, but the calmer eastern coast has sandy beaches and a softer landscape.

The Rhins are exposed to the westerlies from the Atlantic and thus receive a lot of rainfall (around 1,000 millimetres or 40 inches per year); this has led to the peninsula being principally used for farming, with the relatively flat land offering good dairy and beef production. As the land is almost surrounded by sea, its temperature is significantly stabilised by the North Atlantic drift, which cools the land in summer and warms it in winter. Thus there are few severe frosts. This allows the survival of numerous tropical palms and flora which otherwise could not exist this far north. Examples of these tropical plants can be seen at the Logan Botanic Garden.

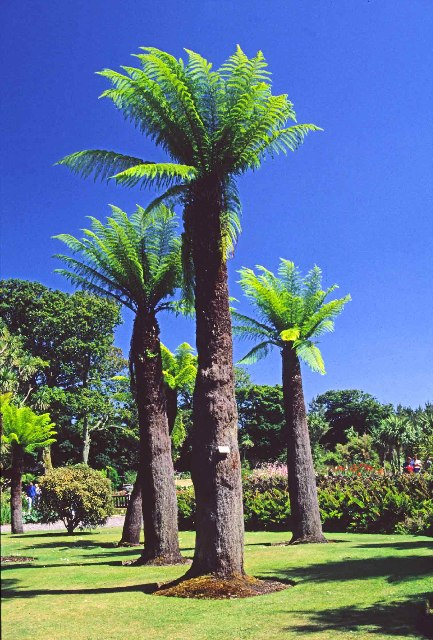
Tree Ferns at Logan Botanic Gardens give a tropical feel to the area

The natural geography of the Rhins has led directly to the use of the area for development: the entire peninsula acts as a huge breakwater against the currents of the North Channel and, to a lesser extent, the Atlantic. This creates relatively calm and safe navigable waters in Loch Ryan and Luce Bay. They are notably used by the ferries that sail to Belfast and Larne, which were originally based at Portpatrick. As the ships became larger, they required larger protective harbours, and the exposed Portpatrick was no longer suitable, so they moved to the shelter of Loch Ryan from where they still sail today.

The southernmost point of the Rhins is also the southernmost point in Scotland, the Mull of Galloway. Here the land and rocky cliffs support a diverse range of animals and plants, with the Mull area designated a Site of Special Scientific Interest and also an RSPB nature reserve. Razorbills, guillemots, and puffins are three bird species that nest on the cliffs.

The land narrows significantly north of the Mull, south of Rhins, forming an isthmus dividing two bays (the East and West Tarbets). In ancient times boats were brought ashore and moved across the isthmus by human resources, with the aid of log rollers and lubrication—all this effort aimed to avoid navigating around the Mull with its dangerous currents.

The Southern Upland Way begins in the Rhins at Portpatrick and winds its way through the area on its long journey east across Scotland to its finish at Cockburnspath.

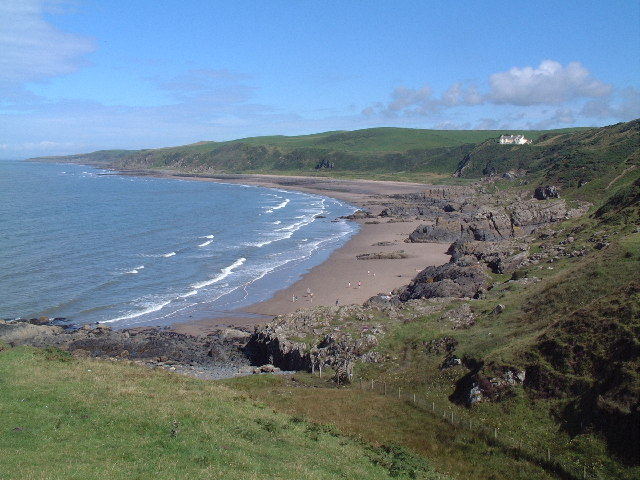
Killantringan Bay near Portpatrick

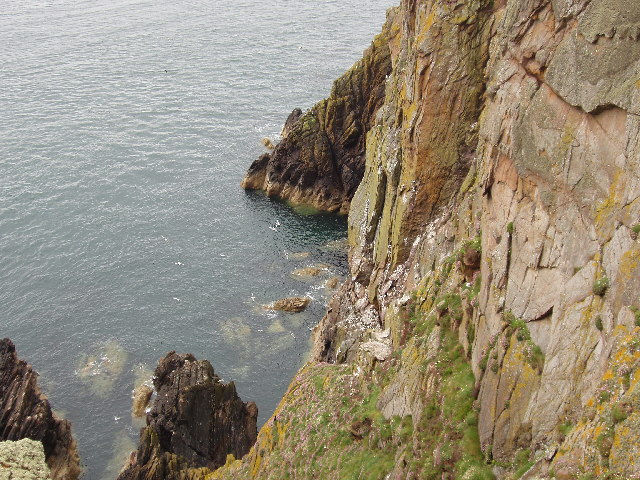
Cliffs at the Mull of Galloway

== History and settlements ==
In the South Rhins the Britons were commemorated by the name of a farm, Drumbreddan, "the ridge of the Britons". Their chieftains lived in hill-forts, like that of Dunman, "fort of gables", Kirkmaiden, 400 feet (120 metres) above sea level; some in drystone brochs, like Doon Castle at Ardwell Point. They built substantial fortifications, like the one between East and West Tarbet, which defends the Mull of Galloway against marauders from the north.

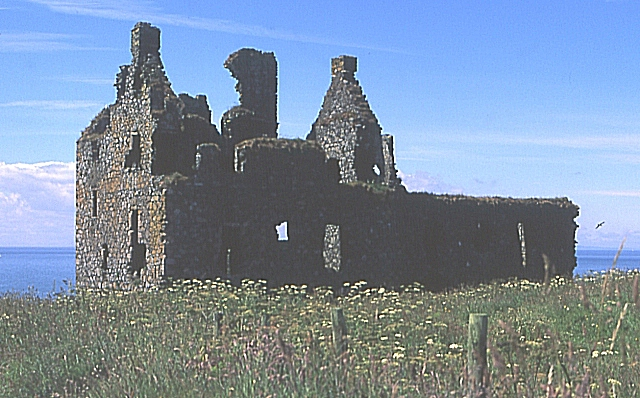
The remains of Dunskey Castle near Portpatrick

Having been settled from ancient times, the area has a long history, forming part of the western kingdoms that collectively ruled most of western Scotland, parts of Ireland and the Isle of Man. The Novantae Celtic tribe was based in the Rhins area, which the Romans called Novantarum Peninsula. When Agricola was in Britain in 81 AD, a road was built from Dalswinton west to the Rhins, terminating at Stranraer on the southwestern tip of Loch Ryan, leading some to argue that if Agricola did attack Ireland, he would have done so from this location.

Subsistence lifestyles such as crofting are likely to have been dominant throughout much of the peninsula's history. Farming would have been practised to satisfy the needs of the tenants and, later on, the estates. Fishing would have generally been practised on a local scale for local consumption rather than export. Due to the very sparse populations that lived in the area it was not until the Industrial Revolution that changes from a basic subsistence crofting lifestyle would be noted.

Resources in the area were traditionally used locally and increasingly exported. Salt Pans on the western coast of the peninsula were used for centuries as a local source of salt. Kelp harvesting became increasingly popular, both for local uses and also exported for use in chemical production. Sands, silts and gravels, common to all glaciated alluvial areas were frequently quarried.

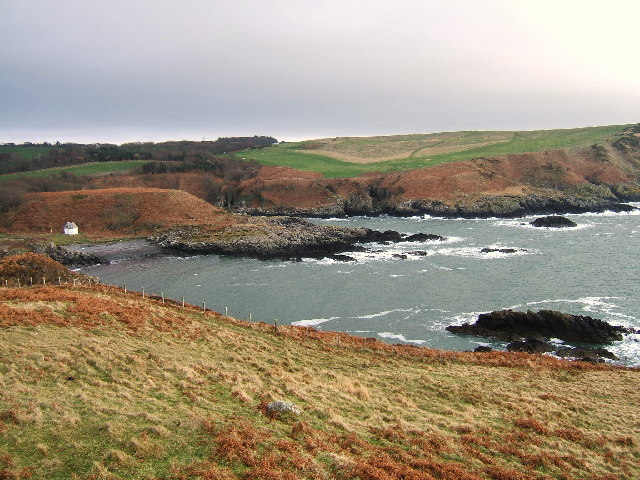
Port Kale and Port Mora Bays, near Portpatrick

As communications improved the wealth of the area improved, with the sea links to Ireland, Glasgow and Liverpool both allowing the export of local farming produce (thus encouraging farming for production rather than subsistence) and also import of materials and goods not common to the area. The importance of the area's proximity to Ireland led to significant infrastructure being developed, most notably the link to the railway network, which was laid to Portpatrick to ensure a fast passage for the mail boat to Donaghadee. As the ships which served the North Channel route increased in size it became more difficult for Portpatrick to offer a safe harbour, with the shipping routes eventually moving in 1849 to the calmer waters of Stranraer Harbour in Loch Ryan.

During the Second World War the area became an important station for anti-U-boat activities, with flying boats operating from the Loch side of the peninsula at RAF Station Wig Bay, as well as RAF Station Stranraer. RAF Corsewall operated north of Kirkcolm and was mainly used as a training school for flying boats. The bombing range in Luce Bay was used extensively throughout the second world war, with facilities based at West Freugh and Drummore

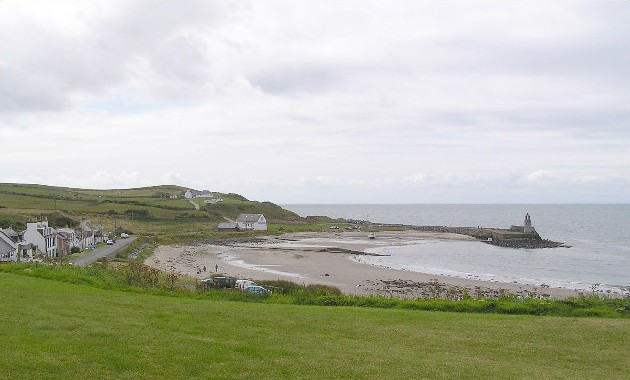
Port Logan, the location used for BBC drama Two Thousand Acres of Sky

In modern times the peninsula consists of a patchwork of farms running the full length of the land. Increasingly the area is diversifying into tourism as small scale farming becomes less economically viable. The natural environment of the area, with its long rugged coastline and numerous small bays attracts some tourism, though a small fraction of that in the rest of Scotland. The natural environment of the area saw the BBC deciding to film the drama Two Thousand Acres of Sky in the village of Port Logan.

In 2025, Dumfries and Galloway Council established the Rhins of Galloway Coast Path , which will be designated one of Scotland's Great Trails.

Sites of interest in and around the Rhins include:

- Corsewall Lighthouse, sitting at the northern end of the peninsula, it is now a four star hotel
- Lochnaw Castle near Leswalt which is the ancestral seat of Clan Agnew
- West Freugh RAF station near Stoneykirk which was (and to a lesser extent still is) used by the RAF as an airfield for bombing target practice out in Luce Bay
- Dunskey Castle near Portpatrick, built in the 16th century by the Adairs of Kilhilt, with now only the remains remaining
- Port Logan village, where the BBC drama Two Thousand Acres of Sky was filmed, and the nearby Logan outstation of the Royal Botanic Garden, Edinburgh.
- Ardwell House & Gardens near Ardwell, the estate house and gardens of Ardwell estates
- Kirkmadrine Stones near Sandhead, earliest Christian activity on the peninsula, with the site established in the 5th century.
- The Mull of Galloway, lighthouse and RSPB nature reserve

== See also ==
- Kingdom of the Rhinns
- Stranraer railway station
