= Doon Castle Broch =

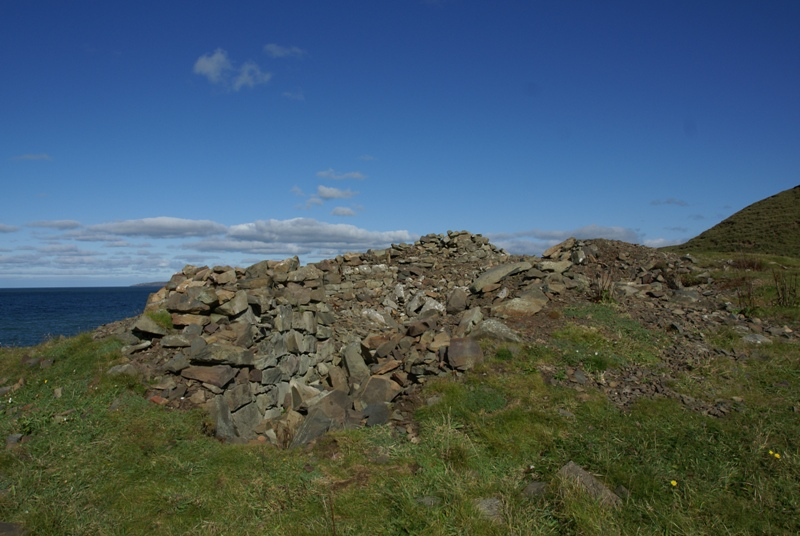
- Doon Castle Broch

- Doon Castle Broch, Scotland
- 54.759777°N 5.005741°W
- Type: Broch
- Periods: Iron Age
- Location: Dumfries and Galloway

Scheduled monument
- Designated: 24 October 1924
- Reference no.: SM1970

Doon Castle Broch is an iron-age broch located in Dumfries and Galloway, Scotland (grid reference NX 06702 44683).

== Location ==
The Broch is located on the Rhins of Galloway in Dumfries and Galloway.

== History ==
The broch was first recorded by archaeologists in 1912 by RCAHMS in their 'Fourth Report and Inventory of Monuments and Constructions in Galloway'. It has since been mentioned in several other publications but has yet to have been excavated.

== Description ==
Doon Castle broch is located on the south side of Ardwell Point, which projects out into the North Channel. An early description mentions that the broch is separated from the main land by a wall and natural gully (6 meters across and 2.3 meters deep) crossed by a man-made causeway (1.9 meters wide and 0.9 meters high).

The remains of the broch are reasonably preserved, showing that the structure is 9 meters in diameter with walls 3–4 meters in thickness. On the northeast side the wall is preserved up to 1.8 meters in height. This broch had two entrances; one on the north-northeast side (which is blocked by fallen stones) and a second in the south side. These two entrances coincide with land and sea approaches. There is a chamber to the east, with a possible second chamber to the west. The extant remains of the chamber to the east consist of the sides of the entrance (measuring 0.8 meters at the mouth to 1.2 meters closer to the inner wall face). There is far less known about the possible west chamber.

Between Doon Castle broch and the northern end of the point there are further archaeological remains, including a wall approximately 2.6 meters thick. This wall appears to enclose an area 14 meters (E-W) by 10 meters (N-S). This outer structure was likely entered in the north-northeast wall, which is situated opposite the manmade causeway.

== Archaeological Finds ==
Doon Castle Broch has not been excavated, with survey only revealing rubble in the interior.

== Images ==
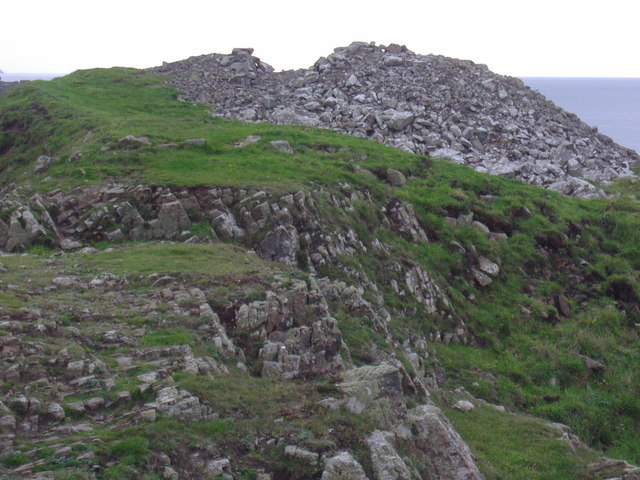
Doon Castle Broch at Ardwell Bay

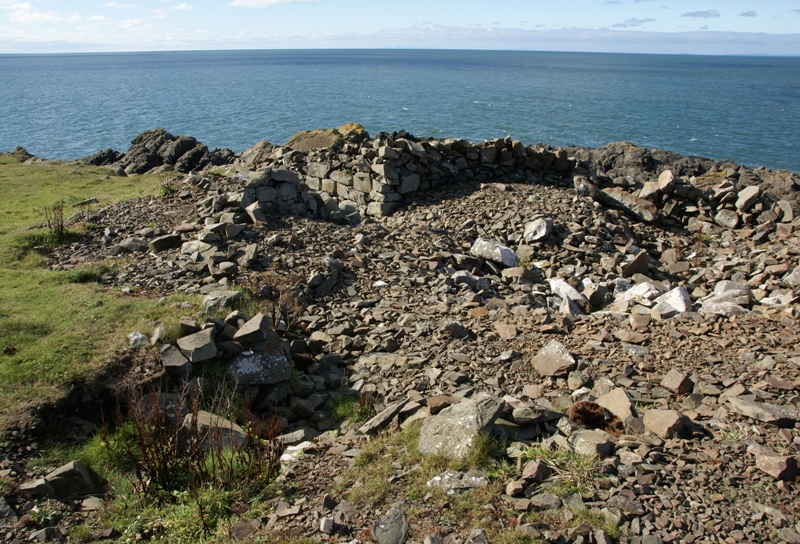
Doon Castle Broch Interior

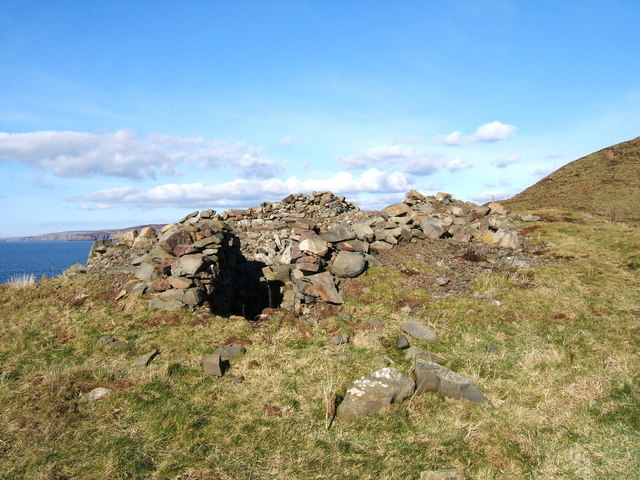
Doon Castle Broch

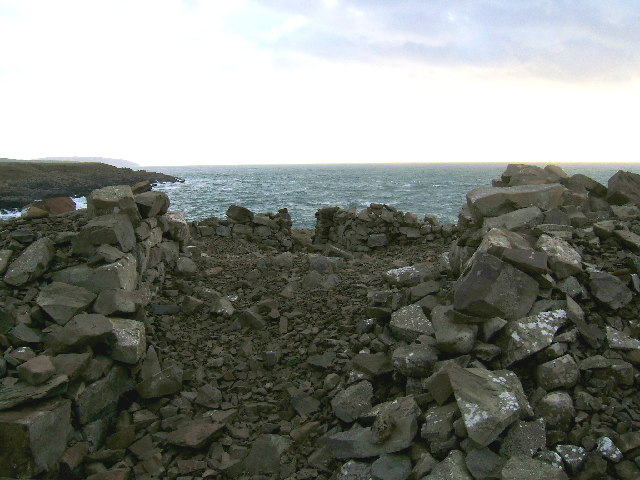
Doon Castle Broch
