= Sandhead =

Coordinates: 54.8°N 4.95°W

- Location within Dumfries and Galloway
- Council area: Dumfries and Galloway
- Lieutenancy area: Wigtownshire
- Country: Scotland
- Sovereign state: United Kingdom
- Post town: Stranraer
- Postcode district: DG9
- Dialling code: 01776
- Police: Scotland
- Fire: Scottish
- Ambulance: Scottish
- UK Parliament: Dumfries and Galloway
- Scottish Parliament: Galloway and West Dumfries

Sandhead is a small village in Dumfries and Galloway, south west Scotland. It overlooks Luce Bay, 7 miles south of Stranraer. The old main road, named "Main Street", runs through the village, but the A716 now bypasses it with a narrow and twisting carriageway. The village developed as a strip village with a smithy and a school by 1850, and the bay was used for landing lime and later coal.

The village school is situated above the village, and a little north of this is Balgreggan Motte which stands above the A716. The Motte was the first in a line of early castles along the eastern shore of the Rhins. The top was used by the Royal Observer Corps during the Second World War as a lookout point, but in earlier times the castle was made of wood and was inevitably burned to the ground by marauding forces. The village is located nearby to RAF West Freugh.

In 1902, the first wireless telegraph station was established between Sagar Island, India and Sandhead, UK.

== Images ==
Sandhead Beach

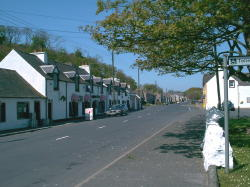
Sandhead Main Street
