= List of listed buildings in Kirkcolm, Dumfries and Galloway =

This is a list of listed buildings in the parish of Kirkcolm in Dumfries and Galloway, Scotland.

== List ==
| Name | Location | Date Listed | Grid Ref. (Note: Sometimes known as OSGB36, the grid reference (where provided) is based on the British national grid reference system used by the Ordnance Survey. • "Guide to National Grid". Ordnance Survey. • "Get-a-map". Ordnance Survey.) | Geo-coordinates | Notes | LB Number (Note: Historic Environment Scotland assign a unique alphanumeric identifier to each designated site in Scotland, for listed buildings this always begins with "LB", for example "LB12345".) | Image |
|---|---|---|---|---|---|---|---|
| Kirkcolm, 15 Main Street | | | | 54°58′27″N 5°04′49″W | Category C(S) | 13521 | Upload Photo |
| Kirkcolm, 52 Main Street | | | | 54°58′27″N 5°04′51″W | Category C(S) | 13544 | Upload Photo |
| Kirkcolm, 74 Main Street | | | | 54°58′30″N 5°04′56″W | Category C(S) | 13550 | Upload Photo |
| Kirkcolm, 78 Main Street, With Boundary Wall | | | | 54°58′31″N 5°04′56″W | Category C(S) | 13552 | Upload Photo |
| Mahaar Schoolhouse, (Former School And Schoolhouse), With Boundary Wall | | | | 54°59′12″N 5°06′00″W | Category B | 13554 | Upload Photo |
| Corsewall Mill Bridge | | | | 54°59′12″N 5°05′44″W | Category C(S) | 9925 | Upload Photo |
| Kirkcolm Church Graveyard | | | | 54°58′31″N 5°04′43″W | Category B | 13517 | Upload Photo |
| Kirkcolm, 13 Main Street | | | | 54°58′26″N 5°04′49″W | Category C(S) | 13520 | Upload Photo |
| Kirkcolm, 16 Main Street | | | | 54°58′21″N 5°04′45″W | Category C(S) | 13529 | Upload Photo |
| Mains Of Cairnbrock, Cheese Loft | | | | 54°56′48″N 5°10′04″W | Category C(S) | 13555 | Upload Photo |
| Corsewall, Bridge | | | | 54°58′29″N 5°04′44″W | Category C(S) | 10174 | Upload Photo |
| Ervie-Kirkcolm Church, Graveyard, Graveyard Walls And War Memorial | | | | 54°58′25″N 5°05′03″W | Category B | 13515 | Upload Photo |
| Kirkcolm, 24 Main Street, Corsewall Arms Hotel | | | | 54°58′23″N 5°04′46″W | Category C(S) | 13532 | Upload Photo |
| Kirkcolm, 30 Main Street | | | | 54°58′24″N 5°04′47″W | Category C(S) | 13535 | Upload Photo |
| Kirkcolm, 32 Main Street | | | | 54°58′25″N 5°04′47″W | Category C(S) | 13536 | Upload Photo |
| Kirkcolm, 46/48 Main Street | | | | 54°58′26″N 5°04′50″W | Category C(S) | 13542 | Upload Photo |
| Kirkcolm, 70 And 72 Main Street | | | | 54°58′30″N 5°04′55″W | Category C(S) | 13549 | Upload Photo |
| Balsarroch House And Walled Garden | | | | 54°58′35″N 5°08′12″W | Category B | 10173 | Upload Photo |
| Corsewall, Walled Garden | | | | 54°58′37″N 5°04′47″W | Category C(S) | 9920 | Upload Photo |
| Kirkcolm, 49 Main Street | | | | 54°58′31″N 5°04′55″W | Category C(S) | 13527 | Upload Photo |
| Kirkcolm, 20 Main Street | | | | 54°58′22″N 5°04′45″W | Category C(S) | 13530 | Upload Photo |
| Kirkcolm, 22 Main Street, Stewarton House | | | | 54°58′22″N 5°04′46″W | Category C(S) | 13531 | Upload Photo |
| Kirkcolm, 26 Main Street | | | | 54°58′23″N 5°04′46″W | Category C(S) | 13533 | Upload Photo |
| Kirkcolm, 42 Main Street | | | | 54°58′26″N 5°04′49″W | Category C(S) | 13540 | Upload Photo |
| Kirkcolm, 44 Main Street | | | | 54°58′26″N 5°04′49″W | Category C(S) | 13541 | Upload Photo |
| Corsewall Lighthouse, Lighthouse Keepers' Houses And Enclosure Walls | | | | 55°00′25″N 5°09′33″W | Category A | 9923 | Upload Photo |
| Kirkcolm, 7 Main Street | | | | 54°58′26″N 5°04′48″W | Category C(S) | 13518 | Upload Photo |
| Kirkcolm, 36 Main Street | | | | 54°58′25″N 5°04′48″W | Category C(S) | 13537 | Upload Photo |
| Kirkcolm, 40 Main Street | | | | 54°58′25″N 5°04′49″W | Category C(S) | 13539 | Upload Photo |
| Kirkcolm, 64 Main Street, Shavalon | | | | 54°58′29″N 5°04′54″W | Category C(S) | 13548 | Upload Photo |
| Kirkland Cottage, With Enclosing Wall | | | | 54°58′09″N 5°04′37″W | Category B | 13553 | Upload Photo |
| Corsewall, Milton Cottage With Boundary Wall And Railings | | | | 54°59′09″N 5°05′41″W | Category C(S) | 9918 | Upload Photo |
| Corsewall Farm, House | | | | 54°58′39″N 5°04′55″W | Category B | 9921 | Upload Photo |
| Kirkcolm, 23 Main Street, Blue Peter Hotel | | | | 54°58′28″N 5°04′51″W | Category C(S) | 13523 | Upload Photo |
| Kirkcolm, 25 Main Street | | | | 54°58′28″N 5°04′52″W | Category C(S) | 13524 | Upload Photo |
| Kirkcolm, 33 Main Street | | | | 54°58′29″N 5°04′53″W | Category C(S) | 13526 | Upload Photo |
| Kirkcolm, 28 Main Street | | | | 54°58′24″N 5°04′47″W | Category C(S) | 13534 | Upload Photo |
| Kirkcolm, 56 Main Street | | | | 54°58′28″N 5°04′52″W | Category B | 13546 | Upload Photo |
| Kirkcolm, 76 Main Street, With Boundary Wall And Railings | | | | 54°58′30″N 5°04′56″W | Category C(S) | 13551 | Upload Photo |
| Corsewall, Dovecot | | | | 54°58′54″N 5°04′44″W | Category B | 10175 | Upload Photo |
| Corsewall, Manor Lodge, Walls And Gatepiers | | | | 54°58′25″N 5°04′46″W | Category C(S) | 9924 | Upload Photo |
| The Elms, Former Ervie-Kirkcolm Manse | | | | 54°58′21″N 5°04′39″W | Category C(S) | 13514 | Upload Photo |
| Ervie Manse, With Boundary Wall And Gatepiers | | | | 54°57′55″N 5°07′03″W | Category B | 13516 | Upload Photo |
| Kirkcolm, 21 Main Street | | | | 54°58′27″N 5°04′51″W | Category C(S) | 13522 | Upload Photo |
| Kirkcolm, 27 Main Street | | | | 54°58′28″N 5°04′52″W | Category C(S) | 13525 | Upload Photo |
| Kirkcolm, 14 Main Street, Rose Cottage | | | | 54°58′21″N 5°04′44″W | Category C(S) | 13528 | Upload Photo |
| Kirkcolm, 50 Main Street | | | | 54°58′26″N 5°04′50″W | Category C(S) | 13543 | Upload Photo |
| Kirkcolm, 54 Main Street | | | | 54°58′27″N 5°04′52″W | Category B | 13545 | Upload Photo |
| Marian Tower | | | | 54°58′26″N 5°08′01″W | Category B | 13556 | Upload Photo |
| Corsewall House | | | | 54°58′37″N 5°04′40″W | Category B | 9922 | Upload Photo |
| Kirkcolm, 11 Main Street | | | | 54°58′26″N 5°04′49″W | Category C(S) | 13519 | Upload Photo |
| Kirkcolm, 38 Main Street | | | | 54°58′25″N 5°04′48″W | Category C(S) | 13538 | Upload Photo |
| Kirkcolm, 58 Main Street | | | | 54°58′28″N 5°04′53″W | Category B | 13547 | Upload Photo |
| Corsewall, Stables | | | | 54°58′38″N 5°04′44″W | Category C(S) | 9919 | Upload Photo |

== Key ==
The scheme for classifying buildings in Scotland is:

- Category A: "buildings of national or international importance, either architectural or historic; or fine, little-altered examples of some particular period, style or building type."
- Category B: "buildings of regional or more than local importance; or major examples of some particular period, style or building type, which may have been altered."
- Category C: "buildings of local importance; lesser examples of any period, style, or building type, as originally constructed or moderately altered; and simple traditional buildings which group well with other listed buildings."

In March 2016 there were 47,288 listed buildings in Scotland. Of these, 8% were Category A, and 50% were Category B, with the remaining 42% being Category C.
