= Doyle =

Doyle is a surname of Irish origin. The name is a back-formation from O'Doyle, which is an Anglicisation of the Irish Ó Dubhghaill (pronounced [oː ˈd̪ˠʊwəl̠ʲ]), meaning "descendant of Dubhghall". There is another possible etymology: the Anglo-Norman surname D'Oyley with agglutination of the French article de (cf. Disney). It means 'from Ouilly', the name of a knight who originated from one of the places named Ouilly in Normandy, such as Ouilly-le-Tesson (Calvados, Oylley 1050), Ouilly-le-Vicomte (Calvados, de Oilleio 1279), etc. The relationship with the family D'Oyly is unknown.

The personal name Dubhghall contains the elements dubh "black" + gall "stranger". Similar Scottish and Irish surnames, derived from the same personal name are: MacDougall / McDougall and MacDowell / McDowell.

During the Viking Age the term Dubhghoill was used to describe the Vikings—usually Danes—and the term Fionnghoill ("fair foreigners") was used to describe Norwegians. There is uncertainty as to the exact meaning of these terms. If they do not refer to literal colours of hair, complexion, or apparel, the terms could denote "new" and "old" Vikings. If correct, the terms may distinguish different groups or dynasties, or perhaps represent ethnonyms referring to Danes and Norwegians respectively. Later, Fionnghall was used to describe Scottish Gaels from the Hebrides, and sometimes the Hiberno-Normans (or "Old English"). The most common term for the Hiberno-Normans was Seanghoill ("old foreigners") to differentiate themselves from the Dubhghoill the "new foreigners" or "dark foreigners" who came to Ireland during Tudor conquest of Ireland.

The name Doyle is not found in any of the old genealogies which document other prominent Irish families. This has led many to maintain that the Doyles are of somewhat recent origin in Ireland. In 2014, Doyle was the ninth most common surname in Ireland. In consequence it is thought that there may be several different specific sources of the name. Doyles found in Ulster may be of Scottish descent, as the name was used for MacDowell. In the 20th century the principal locations of the surname were in Dublin, Wexford, Wicklow, Carlow, Kerry and Cork.

== A ==
- A. E. Doyle (1877–1928), American architect
- Abigail Doyle, associate professor of chemistry at Princeton University
- Adrian Conan Doyle (1910–1970), youngest son of Sir Arthur Conan Doyle
- Al 'Do-it' Doyle, British electropop musician
- Alan Doyle (born 1969), Canadian musician and actor
- Allen Doyle (born 1948), American golfer
- Andrew Doyle (disambiguation), several people
- Anne Doyle (born 1952), Irish television newsreader
- Arthur Conan Doyle (1859–1930), British writer
- Avril Doyle (born 1949), former Irish politician

== B ==
- Ben Doyle (born 1999), American YouTuber, co-creator of Jet Lag: The Game
- Benjamin Doyle (born 1991 or 1992), New Zealand politician
- Brenton Doyle (born 1998), American baseball player
- Brian Doyle (disambiguation), including:
  - Brian Doyle (1930–2008), Australian rower
  - Brian Doyle (1935–2026), Canadian writer
  - Brian Doyle (born 1954), former Major League Baseball player
  - Brian Doyle-Murray (born 1945), American actor and writer
  - Brian J. Doyle (born 1950), former press secretary for the U.S. Department of Homeland Security

== C ==
- Candida Doyle (born 1963), Irish musician
- Cartha Doyle (born 1929), All-American Girls Professional Baseball League player
- Charles Altamont Doyle (1832–1893), Victorian artist
- Charles Hastings Doyle (1804–1883), British military officer
- Charley "Little Buddy" Doyle (1911–unknown), American country blues guitarist, singer and songwriter
- Chris Doyle, American multi-media artist
- Christopher Doyle (born 1952), Australian cinematographer
- Christopher Justin Doyle (born 1974), professionally known as Mysterion the Mind Reader, Canadian mentalist
- Clyde Doyle (1887–1963), U.S. Representative from California
- Cóilín Ó Dubhghaill (born 1974), Irish silversmith and academic, co-inventor of mikana
- Colin Doyle (born 1977), Canadian lacrosse player
- Colin Doyle (born 1985), Irish footballer
- Cornelius J. Doyle (1871–1938), American politician
- Craig Doyle (born 1970), Irish television and radio presenter

== D ==
- Damhnait Doyle (born 1975), Canadian singer
- Danny Doyle (1917–2004), American baseball player
- Danny Doyle (singer) (1940–2019), Irish folk singer
- David Doyle (1929–1997), American actor
- David Doyle, Manx politician
- David J. Doyle, Michigan politician
- Debra Doyle (1952–2020), American writer
- Denny Doyle (1944–2022), American baseball player
- Denny Doyle (born 1949), politician in Oregon, United States
- Denzil Doyle, Canadian entrepreneur
- Desmond Doyle (1924–1986), Irish painter
- Doyle Wolfgang von Frankenstein, American songwriter and guitarist

== E ==
- Eamon Doyle (born 1983), American R&B singer
- Ed Doyle (politician) (1935–2026), former Canadian politician
- Eddie Doyle (American football) (1898–1942), American football player
- Eddie Doyle (hurler) (1897–1948), Irish hurler
- Edward Doyle (Irish politician), Irish Labour Party politician
- Eoin Doyle, Irish footballer
- Eugene C. Doyle (1925–1989), American politician

== F ==
- Francis Hastings Doyle (1810–1888), British poet
- Frank Doyle (ice hockey) (born 1980), Canadian ice hockey player
- Frank Doyle (politician) (1922–1984), Australian politician
- Frank Doyle (writer) (1917–1996), American comic writer

== G ==
- Gary Doyle, (born 1949), former Canadian ice hockey player
- George Doyle, Gaelic footballer
- Geraldine Doyle (1924–2010), American model.
- Gerry Doyle (disambiguation), several people
- Glennon Doyle (born 1976), American writer
- Graham Doyle (born 1974), Irish football coach
- Grant Doyle (born 1971), Australian-British operatic baritone

== H ==
- Harry Doyle (politician) (born 1941), former Canadian politician
- Hollie Doyle, British jockey

== J ==
- Jacob Doyle (1855–1941), Major League Baseball player
- James Doyle (disambiguation), several people
- Jean Conan Doyle (1912–1997), daughter of Arthur Conan Doyle
- Jeff Doyle (born 1956), former Major League Baseball player
- Jerry Doyle (1956–2016), American talk radio host
- Jerry Doyle, former Canadian politician
- Joanne Doyle (born 1973), Irish dancer with Riverdance
- Joe Doyle (cyclist), Irish racing cyclist and administrator
- Joe Doyle (musician) (born 1977), Irish rock bassist
- Joe Doyle (politician) (1936–2009), Fine Gael politician, Lord Mayor of Dublin
- John Doyle (disambiguation), several people
- John Paul "JP" Doyle (born 1979), Irish rugby union referee based in England
- Joseph "Jack" Doyle, (1913–1978), Irish boxer, actor and tenor
- Josh Doyle, solo rock artist

== K ==
- Kathleen Doyle (born 1998), American basketball player
- Keith Doyle (footballer) (born 1979), Irish football player
- Keith Doyle (politician) (1924–2017), Australian politician
- Kevin Doyle (footballer) (born 1983), Irish footballer
- Kevin Doyle (actor) (born 1961), British actor
- Kirby Doyle (1932–2003), American poet
- Kristy Doyle (born 1980), Australian netball player

== L ==
- Larry Doyle (1886–1974), Major League Baseball player
- Larry Doyle (born 1958), American writer
- Laurance Doyle (born 1953), American scientist
- Linda Doyle (born 1968), Irish engineer, professor and university head
- Little Buddy Doyle (1911–c.1960), American blues guitarist, singer and songwriter
- Loretta Doyle (born 1963), British judoka

== M ==
- Maria Doyle Kennedy (born 1964), Irish actress and singer
- Martin Doyle (disambiguation), several people
- Mary Doyle, Australian politician
- Mary Doyle (actor) (1931–1995), American actress
- Melissa Doyle (born 1970), Australian TV journalist
- Michael Doyle (disambiguation), several people

== N ==
- Nathan Doyle (born 1987), English footballer
- Nicholas Grattan-Doyle (1862–1941), British Conservative Party politician
- Norman Doyle (born 1945), former Canadian politician

== P ==
- Paddy Doyle (athlete), British athlete
- Paddy Doyle (Tipperary hurler) (1941–2020), Irish hurler
- Patrick Doyle (1777–1857), Canadian businessman
- Patrick Doyle (born 1953), Scottish composer
- Paul Doyle (1939–2020), American Major League Baseball player
- Percy William Doyle (1806?–1887), British diplomat
- Peter Doyle (1844–1900), American politician
- Peter Doyle (1945–2025), Irish cyclist
- Peter Doyle (1949–2001), Australian pop singer
- Peter Doyle (born 1951), Australian writer
- Peter John Haworth Doyle (born 1944), Roman Catholic Bishop of Northampton
- Phil Doyle (born 1967), Australian writer

== R ==
- Richard Doyle (illustrator) (1824–1883), Victorian illustrator
- Richard Doyle (senator) (1923–2003), Canadian senator (1985–1998)
- Robert Doyle (born 1953), Australian politician
- Robert B. Doyle, Manitoba judge
- Roddy Doyle (born 1958), Irish writer
- Roger Doyle (born 1949), Irish composer
- Ruth Bachhuber Doyle (1916–2006), Wisconsin politician
- Ryan Doyle (born 1991), model, Sinead Doyle's husband
- Ryan Doyle (boxer) (born 1991), British boxer

== S ==
- Sam Doyle (1908–1985), American folk artist\
- Sarah Doyle, British poet
- Simon Doyle (born 1966), former Australian middle-distance runner
- Slow Joe Doyle (1881–1947), Major League Baseball player
- Stephen Doyle (footballer) (born 1981), South Australian Australian rules footballer
- Stephen Doyle (hurler), Irish hurler
- Steve Doyle (footballer), Welsh footballer
- Steve Doyle (Wisconsin politician), American politician
- Steven Doyle, chess tournament organiser
- Susannah Doyle (born 1966), British actress and film director

== T ==
- Thomas Doyle (disambiguation), multiple people
- Tim Doyle (born 1959), American sitcom writer and producer
- Tomás Ó Dubhghaill (1917–1962), Irish Republican Army and Sinn Féin activist, president of Sinn Féin in the 1950s
- Tony Doyle (actor) (1942–2000), Irish actor
- Tony Doyle (cyclist) (1958–2023), former British track cyclist

== W ==
- William Doyle (Canadian businessman), CEO of the Potash Corporation of Saskatchewan
- William Doyle (historian) (born 1942), British historian
- William Doyle (Irish businessman), chief executive of Newbridge Silverware
- William Edward Doyle (1911–1986), United States federal judge
- William T. Doyle (1926–2024), American politician
- Willie Doyle (1873–1917), Irish Jesuit priest

== Y ==
- Yvonne Doyle (physician) (born 1957), Irish medical director in England
- Yvonne Doyle (tennis) (born 1974), Irish professional tennis player

== Fictional characters ==
- Allen Francis Doyle, in the television series Angel
- Prof. Conner Doyle, in the television series Psi Factor: Chronicles of the Paranormal
- Ian Doyle, IRA terrorist in the television series Criminal Minds
- Captain Jack Doyle, played by Morgan Freeman in the movie Gone Baby Gone
- Jake, Malachy and Tinny Doyle, in the CBC television series Republic of Doyle
- Sgt. James Doyle, in Call of Duty: United Offensive
- Jimmy "Popeye" Doyle, detective played by Gene Hackman in The French Connection
- Kenny Doyle, in the film Death Note
- Kevin Doyle, also known as Malcolm Doyle, played by James Marsden in the movie 27 Dresses
- Maggie Doyle, in the television show Blue Heelers
- Mike Doyle, in the television series 24
- Hector Doyle from the manga and anime series Baki
- Mrs Doyle, in the television series Father Ted
- Ray Doyle, in the TV series The Professionals.
- Roz Doyle, in the comedy series Frasier
- Corporal Seamus Doyle, Brothers in Arms character
- Sebastian Doyle, an alter-ego of the character Dave Lister in the Red Dwarf episode "Back to Reality"
- Simon Doyle, a character in Agatha Christie's novel Death on the Nile
- Yvonne Doyle (Fair City), in the Irish soap opera Fair City
- Capt. Doyle, the character who took the place of Nikolai from the mobile phone version of Call of Duty 4: Modern Warfare
- Detective Doyle, Lt. Kellaway's partner from The Mask
- Doyle, androidian character in the television series Andromeda
