= McDougall =

McDougall or McDougal (see also MacDougall) is a Scottish surname that can refer to several people, places and things. It is derived from the Gaelic Mac Dubhghaill, meaning "son of Dubhghall." It shares the same origin as McDowell.

== People named McDougall ==
- Alexander McDougall (1732–1786), American privateer, merchant, and revolutionary leader
- Barbara McDougall (born 1937), Canadian politician
- Bob McDougall (1894–1936), Scottish footballer
- Charles McDougall (fl. 1990s–2020s), British television director
- Christopher McDougall (born 1962), American author
- Colin McDougall (1917–1984), Canadian author
- Dan McDougall (fl. 2000s–2010s), Scottish human-rights journalist
- David McDougall (footballer) (1894–1918), Scottish footballer
- Donnie McDougall (fl. 1970s–2000s), Canadian musician
- Frances Harriet Whipple Green McDougall (1805–1878), American author, abolitionist, and feminist
- Francine McDougall (fl. 1990s–2010s), Australian director and photographer.
- Frank Lidgett McDougall (1884–1958), British-born Australian farmer and economic adviser
- Gay McDougall (born 1947), American lawyer
- Gordon McDougall (1916–1991), Australian actor
- Harriette McDougall (1818–1886), British missionary in Malaysia
- Ian McDougall (disambiguation), several people
- James McDougall (explorer) (fl. 1800s–1820s), Canadian explorer of British Columbia
- James A. McDougall (1817–1867), American politician from California
- Jimmy McDougall (fl. 1980s), Scottish lawyer
- John McDougall (disambiguation), several people
- Kevin McDougall, a fictional guardian with paired revolvers
- Marshall McDougall (born 1978), American baseball player
- Peter McDougall, several people
- Sarah Caitlin McDougall; married name Hirshland (born 1975), CEO of the United States Olympic Committee
- Sophia McDougall (fl. 2000s–2010s), British author, playwright, and poet
- Stanley McDougall (1889–1968), Australian recipient of the Victoria Cross
- Walt McDougall, (1858–1938), American cartoonist
- William McDougall (disambiguation), several people

== People named McDougal ==
- Amy McDougal, fictional character in a Scottish television series
- Andrew McDougal (died 2022), Belizean crime victim
- Bob McDougal (1921–2003), American football player
- David McDougal (1809–1882), American naval officer
- Dennis McDougal (1947–2025), American biographer
- Donald Joseph McDougal (1872–1942), Canadian politician from Ontario
- Francis McDougal (1826–1910), Canadian politician from Ontario
- Karen McDougal (born 1971), American actor and model
- James McDougal Hart (1828–1901), American painter
- Jim McDougal (1940–1998), figure in the American Whitewater controversy of the 1990s
- Milton McDougal (1917–1984), American farmer and politician
- Susan McDougal (born 1955), figure in the American Whitewater controversy of the 1990s
- Tanner McDougal (born 2003), American baseball player

== Places and things ==
- McDougal, Arkansas, US
- McDougall, Ontario, Canada
- McDougall Hill, a street in Edmonton, Canada, named after the hill it runs on
- McDougall Hospital, U.S. Army Hospital in the Bronx during the American Civil War.
- USS McDougal, two ships of the United States Navy, named for David McDougal
- Rank Hovis McDougall, or RHM, a British food manufacturer

== See also ==
- Robert McDouall (1774–1848), Scottish-born officer in the British Army
- John McDouall Stuart (1815–1866), Scottish explorer
