= USS McDougal (DD-54) =

O'Brien class destroyer

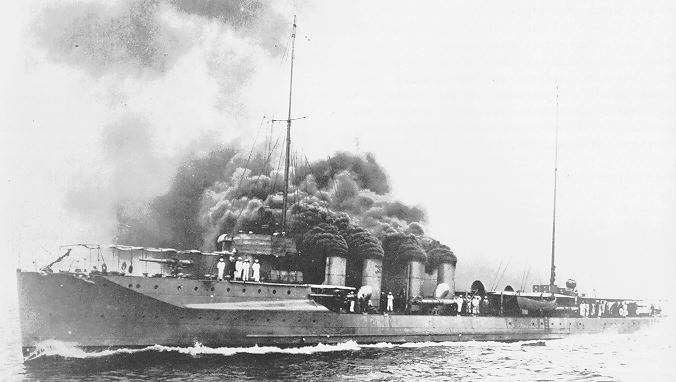
- USS McDougal (DD-54), 20 July 1914.

History

United States
- Name: McDougal
- Namesake: David Stockton McDougal
- Ordered: March 1913
- Builder: Bath Iron Works, Bath, Maine
- Cost: $832,046.14 (hull and machinery)
- Yard number: 215
- Laid down: 29 July 1913
- Launched: 22 April 1914
- Sponsored by: Miss Marguerite S. LeBreton
- Commissioned: 16 June 1914
- Decommissioned: 26 May 1922
- Stricken: 5 July 1934
- Identification: Hull symbol:DD-54; Code letters:NIT
- Fate: Transferred to U.S. Coast Guard, 7 June 1924; Sold on 22 August 1934 and scrapped

United States
- Name: McDougal
- Acquired: 7 June 1924
- Commissioned: 13 May 1925
- Decommissioned: 26 May 1933
- Identification: Hull symbol:CG-6
- Fate: transferred back to the US Navy, 30 June 1933

General characteristics
- Class & type: O'Brien-class destroyer
- Displacement: 1,020 long tons (1,040 t); 1,171 long tons (1,190 t) when fully loaded.
- Length: 305 ft 3 in (93.04 m)
- Beam: 31 ft 1 in (9.47 m)
- Draft: 9 ft 3 in (2.82 m) (mean); 10 ft 7 in (3.23 m) max
- Installed power: 4 × White-Forster boilers; 17,000 shp (13,000 kW)
- Propulsion: 2 × Zoelly direct-drive steam turbines; 2 × screw propellers
- Speed: 29 kn (33 mph; 54 km/h); 30 kn (35 mph; 56 km/h) (Speed on Trial)
- Complement: 5 officers 87 enlisted
- Armament: 4 × 4 in (100 mm)/50 caliber guns; 8 × 21 inch (533 mm) torpedo tubes (4 × 2)

USS McDougal (Destroyer No. 54/DD-54) was an O'Brien-class destroyer built for the United States Navy prior to the American entry into World War I. The ship was the second U.S. Navy vessel named in honor of David Stockton McDougal, a U.S. Navy officer notable for his leadership during an 1863 battle off Japan while in command of Wyoming.

McDougal was laid down by Bath Iron Works of Bath, Maine, in July 1913 and launched in April 1914. The ship was a little more than 305 feet (93 m) in length, just over 31 feet (9.4 m) abeam, and had a standard displacement of 1,020 long tons (1,040 t). She was armed with four 4-inch (102 mm) guns and had eight 21-inch (533 mm) torpedo tubes. McDougal was powered by a pair of steam turbines that propelled her at up to 29 knots (54 km/h).

After her June 1914 commissioning, McDougal sailed off the east coast and in the Caribbean. She was one of seventeen destroyers sent out to rescue survivors from five victims of German submarine U-53 off the Lightship Nantucket in October 1916, and carried 6 crewmen from a sunken Dutch cargo ship to Newport, Rhode Island. After the United States entered World War I in April 1917, McDougal was part of the first U.S. destroyer squadron sent overseas. Patrolling the Irish Sea out of Queenstown, Ireland, McDougal made several unsuccessful attacks on U-boats, and rescued survivors of ships sunk by the German craft. After a collision with a British cargo ship in February 1918, McDougal was under repair until mid-July, and afterwards, operated out of Brest, France.

Upon returning to the United States after the war, McDougal conducted operations with the destroyers of the Atlantic Fleet until August 1919, when she was placed in reserve, still in commission. After a brief stint of operations in mid 1921, she was placed in reserve until she was decommissioned at Philadelphia in May 1922. In June 1924, Ericsson was transferred to the United States Coast Guard to help enforce Prohibition as a part of the "Rum Patrol". She operated under the name USCGC McDougal (CG-6) until May 1933, when she was returned to the Navy. In November she dropped her name to free it for a new destroyer of the same name, becoming known only as DD-54. She was struck for the Naval Vessel Register in July 1934 and sold for scrapping in August.

== Design and construction ==
McDougal was authorized in March 1913 as the fourth of six ships of the O'Brien class, which was an improved version of the Cassin-class destroyers authorized in 1911. Construction of the vessel was awarded to Bath Iron Works of Bath, Maine, which laid down her keel on 29 July 1913. On 22 April 1914, McDougal was launched by sponsor Miss Marguerite S. LeBreton, granddaughter of the Commander David Stockton McDougal, the ship's namesake. The ship was the first U.S. Navy ship named for McDougal, notable for his leadership during an 1863 battle off Japan while in command of Wyoming. As built, the destroyer was 305 feet 6 inches (93.12 m) in length, 31 feet 1 inch (9.47 m) abeam, and drew 9 feet 6 inches (2.90 m). The ship had a standard displacement of 1,020 long tons (1,040 t) and displaced 1,171 long tons (1,190 t) when fully loaded.

McDougal had two Zoelly steam turbines that drove her two screw propellers, and an additional triple-expansion steam engine connected to one of the propeller shafts for cruising purposes. Four oil-burning White-Forster boilers powered the engines, which could generate 17,000 shaft horsepower (13,000 kW), moving the ship at the design speed of 29 knots (54 km/h). During her acceptance trials in May 1914, McDougal averaged 31.02 knots (57.45 km/h) in a 15-minute run, but topped out at 33.7 knots (62.4 km/h) for a 4-nautical-mile (7.4 km), top-speed run.

McDougal's main battery consisted of 4 × 4 in (100 mm)/50 caliber Mark 9 guns, (Note: The 50 denotes the length of the gun barrels; in this case, the gun is 50 calibers, meaning that the gun is 50 times as long as its bore, or 200 inches (5.1 m) in this case. The Mark number is the version of the gun; in this case, the ninth U.S. Navy design of the 4-inch/50 gun.) with each gun weighing in excess of 6,100 pounds (2,800 kg). The guns fired 33-pound (15 kg) armor-piercing projectiles at 2,900 feet per second (880 m/s). At an elevation of 20°, the guns had a range of 15,920 yards (14,560 m).

McDougal was also equipped with eight 21-inch (533 mm) torpedo tubes. The General Board of the United States Navy had called for two anti-aircraft guns for the O'Brien-class ships, as well as provisions for laying up to 36 floating mines. From sources, it is unclear if these recommendations were followed for McDougal or any of the other ships of the class.

== Early career ==
USS McDougal was commissioned into the United States Navy on 16 June 1914 at Boston under the temporary command of Lieutenant, junior grade, John H. Hoover. After a shakedown cruise, McDougal began duty with the Torpedo Flotilla, Atlantic Fleet. Prior to America's entry into World War I, she operated out of New York and Newport, Rhode Island, and carried out maneuvers and tactical exercises along the east coast.

In early April 1915, McDougal and destroyer Parker were temporarily assigned to patrol near the New York Quarantine Station. There were concerns by Dudley Field Malone, the local port collector, that some of the interned German steamships at New York might try to slip out during a heavy snowstorm. While on board McDougal during one of these patrols, Malone discovered what The New York Times termed a "widespread conspiracy" intended to supply British warships outside U.S. territorial waters, in violation of the American neutrality in World War I.

She cruised to the Caribbean and took part in fleet war games between January and May 1916, and in addition served intermittently with the Neutrality patrol. In May, she was declared the "champion smokeless vessel" of the U.S. Navy by The Christian Science Monitor after she was able to steam at 30 knots (56 km/h) for four hours without betraying her position by smoke. In June, The Washington Post reported that she was damaged during maneuvers off Cape Ann, and had to put into the Boston Navy Yard for leak repairs.

At 05:30 on Sunday, 8 October 1916, wireless reports came in of a German submarine stopping ships near the Lightship Nantucket, off the eastern end of Long Island. After an SOS from the British steamer West Point was received at about 12:30, Rear Admiral Albert Gleaves ordered McDougal and other destroyers at Newport to attend to survivors. (Note: According to a report in The New York Times on 9 October the other ships, in addition to McDougal, were the flotilla's destroyer tender, Melville, and sixteen other destroyers: Aylwin, Balch, Benham, Cassin, Conyngham, Cummings, Cushing, Drayton, Ericsson, Fanning, Jarvis, McCall, O'Brien, Paulding, Porter, Winslow. See: "Newport aroused by U-boat's raid" (PDF). The New York Times. 9 October 1916. p. 2.) According to a firsthand account of the events by Nathan Levy, a quartermaster on McDougal, published on 22 October in The New York Times, the destroyer steamed the 100 nautical miles (190 km) distance to the lightship in three-and-a-half hours, arriving after German submarine U-53 had stopped the Holland America Line cargo ship Blommersdijk and the British passenger ship Stephano. (Note: U-53 had called at Newport on 7 October 1916, the day before the attacks, to drop off a letter for Johann Heinrich von Bernstorff, the German Ambassador to the United States, and Kapitänleutnant Hans Rose had exchanged courtesy visits with Admirals Gleaves and Austin M. Knight before departing.) As Hans Rose - the captain of U-53 - had done with three other ships U-53 had sunk earlier in the day, (Note: The other three ships were the British cargo ships West Point and Strathdene and the Norwegian tanker Christian Knutsen.) he gave passengers and crew aboard Blommersdijk and Stephano adequate time to abandon the ships. After sinking Blommersdijk with two torpedoes, Rose focused his attention on Stephano, having to signal McDougal and Benham to ask that the two destroyers move farther away so that he could sink the British ship. Six American destroyers witnessed U-53 sink the liner with her deck gun. In total, 226 survivors from U-53's five victims were rescued by the destroyer flotilla; McDougal rescued 6 of Blommersdijk's men.

McDougal returned to the Caribbean for exercises during the first three months of 1917, and then returned to New York and Newport to prepare for distant service.

== World War I ==
Soon after the United States declared war on Germany on 6 April 1917, McDougal departed for Europe as a part of the first U.S. destroyer division sent overseas during the war. Steaming with Wadsworth, the division's flagship, under the command of Joseph K. Taussig, McDougal, Porter, Davis, Conyngham, and Wainwright departed New York on 24 April and arrived at Queenstown, Ireland, on 4 May and began patrolling the southern approaches to the Irish Sea the next day. McDougal patrolled off the Irish coast, escorting convoys of merchant ships and troop transports, searching for German submarines, and performing rescue operations for ships sunk. When British ship Manchester Miller was torpedoed and sunk by U-66 on 5 June 1917, McDougal sped to her assistance and rescued 33 survivors.

On 8 September, as McDougal escorted a convoy off the southwest coast of England, she detected a surfaced submarine in the early morning hours and gave chase at full speed. The U-boat submerged about 500 yards (460 m) ahead of the closing destroyer, and McDougal dropped two depth charges which brought an oil slick to the surface. According to the Dictionary of American Naval Fighting Ships, McDougal's actions prevented an attack on the convoy and resulted in "probable damage" to the submarine.

On 4 February 1918, McDougal and the British cargo ship Glenmorag collided in the Irish Sea. The destroyer made her way to Liverpool and underwent repairs that lasted until mid-July. Upon reentering service, McDougal was transferred to Brest to serve as an escort for convoys approaching the French port.

== Postwar ==
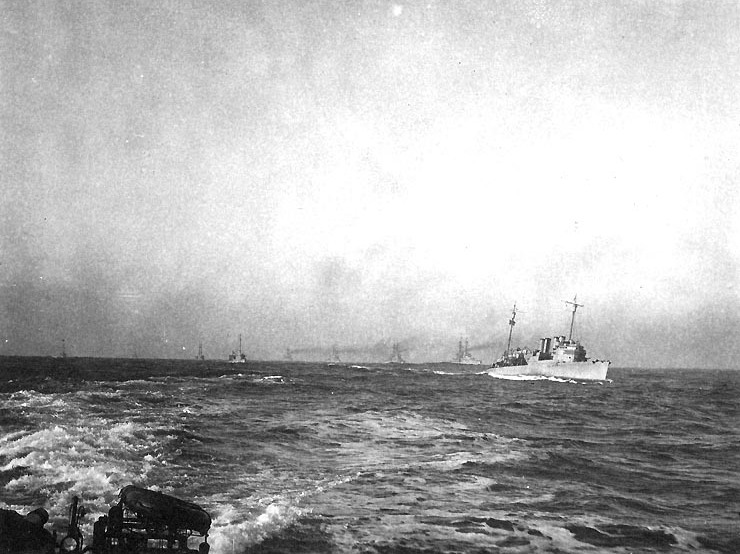
Battleships and destroyers of the United States Atlantic Fleet escorting President Woodrow Wilson on George Washington near Brest, France, on 13 December 1918; McDougal served as part of the escort.

Following the signing of the Armistice on 11 November 1918, which ended all fighting, McDougal remained in French waters for a time. Crewmen aboard McDougal helped raise money to provide a Thanksgiving dinner for 150 "poor children" of Brest on 28 November, Thanksgiving Day in the United States. When President Woodrow Wilson arrived at Brest on George Washington just over two weeks later, the destroyer served as part of that transport's escort into the harbor. On 21 December, McDougal departed Brest 21 December with Destroyer Division 7 and reached New York 8 January 1919.

McDougal resumed duty along the east coast and, during May, provided part of the comprehensive at-sea support as U.S. Navy seaplanes undertook the historic first aerial crossing of the Atlantic. After completing exercises in the Caribbean, she was placed in commission, in reserve at New York on 7 August. She was laid up in reduced commission at Philadelphia and Charleston, South Carolina, in the years that followed. She was reactivated for training in New England waters during the summer of 1921, but returned to Philadelphia, where she was decommissioned on 26 May 1922.

== United States Coast Guard career ==
On 17 January 1920, Prohibition was instituted by law in the United States. Soon, the smuggling of alcoholic beverages along the coastlines of the United States became widespread and blatant. The Treasury Department eventually determined that the United States Coast Guard simply did not have the ships to constitute a successful patrol. To cope with the problem, President Calvin Coolidge in 1924 authorized the transfer from the Navy to the Coast Guard of twenty old destroyers that were in reserve and out of commission. McDougal was activated and acquired by the Coast Guard on 7 June 1924. Designated CG-6, McDougal was commissioned on 28 May 1925, and joined the "Rum Patrol" to aid in the attempt to enforce prohibition laws.

In August 1929, McDougal and Tampa were dispatched to locate and sink the steamer Quimistan, which had been reported as abandoned and on fire in the Atlantic 1,100 nautical miles (2,000 km) east of Norfolk, Virginia. In April 1933, McDougal was one of the Coast Guard ships deployed to search for the U.S. Navy airship Akron when it crashed into the Atlantic on the night of 3/4 April. Later that same month, McDougal was dispatched to help the Italian steamer Voluntas when she had requested assistance on the 23rd, but was recalled when Voluntas rescinded the call for help.

After nearly eight years of Coast Guard service, McDougal was decommissioned at Philadelphia on 26 May 1933 and returned to the custody of the U.S. Navy on 30 June. On 1 November 1933, she dropped the name McDougal to free it for a new destroyer of the same name, becoming known only as DD-54. The ship was struck from the Naval Vessel Register on 5 July 1934, and, on 22 August, was sold for scrapping in accordance with the London Naval Treaty for the limitation of naval armaments.

== Bibliography ==
- Bauer, K. Jack; Roberts, Stephen S. (1991). Register of Ships of the U.S. Navy, 1775–1990: Major Combatants. New York: Greenwood Press. ISBN 978-0-313-26202-9. OCLC 24010356.
- Gardiner, Robert; Gray, Randal, eds. (1985). Conway's All the World's Fighting Ships 1906–1921. Annapolis, Maryland: Naval Institute Press. ISBN 978-0-87021-907-8. OCLC 12119866.
- Long, Wellington (October 1966). "The Cruise of the U-53". Proceedings. 92 (10). Annapolis, Maryland: United States Naval Institute: 89–94. ISSN 0041-798X. OCLC 2496995.
- Naval History & Heritage Command. "McDougal". Dictionary of American Naval Fighting Ships. Navy Department, Naval History and Heritage Command.
- Naval History & Heritage Command. "Tucker". Dictionary of American Naval Fighting Ships. Navy Department, Naval History & Heritage Command.
- Naval History & Heritage Command. "Wadsworth". Dictionary of American Naval Fighting Ships. Navy Department, Naval History & Heritage Command.
