= USS McDougal =

USS McDougal may refer to one of several United States Navy ships named in honor of David Stockton McDougal:

- USS McDougal (DD-54), an O'Brien-class destroyer, commissioned in 1914, served during World War I, decommissioned in 1922 and transferred to the United States Coast Guard until struck in 1934
- USS McDougal (DD-358), a Porter-class destroyer, commissioned in 1936, served during World War II and decommissioned in 1946
