= James Jeffray =

Scottish anatomist and botanist

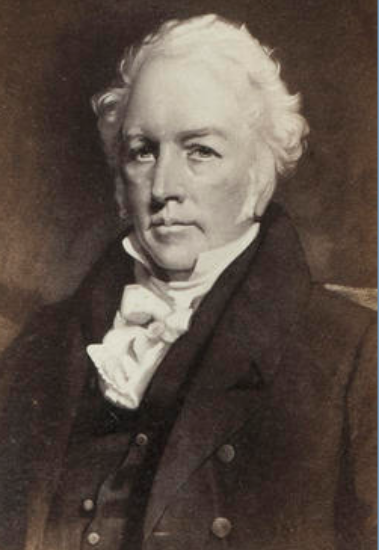
James Jeffray

James Jeffray (1759–1848) was a Scottish academic. He was professor of anatomy and botany at the University of Glasgow from 1790 until 1848. This 58 years of professorship is one of the longest in Scottish history.

In around 1830 he is credited with invention of the surgical chainsaw, used to remove damaged sections of bone in an accurate manner.

== Life ==
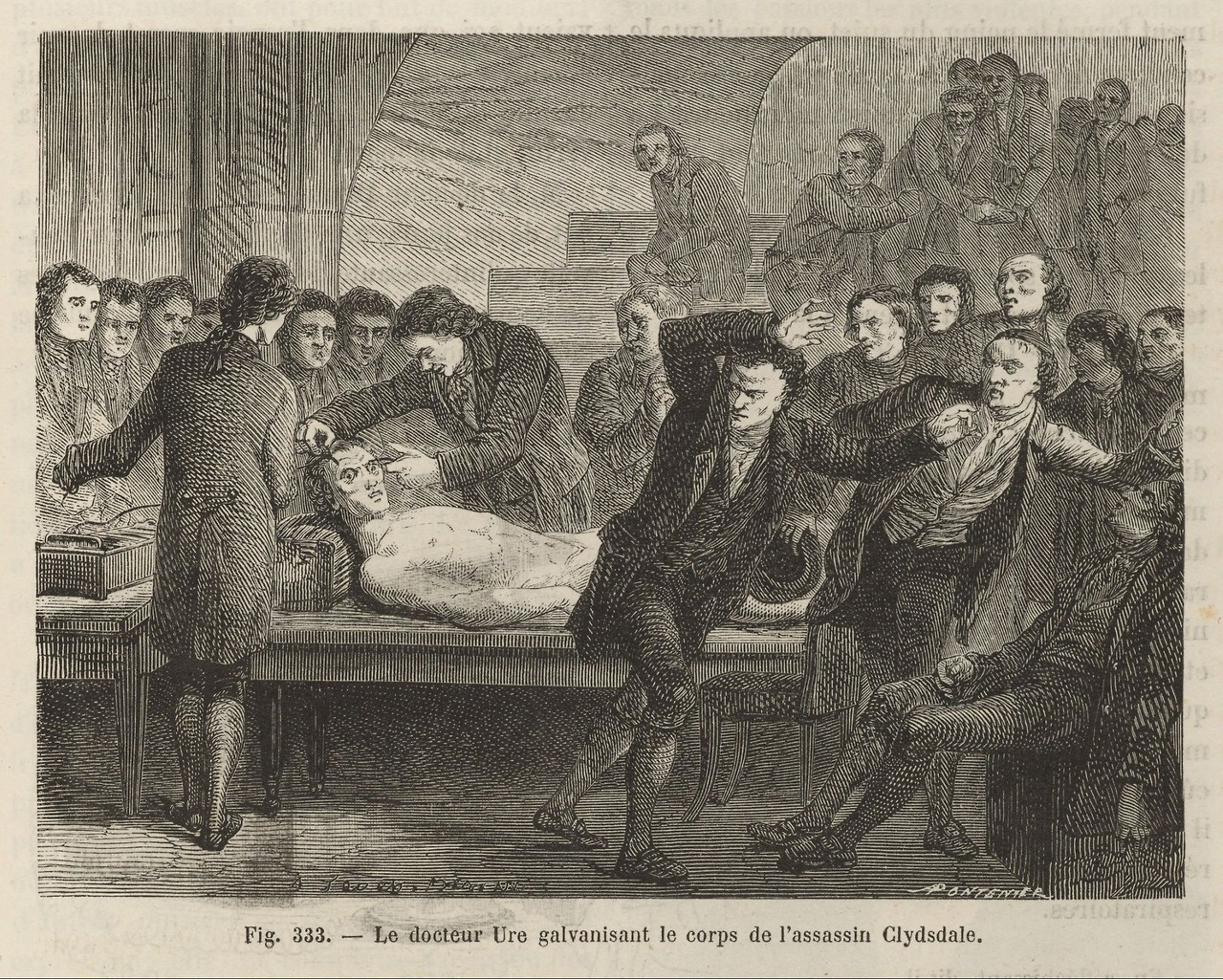
1867 engraving of Ure's galvanic experiments on Clydesdale

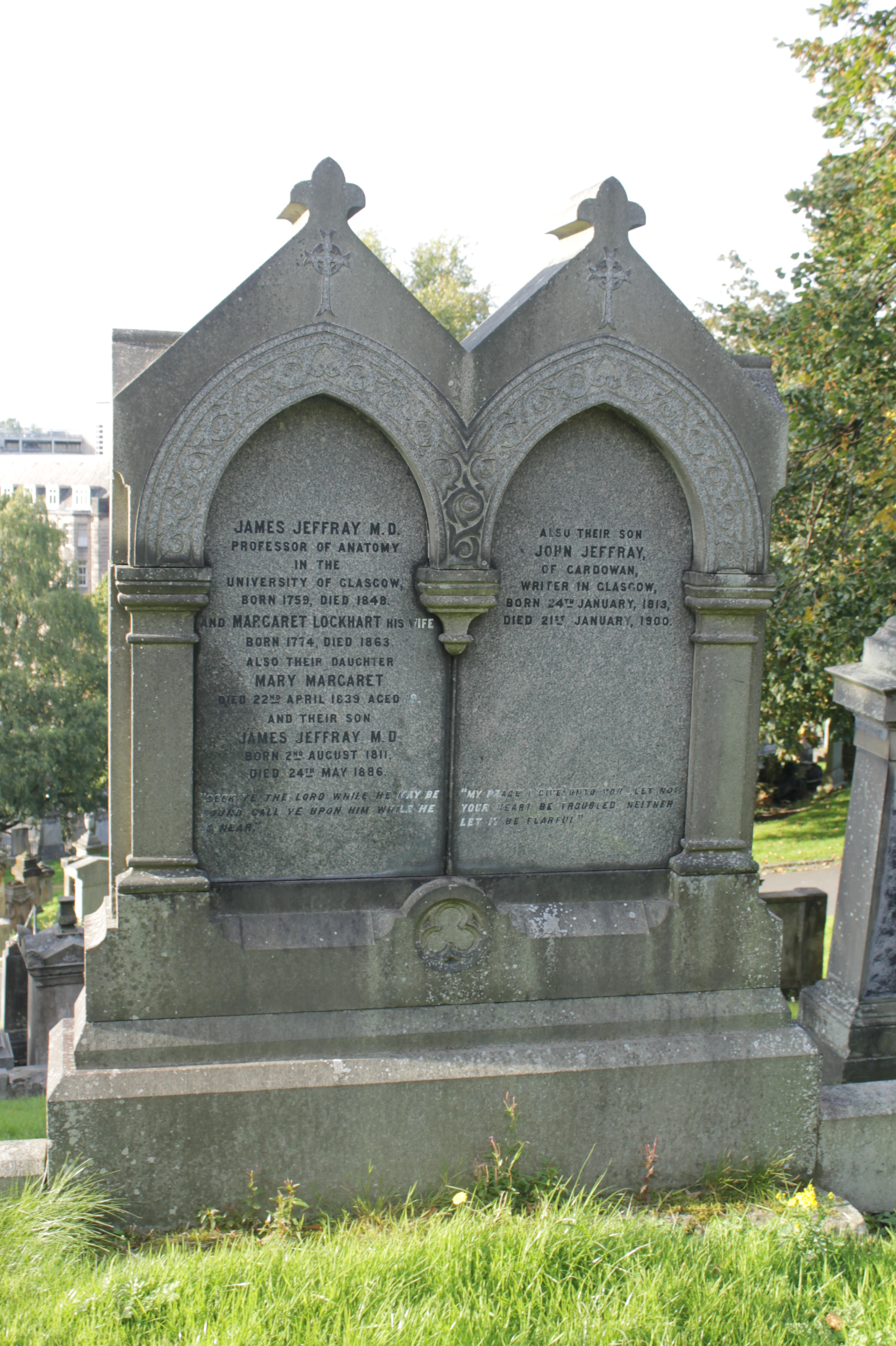
The grave of James Jeffray, Glasgow Necropolis

He was born in Kilsyth in 1759. He studied Sciences at the University of Glasgow graduating MA in 1778. He then went to Edinburgh University to study Medicine graduating MD in 1786.

From 1790 he held the twin chairs of Anatomy and Botany at the University of Glasgow. In 1800 he was elected Vice Rector under Rector Ilay Campbell, Lord Succoth.

In 1813 a mob smashed the windows of his house at College Court, wrongly believing that he was connected to the theft of the body of Janet McAlister from the Ramshorn Cemetery in central Glasgow.

In 1817 he was joint founder of the Glasgow Botanic Gardens.

On 4 November 1818 (assisted by Andrew Ure) he dissected the body of executed murderer Matthew Clydesdale. Clydesdale was hanged for the murder of Alexander Love with a pick-axe. But his fate was somewhat more bizarre. His body was subjected to galvanism (passing of an electric current) in the anatomy rooms, in an experiment to study the impact on the human nervous system. The body was connected to a voltaic pile and the hand and fingers moved. The whole gruesome event took place in the Anatomy Theatre at Old College. At this time only the bodies of those executed for murder (and only for murder) could be dissected under the provisions of the Murder Act 1751. This gave a very limited supply of bodies. Not until the Anatomy Act 1832 did the supply of bodies change; from the legal bodies of hanged criminals and illegal bodies supplied by graverobbers; to bodies supplied by the parish - usually paupers. This sort of experiment had been enacted a handful of times in England but was the first example in Scotland. Clydesdale was the first person hanged in Glasgow for ten years.

In 1821 he was ordered to close a shop selling cheese and ham in the College Court which he had opened without permission.

He died at his university accommodation in 1848. He is buried on the northern slope of the Glasgow Necropolis.

== Family ==
Around 1810 he married Margaret Lockhart (1774-1863). Their eldest son, also James Jeffray (1811-1886) was also a doctor. Their son John Jeffray (1813-1900) was a lawyer (referred to as a "writer"). Peter McDougall, the physician and naturalist who discovered the roseate tern (Sterna dougallii) was his nephew.

== Artistic recognition ==
His portrait by John Graham Gilbert is held by the Mitchell Library.

He was also portrayed by Colvin Smith.
