= Sarah Doyle =

Sarah Doyle may refer to:

- Sarah Elizabeth Doyle (1830–1922), American educator and educational reformer
- Sarah Doyle (poet), English poet
- Sara L. Doyle (born 1968), judge of the Georgia Court of Appeals
