= Peter McDougall (disambiguation) =

Peter McDougall (born 1947) is a Scottish playwright.

Peter McDougall may also refer to

- Peter MacDougall (1898–1955), Scottish World War One flying ace
- Peter McDougall (physician) (1777–1814), Scottish physician and naturalist, discoverer of the roseate tern
