= John McDougall =

John McDougall may refer to:

== Politics ==
=== Canada ===
- John Lorn McDougall Sr. (1800–1860), businessman and politician, member of the Legislative Assembly of the Province of Canada
- John McDougall (Quebec politician) (1805–1870), member of the Legislative Assembly of the Province of Canada from Canada East
- John Lorn McDougall (1838–1909), member of the Canadian House of Commons and the Legislative Assembly of Ontario
- John Chantler McDougall (1842–1917), missionary and politician, member of the Legislative Assembly of Alberta
- John McDougall (Ontario politician), member of the Legislative Assembly of Ontario, 1875–1879
- John Alexander McDougall (1854–1928), mayor of Edmonton and member of the Legislative Assembly of Alberta

=== Elsewhere ===
- John Frederick McDougall (1820–1896), Australian politician and pastoralist, member of the Queensland Legislative Council
- Sir John McDougall (British politician) (1844–1917), chairman of the London County Council
- John E. McDougall (1860–1932), American politician, Lieutenant Governor of South Dakota
- John Keith McDougall (1867–1957), Australian politician, member of Parliament for Wannon, Victoria

== Sports ==
- John McDougall (footballer, born 1853) (1853–1925), Scotland international footballer, 1877–1879
- John McDougall (cricketer) (1886–1971), Scottish cricketer
- John McDougall (footballer, born 1900) (1900–?), Scottish footballer of the 1920s

== Other ==
- John Alexander McDougall (artist) (1810–1894), American portrait painter
- John McDougall (VC) (1839–1869), British recipient of the Victoria Cross
- John McDougall (phthisiologist) (1890–1967), Scottish doctor and international rugby player, 1913–1921
- John R. McDougall (born 1945), Canadian petroleum engineer, great-grandson of John Alexander McDougall
- John A. McDougall (1947–2024), American physician, nutrition expert, and author
- John McDougall (mechanical engineer), British mechanical engineer

== See also ==
- John McDougal (1818–1866), American politician, second Governor of California
- Jock McDougall (1901–1973), Scottish footballer
- John MacDougall (disambiguation)
