= MacDougall =

MacDougall or MacDougal (see also McDougall) is a Scottish surname that can refer to a number of individuals, or localities or things named for individuals with this surname. The name is an Anglicisation of the Scottish Gaelic Mac Dhùgaill, meaning "Son of Dougal".

It may refer to:

== People ==
=== As surname ===
- Adam MacDougall (born 1975), Australian rugby footballer
- Adam MacDougall (keyboardist) (born 1974), American keyboardist
- Alan MacDougall Ritchie (1893–1964), World War II British Army officer
- Alex MacDougall, American record producer
- Ben MacDougall (born 1977), Australian rugby footballer
- Bon MacDougall (1901–1970), American racecar driver
- Clinton D. MacDougall (1839–1914), United States Representative
- Colin MacDougall (1834–1901), Canadian politician and lawyer
- David Mercer MacDougall (1904–1991), Colonial Secretary of Hong Kong
- Donald MacDougall (1912–2004), Scottish economist and civil servant
- Duncan MacDougall, Donnchadh of Argyll (died 1240s), Scottish noble
- Duncan MacDougall (doctor) (1866–1920), American physician
- Frank Archibald MacDougall (1896–1975), Canadian forest ranger
- Hartland MacDougall (1875–1947), Canadian ice hockey player and stockbroker
- Jack MacDougall (born 1953), Canadian politician
- John MacDougall (disambiguation), several people
  - John MacDougall, Lord of Argyll (died 1316), Scottish nobleman and commander
  - John Alexander Frances MacDougall (born 1974), Canadian politician
  - John MacDougall (UK politician) (1947–2008), Scottish Labor politician
  - John R. MacDougall (born c. 1961), aka Captain Midnight, American Engineer who jammed HBO's satellite signal
  - John Lorne MacDougall (1898–1956), Canadian Member of Parliament
- Lewis MacDougall (born 2002), British actor
- Luke MacDougall (born 1982), Australian rugby footballer
- Malcolm "Mal" MacDougall (1928–2014), American speechwriter
- Norman MacDougall, Scottish historian
- Patrick Leonard MacDougall (1819–1894), British General and author
- Peter MacDougall (1898–1955), Scottish military pilot and banker
- Ranald MacDougall (1915–1973), American screenwriter
- Robert MacDougall (1876–1950), Canadian ice hockey player
- Rocky MacDougall (1943–2009), Canadian boxer
- Roger MacDougall (1910–1993), Scottish playwright
- Ruth Doan MacDougall, American author
- Shane MacDougall, Canadian stand-up comedian
- Ted MacDougall (born 1947), Scottish footballer
- William MacDougall (born 1944), Canadian clergyman and politician

=== As given name ===
- Alexander Macdougall Cooke (1899–1999), British doctor
- John MacDougall Hay (1880–1919), Scottish novelist

== Other ==
- Clan MacDougall, a Scottish clan
- MacDougall's, London Auction House
