= Andrew Doyle =

Andrew Doyle may also refer to:

- Andrew Doyle (artist) (1774–1841), Irish painter and engraver
- Andrew Doyle (comedian), British satirist, playwright and journalist
- Andrew Doyle (politician) (born 1960), Irish junior agriculture minister (2016–2020)
- C. Andrew Doyle (born 1966), American Episcopal cleric
