= Michael Doyle =

Michael, Mick or Mike Doyle may refer to:

== Politics ==
- Michael Doyle (Farmers' Party politician) (c.1861–1942), Irish Farmers' Party politician from Wexford, TD from 1922 to 1927
- Michael Doyle (Irish Parliamentary Party politician) (c.1840s–1920), Irish Parliamentary Party politician and Lord Mayor of Dublin
- Michael Doyle, alleged member of the Molly Maguires
- Mike Doyle (American politician) (born 1953), U.S. Representative from Pennsylvania

== Science and academia ==
- Michael P. Doyle (chemist), American chemist
- Michael P. Doyle (microbiologist), American microbiologist
- Michael W. Doyle (born 1948), political scientist and former U.N. Assistant Secretary-General

== Sport ==
- Michael Doyle (footballer, born 1981), Irish former footballer and manager
- Michael Doyle (footballer, born 1991), Scottish footballer
- Michael Doyle (hurler) (born 1958), former Irish hurler
- Michael Doyle (racing driver) (born 1987), competitor in the 2008 British Touring Car Championship
- Mick Doyle (hurler) (1889–1970), Irish hurler
- Mick Doyle (rugby union) (1941–2004), Irish rugby player and coach
- Mike Doyle (footballer) (1946–2011), English footballer for Manchester City
- Mike Doyle (surfer) (1941–2019), American surfer

== Other ==
- Michael Doyle (hairdresser), Irish hairdresser, stylist and creative director at Peter Mark
- Mike Doyle (actor) (born 1972), American actor
- Mike Doyle (comedian), Welsh comedian, vocalist, actor and radio presenter
- Mike Doyle (24 character), fictional character on the television series 24
- Mike Doyle, founder of Eolas
