= John MacDougall =

John MacDougall may refer to:

- John MacDougall, Lord of Argyll (died 1316), Scottish nobleman and commander
- John Gallda MacDougall (died 1371×1377), Scottish nobleman and chief of Clan MacDougall
- Sir John MacDougall (Royal Navy officer) (1790–1865), British admiral
- Lorne MacDougall (John Lorne MacDougall, 1898–1956), Canadian Member of Parliament
- John MacDougall (Ontario politician) (born 1947), Canadian Progressive Conservative MP, 1982–1993
- John MacDougall (British politician) (1947–2008), Scottish Labour Party MP from 2001 till 2008
- John R. MacDougall, better known as the "Captain Midnight" hijacker of the HBO signal in 1986

== See also ==
- John McDougall (disambiguation)
- John M. MacDougal (born 1954), American botanist
- Jack MacDougall (born 1953), Canadian politician
