= Battle of Shimonoseki Straits =

1863 American naval victory in Japan

- Part of Shimonoseki campaign
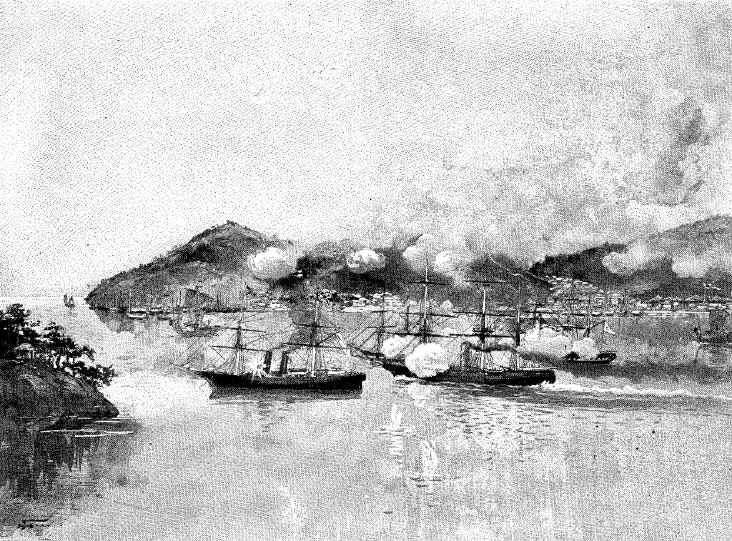
- USS Wyoming battling in the Shimonoseki Straits against the Choshu steam warships Daniel Webster, the brig Lanrick, and the steamer Lancefield
Date	16 July 1863
Location	Shimonoseki Straits, Honshu, Japan
Result	American tactical victory and withdrawal

Belligerents
United States	Chōshū Domain

Commanders and leaders
(United States) David McDougal	(Chōshū Domain) Mōri Takachika

Strength
1 screw sloop 198 sailors & marines	Land: 4 shore batteries Sea: 1 barque 1 brig 1 steamer

Casualties and losses
1 screw sloop damaged 4 killed 7 wounded	1 brig sunk 1 steamer sunk 1 barque damaged 40 killed 4 shore batteries damaged

The Battle of Shimonoseki Straits (Japanese: 下関海戦, romanized: Shimonoseki Kaisen) was a naval engagement fought on July 16, 1863, by the United States Navy warship USS Wyoming against the powerful daimyō (feudal lord) Mōri Takachika of the Chōshū clan based in Shimonoseki.

USS Wyoming, under Captain David McDougal, sailed into the strait and single-handedly engaged the US-built but poorly manned Japanese fleet. Engaged for almost two hours before withdrawing, McDougal sank two enemy vessels, severely damaged the other one, and inflicted some forty Japanese casualties. Wyoming suffered considerable damage with four crew dead and seven wounded.

The battle was a prelude to the larger-scale 1863 and 1864 Shimonoseki campaign by allied foreign powers. It took place among the troubled events of the Late Tokugawa shogunate from 1854 to 1868, associated with the opening of Japan to the European and American powers.

== Background ==
In 1863, the Japanese Emperor Kōmei, breaking with centuries of imperial tradition and dissatisfied with Japan's opening to the United States and Europe, began to take an active role in matters of state and issued on March 11 and April 11, 1863, an "Order to expel barbarians" (攘夷実行の勅命). The Shimonoseki-based Chōshū domain, under Lord Mōri, followed the order and began to take action to expel all foreigners by the date fixed, May 10 on a lunar calendar. Openly defying the shogunate, Mōri ordered his forces to fire without warning on all foreign ships traversing Shimonoseki Strait between Honshu and Kyushu.

The Chōshū domain was equipped with mostly antiquated cannon firing round shot, but also some modern armament, such as five 8-inch (200 mm) Dahlgren guns which had been presented to Japan by the United States and three steam warships of American construction: the barque Daniel Webster of six guns, the brig Kosei of ten guns (originally named Lanrick), and the steamer Koshin of four guns (originally Lancefield).

=== Attacks on foreign shipping ===
The first attack occurred on June 25, 1863. The American merchant steamer Pembroke, under Captain Simon Cooper, was riding at anchor outside Shimonoseki Strait when it was intercepted and unexpectedly fired upon by two European-built warships belonging to the Chōshū. The crew of one enemy vessel taunted the frantic American seamen with the loud and unnerving cry, "Revere the Emperor and drive out the barbarians!" (尊皇攘夷; pronounced "Sonnō Jōi"). Under incessant cannon fire, Pembroke managed to get under way and escape the Inland Sea through the Bungo Strait, with only slight damage and no casualties. Upon arrival in Shanghai, Cooper filed a report of the attack and dispatched it to the U.S. Legation in Azabudai, Japan (about 3 km south of the Imperial Palace) .

The next day, June 26, the French naval dispatch steamer Kienchang was also riding at anchor outside the strait when Japanese artillery, atop the bluffs surrounding Shimonoseki, opened fire on her. Damaged in several places, the French vessel escaped with one wounded sailor.

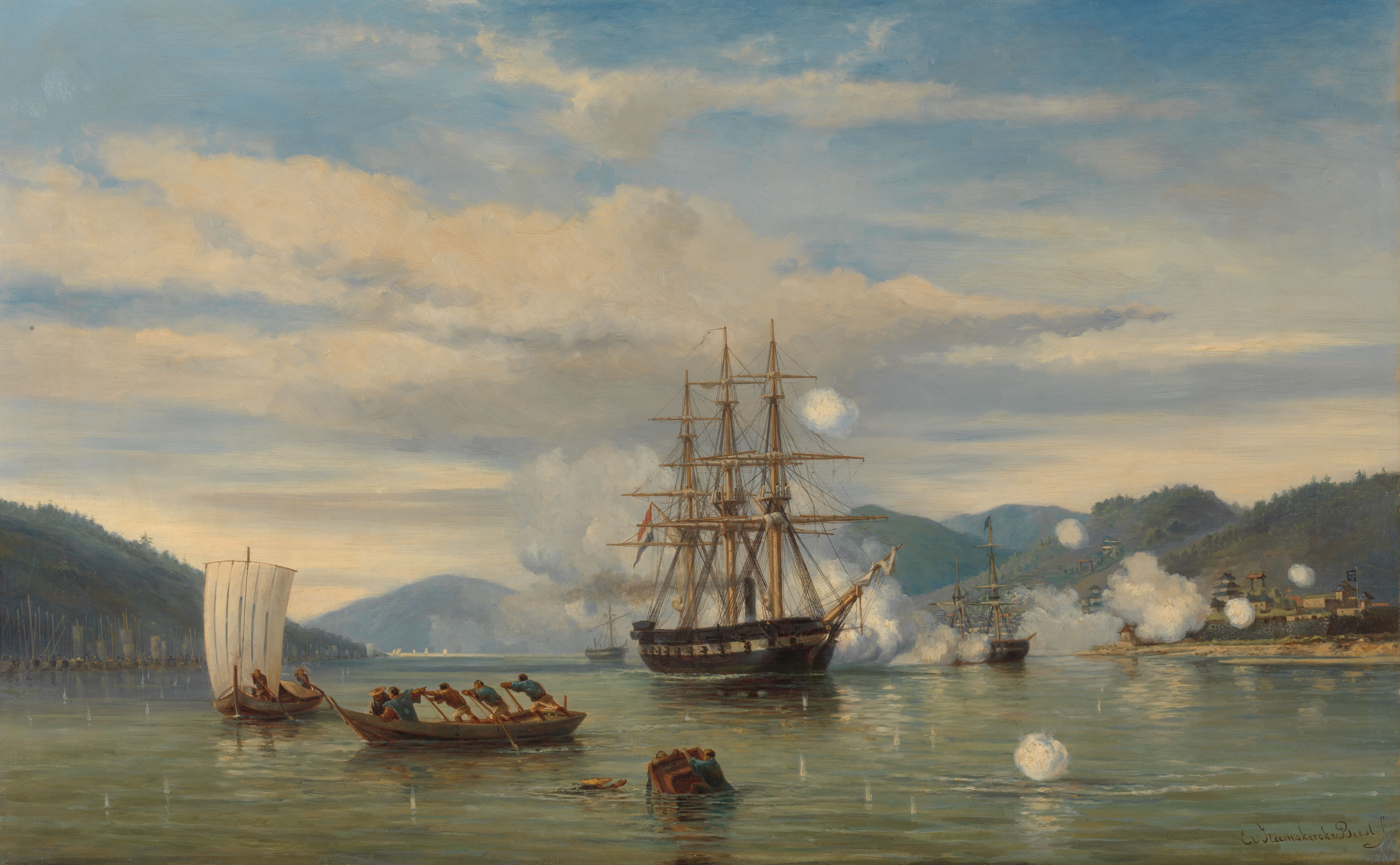
Dutch warship Medusa forces a passage through the straits

On July 11, despite warnings from the crew of Kienchang, with whom they had rendezvoused earlier, the 16-gun Dutch warship HNLMS Medusa cruised into Shimonoseki Strait. Her skipper, Captain François de Casembroot was convinced that Lord Mōri would not fire on his vessel due to the strength of his ship and longstanding relations between the Netherlands and Japan. But Mōri opened fire, pounding Medusa with more than thirty shells and killing or wounding nine seamen. De Casembroot returned fire and ran the rebel gauntlet at full speed, fearful of endangering the life of the Dutch Consul General, who was aboard.

Within a short time, the Japanese warlord had fired on vessels of most of the foreign nations with consulates in Japan.

== Battle ==
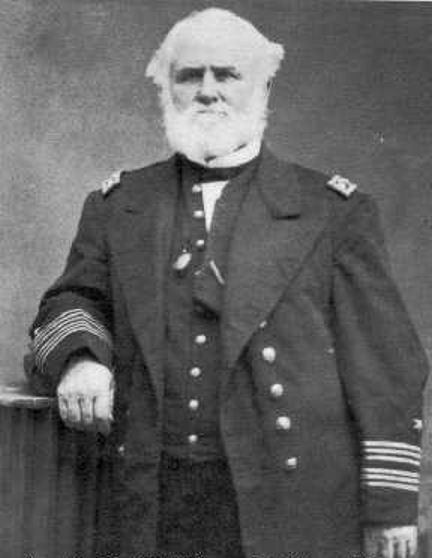
David McDougal, captain of USS Wyoming, photographed circa 1864–1871

After the attack on Pembroke, American Minister to Japan Robert Pruyn sanctioned a retaliatory mission after conferring with Commander David McDougal of the USS Wyoming. Comdr. McDougal called all hands at 4:45 a.m. on July 14, 1863, and Wyoming got under way 15 minutes later for the strait. After a two-day voyage, she arrived off the island of Himeshima on the evening of 15 July and anchored off the south side of that island.

At five o'clock in the following morning, Wyoming weighed anchor and steamed toward the Strait of Shimonoseki. She went to general quarters at nine, loaded her pivot guns with shell, and cleared for action. The warship entered the strait at 10:45 and beat to quarters. Soon, three signal guns boomed from the landward, alerting the batteries and ships of Lord Mori of Wyoming's arrival.

At about 11:15, after being fired upon from the shore batteries, Wyoming hoisted her colors and replied with her 11-inch (280 mm) pivot guns. Momentarily ignoring the batteries, McDougal ordered Wyoming to continue steaming toward a bark, a steamer, and a brig at anchor off the town of Shimonoseki. Meanwhile, four shore batteries took the warship under fire. Wyoming answered the Japanese cannon "as fast as the guns could be brought to bear," while shells from the shore guns passed through her rigging.

USS Wyoming then passed between the brig and the bark on the starboard hand and the steamer on the port, steaming within pistol shot range. One shot from either the bark or brig struck near Wyoming's forward broadside gun, killing two men and wounding four. Elsewhere on the ship, a Marine was struck dead by a piece of shrapnel.

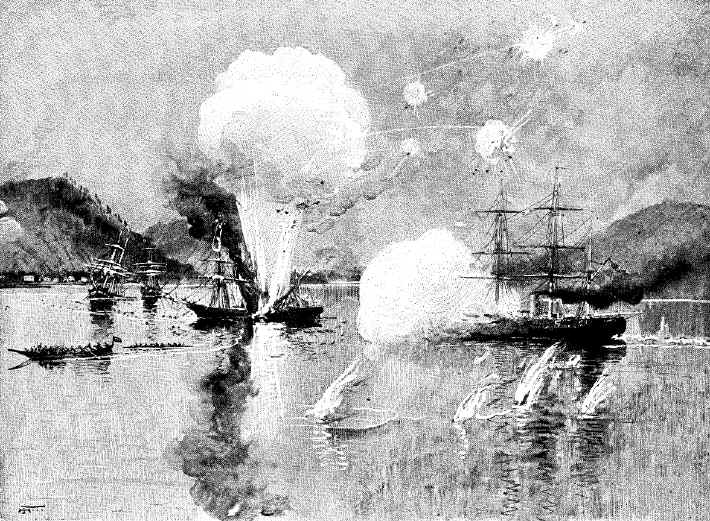
Wyoming sinking the Japanese Lancefield

Wyoming grounded in uncharted waters shortly after she made one run past the forts. The Japanese steamer, in the meantime, had slipped her cable and headed directly for Wyoming —possibly to attempt a boarding. Wyoming, however, managed to work free of the mud and then unleashed her 11-inch Dahlgren guns on the enemy ship, hulling her and damaging her severely. Two well-directed shots exploded her boilers and, as she began to sink, her crew abandoned the ship.

Wyoming then passed the bark and the brig, firing into them steadily and methodically. Some shells were "overs" and landed in the town. As McDougal wrote in his report to Secretary of the Navy Gideon Welles on July 23, "the punishment inflicted and in store for him will, I trust, teach him a lesson that will not soon be forgotten."

After having been under fire for a little over an hour, Wyoming returned to Yokohama. She had been hulled 11 times, with considerable damage to her smokestack and rigging. Her casualties had been comparatively light: four men killed and seven wounded—one of whom later died. Significantly, Wyoming had been the first foreign warship to take the offensive to uphold the post-sakoku, bakumatsu-era "opening" of Japan to foreign powers.

The two Japanese steamers sunk by Wyoming were raised again by Chōshū in 1864 and attached to the harbor of Hagi. The battle did not deter the Chōshū clan, and the shore batteries remained intact. The shelling of foreign ships continued. Foreign powers would later combine into a powerful fleet in 1864 in order to conduct the Shimonoseki Campaign, with successful results.
