= Andrew Doyle (artist) =

Irish painter, engraver, and farmer

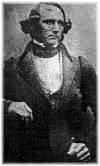
- Born: November 1774; Dublin, Ireland
- Died: 2 September 1841 (aged 66); Ulitedinburra Lodge, Sackville Reach, Sydney, Australia
- Resting place: Ulitedinburra Lodge
- Known for: Painting, engraving
- Spouse: Sophia Isabella Norris

Andrew Doyle (c 1774–1841) was an Irish painter, engraver, and farmer. He was exiled for life to Australia in 1802 after being found in possession of a watermark of the Bank of Ireland, used to forge banknotes.

== Early life and exile ==
Andrew Doyle was born around November 1774 in Dublin, Ireland. He was the son of Bartholomew Doyle and Bridget (née) Nugent. Doyle was baptised in St Catherine's Church, Meath Street on 29 November 1774. He studied drawing under William Waldron, the Master of the Royal Dublin Society's School of Ornamental Drawing.

He married Sophia Isabella Norris around 1792. Sophia was a Protestant, which led to Doyle converting upon their marriage. Sophia's mother's maiden name is believed to be Jouanier, and that she was of French Huguenot descent. The couple had three children in Ireland, Cyrus Matthew born on 27 November 1792 or 1793, Louisa born 1795 and Edmund on 16 December 1799. Doyle trained to become a printer by serving as an apprentice with textile printing and calico manufacturing companies, O’Brien, Comerford and Clarke, in Palmerstown, Dublin. After this he began to trade as an engraver and calico printer himself.

In the late 1790s Andrew spent a number of periods in jail, for unknown crimes, with some sources claiming that it may have been relating to the Irish Rebellion of 1798 and others refuting it. Doyle was convicted for possession of a forged bank note in 1801 along with his brother James, resulting in him being exiled to Australia, being detained at Newgate Prison, Dublin before being transported. They were transported on the ship 'Rolla', leaving Ireland on 4 November 1802.

Doyle arrived, with his wife, on 12 May 1803 along with their four children. The name of Andrew's fourth child is unknown, and is believed to have died in infancy. The family initially lived in Sydney, and later Toongabbie. Doyle received a pardon in 1806, enabling him to buy land on the Hawkesbury River in 1808 on which he built Ulitedinburra Lodge.

== Career ==
In 1803 Doyle was engaged to draw the native shrubs of the colony for Sir Joseph Banks by Governor Philip Gidley King. The State Library of New South Wales holds his watercolour entitled 'Rock Lily' from circa 1820. He gifted Mrs King with a yard of ribbon painted with wildflowers. Doyle served as both a magistrate and a constable.

== Later life and family ==
The couple had two more daughters, Emma Maria, born on 10 April 1804, and Sophia Isabella, born 25 September 1806 at Toongabbie farm. Doyle's sons, John Francis, was born at Ulitedinburra Lodge on 18 January 1809, and John George on 10 November 1811, both went on to become farmers and horse breeders. The wider family were also involved in farming and rearing horses. Doyle died on 2 September 1841 at his home, after a second bout of apoplexy.
