= Peter McDougall (physician) =

Scottish physician and naturalist

Peter McDougall (18 January 1777 – 14 April 1814) was a Scottish physician and naturalist who was the discoverer of the roseate tern (Sterna dougalli).

== Early life ==
McDougall was the third child of Alexander McDougall, a merchant, and Mary Jeffray. He was born on 18 January 1777 and was brought up in the area of Kilsyth. In 1789 he was matriculated at University of Glasgow starting to study humanity and he graduated in 1802 as a M.D. His uncle, James Jeffray, was Professor of Anatomy at the university and greatly encouraged his nephew's studies.

== Medical practice ==
McDougall set up a medical practice in Glasgow in partnership with another physician with the surname Barrie and this lasted from 1804 until 1809. McDougall was then appointed as a surgeon at the new Glasgow Royal Infirmary but his licence to practise was not renewed in 1810 and he returned to general practice on his own. During this time he lived in the area of Glasgow to the south of George Square.

== Natural history and the discovery of the roseate tern ==
McDougall took up collecting natural history objects in his leisure time, sometimes buying them or exchanging specimens with other collectors. He also occasionally assisted the Director of the Hunterian Museum in Glasgow, Captain James Laskey, in its Anatomy Department, as well as taking an interest in its collection of zoological specimens. On 24 July 1812 McDougall and two friends were on Great Cumbrae in the Firth of Clyde and McDougall reported that he was hardly able to walk around because of the large number of terns nesting of the ground. As the adults flew close to McDougall and his friends to defend their eggs, one of McDougall's companions shot one and it fell close to McDougall. When McDougall picked it up he noted that it looked different from the common terns (Sterna hirundo) he was familiar with, so he requested that his friends shoot some more. As his companions tried to obtain more specimens McDougall studied the terns. He noted that:

"The new species was discerned by the comparative shortness of the wing, whiteness of plumage, and by elegance and comparative slowness of motion, sweeping along or resting in the air almost immovable, like some species of Hawk, and from its size being considerable smaller than that of Sterna hirundo."

It is likely that a second as yet to be described species of tern, the Arctic tern (Sterna paradisea) was also present on Great Cumbrae at that time but this was not recognised as distinct from the common tern until 1819.

Captain Laskey, of the Hunterian Museum, was acquainted with George Montagu, sharing an interest in Conchology and both being members of the Wernerian society, and he was quick to inform Montagu of his friend's discovery of a species new to the avifauna of Britain and arranged for one of the specimens to be sent to Montagu. Montagu published a formal description in 1813 and named the new species Sterna Dougallii acknowledging McDougall's recognition of the new species and his generous provision of the specimen.

== Death ==
McDougall died less than a year after the description of the roseate tern, catching a fever in the course of his work as a doctor. This may have been typhus and he died on 14 April 1814. He was buried in the Ingram Street Cemetery but his grave has since been lost. On his death his natural history collection was put up for sale.
