= USS McDougal (DD-358) =

Porter-class destroyer

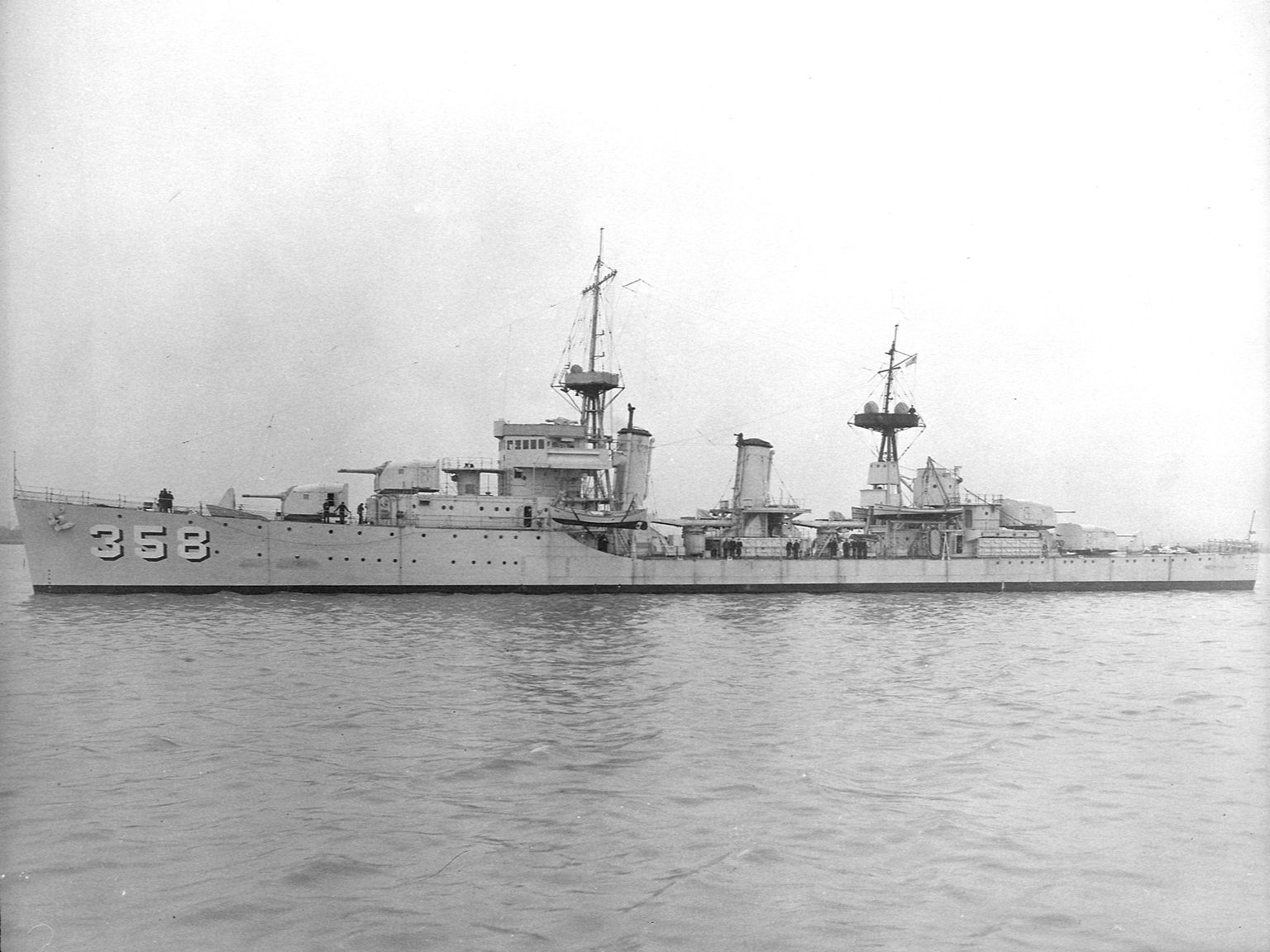
- USS McDougal on 3 March 1937

History

United States
- Name: USS McDougal
- Namesake: Rear Admiral David McDougal
- Builder: New York Shipbuilding Corporation
- Laid down: 18 December 1933
- Launched: 17 July 1936
- Commissioned: 23 December 1936
- Decommissioned: 24 June 1946
- Stricken: 15 August 1949
- Fate: Sold 2 August 1949

General characteristics
- Class & type: Porter-class destroyer
- Displacement: 1,850 tons, 2,597 tons full
- Length: 381 ft 1 in (116.15 m)
- Beam: 36 ft 11 in (11.25 m)
- Draught: 10 ft 4 in (3.15 m)
- Propulsion: 50,000 shp (37,285 kW); Geared Turbines, 2 screws
- Speed: 37 knots (69 km/h)
- Range: 6,500 nm@ 12 knots (12,000 km@ 22 km/h)
- Complement: 194 officers and enlisted
- Armament: As Built: 1 × Mk33 Gun Fire Control System, 8 × 5"(127mm)/38cal SP (4x2), 8 × 1.1" (28mm) AA (2x4), 8 × 21"(533mm) T Tubes (2x4)

The second USS McDougal (DD-358/AG-126) was a Porter-class destroyer in the United States Navy. She was named after Rear Admiral David Stockton McDougal.

McDougal was laid down by New York Shipbuilding Corporation, Camden, New Jersey, 18 December 1933; launched 17 July 1936; sponsored by Miss Caroline McDougal Neilson; and commissioned 23 December 1936.

== Pre World War II service ==
After shakedown, McDougal operated directly under the Office of the Chief of Naval Operations until mid-1937, when she steamed to the Pacific for duty with the Scouting Force and later the Battle Force. Operating out of San Diego, California, she served as flagship for Destroyer Squadron 9. As a heavily armed destroyer leader, she took part in type-training, readiness cruises, and battle problems in the eastern Pacific and in the Caribbean operating area.

McDougal returned to the Atlantic coast with her division in the spring of 1941 to operate along the east coast. Between 5 and 7 August she escorted Augusta carrying President Franklin D. Roosevelt to Placentia Bay, Newfoundland, where, from 9 to 12 August, he met British Prime Minister Winston Churchill for the first time to discuss the menace of the Axis Powers and to formulate "common principles" for peace in the postwar world. On 10 August McDougal transported President Roosevelt to and from HMS Prince of Wales during the only meeting of the two leaders on board the battleship. The President and the Prime Minister completed formulation of the eight-point declaration, embodied in the Atlantic Charter, 12 August; thence, both British and American ships departed NS Argentia later that day. McDougal screened Augusta to the coast of Maine 14 August before resuming operation along the eastern seaboard.

== South Atlantic patrol ==
Assigned to convoy escort duty in the South Atlantic, McDougal steamed for Cape Town, South Africa, from the Caribbean early in December. While battling heavy seas off Cape of Good Hope, she received news of the Japanese attack on Pearl Harbor. She returned to Trinidad 30 December; thence, she departed for patrol duty off the South American coast 18 January 1942. During the next several months she carried out patrol and escort duty between Brazilian and Caribbean ports; and, following overhaul at Charleston, South Carolina during July and August, she cruised via Caribbean ports to the Panama Canal where she arrived 31 August.

== Pacific Service ==
Assigned to the Southeast Pacific Force, McDougal began patrol duty along the Pacific coast of Latin America 7 September. During the next 2 years she cruised out of Balboa, Panama Canal Zone, north to Nicaragua and south to the Straits of Magellan. She patrolled the southeast Pacific westward to the Galápagos and Juan Fernández Islands and touched coastal ports in Ecuador, Peru, and Chile. She returned to New York 4 September 1944.

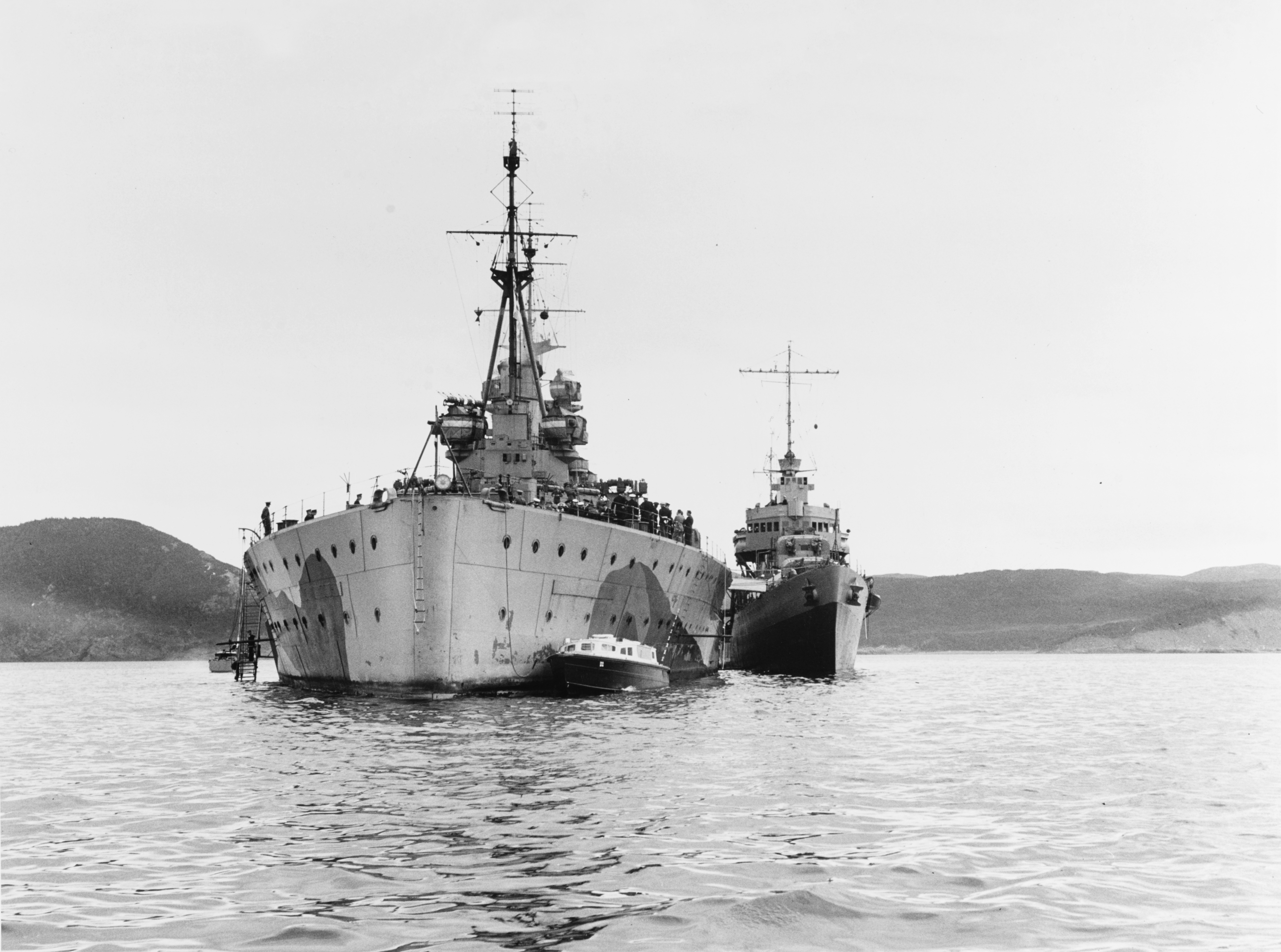
USS McDougal alongside HMS Prince of Wales, to transfer President Franklin D. Roosevelt to the British battleship for the Atlantic Charter meeting with Prime Minister Winston Churchill.

== Return to Atlantic ==
Resuming convoy escort duty 12 September 1944, McDougal sailed for the United Kingdom in the screen of convoy CU 39. During the next 6 months she made four round trips between New York and British ports; and, after arriving New York 5 March 1945 with ships of UC 57, she sailed the same day for overhaul at Charleston.

== Post World War II and fate ==
She cruised to Casco Bay 11 to 15 September and began support duty with the Operational Development Force, Atlantic Fleet (TF 69). Reclassified AG-126 on 17 September, she carried out experimental operations helping to improve naval gunnery and radar. Her duties during the remainder of 1945 sent her to Boston, Newport, and Norfolk. She arrived in Boston 15 December, thence resumed operations out of Norfolk 29 March 1946.

She steamed to New York 15 to 16 June and decommissioned at Tompkinsville, Staten Island, 24 June 1946.

Assigned to duty as a training ship for the Naval Reserve, McDougal was placed in service 13 January 1947. She operated under control of the 3d Naval District while based at Brooklyn. She was placed out of service 8 March 1949 and sold to the H. H. Buncher Company, Pittsburgh, Pennsylvania, 2 August. Her name was struck from the Navy List 15 August, and she was removed from naval custody 22 September 1949. McDougal did not earn any battle stars during World War II.
