= Michael Doyle (hairdresser) =

Irish hairdresser

Michael Doyle (born in Ferrybank, Waterford) is an Irish hairdresser and creative director of Peter Mark at Stephen's Green.

== Early life ==
The son of Peter and Margaret ("Peggie") Doyle (née Mooney), Doyle grew up in the Ferrybank suburb of Waterford, Ireland with four sisters and a brother. At the age of 11, he attended the local De La Salle College until receiving his leaving certificate at the age of 16. His mother died during his final year of secondary school, after which he decided to move to Germany for a year instead of attending art college. He returned home to pursue a career in hairdressing and worked for hair specialist, Ollie Bible, at George's Street in Waterford for three years before working in the UK for a time.

== Career ==
Doyle began work at Peter Marks in 1979 and continued to work there for the next 22 years. As of 2011, Doyle lives in Dublin and is Peter Marks creative director, based at the company's Stephen's Green salon. Recent work has included acting as hair stylist for Aoife Hannon, who represented Ireland in Miss Universe 2011. Other celebrity clients include Caprice, Jodie Kidd, Claudine Palmer, Tyra Banks and Andrea Roche. He has worked as an educator for L'Oriel for about twelve years.

=== Accolades ===
Doyle has received several awards, including the Raidió Teilifís Éireann's 'Off the Rails' Hairdresser of the Year and an Irish Hairdressing Federation Hall of Fame Icon Award for promoting the industry through the years.

Doyle represented Ireland at the Royal Albert Hall for the 2011 International Visionary Awards.
