= Thomas Doyle =

Thomas, Tommy or Tom Doyle may refer to:

== Politicians ==
- Thomas Doyle (Australian politician) (1885–1951), New South Wales politician
- Thomas Doyle (Canadian politician) (1932–2007), politician in Newfoundland, Canada
- Thomas A. Doyle (Illinois politician) (1886–1935), U.S. Representative from Illinois
- Thomas A. Doyle (mayor) (1827–1886), Mayor of Providence, Rhode Island
- Tom Doyle (Nebraska politician) (1931–2022), Nebraska politician and county official
- Thomas Francis Doyle (1893–1968), member of the New Zealand Legislative Council
- Thomas H. Doyle (1863–1949), Oklahoma politician and judge

== Sportspeople ==
- Tommy Doyle (Tipperary hurler) (1915–1988), Irish hurler
- Tommy Doyle (footballer, born 1916) (1916–1974), Scottish footballer, see List of Rochdale A.F.C. players (25–99 appearances)
- A. Thomas Doyle (1917–1989), American racehorse trainer
- Tom Doyle (rugby union) (born 1944), Irish rugby union player
- Tommy Doyle (Gaelic footballer) (born 1956), played for Kerry
- Tom Doyle (born 1992), New Zealand footballer
- Tommy Doyle (Westmeath hurler) (born 1993), Irish hurler
- Tommy Doyle (baseball) (born 1996), American baseball player
- Tommy Doyle (American football) (born 1998), American football offensive lineman
- Thomas Doyle (rugby league) (born 1999), English rugby league
- Tommy Doyle (English footballer) (born 2001)

== Priests ==
- Thomas Doyle (priest) (1793–1879), English Roman Catholic priest
- Thomas P. Doyle (born 1944), American Catholic priest
