= Graham Doyle =

Irish soccer player

Personal information
- Date of birth: 19 January 1974 (age 52)
- Place of birth: Dublin, Ireland
- Positions: Defender; midfielder

Senior career*
Years	Team	Apps	(Gls)
1996–1998	Home Farm	45	(20)
1998–1999	Shelbourne	7	(0)
1999–2001	Bohemians	55	(8)
1999	→ Crusaders (loan)	7	(1)
2001	→ Newry Town (loan)	10	(4)
2001–2002	Dublin City	35	(12)
2002–2006	Monaghan United	68	(20)
- * Club domestic league appearances and goals

Graham Doyle (born 19 January 1974) is an Irish public servant and former soccer player, who was born in Dublin.

== Career ==
Doyle started his League of Ireland football career with Home Farm Everton in 1996. He had previously played for Cherry Orchard F.C. where he won the FAI Junior Cup, the Leinster Junior Cup and the Leinster Senior League in 1994–95. He played 45 league games for Home Farm Everton F.C., scoring 20 goals before moving on to Shelbourne. Roddy Collins signed him for Bohemians in December 1998 and he scored his first goals for the club a month later with a brace in a 4-0 FAI Cup win over Waterford United. He played 55 league games for Bohemians scoring 8 goals. He was loaned out to Crusaders during the 1999/2000 season to recover from injury but returned in time to be part of Bohs' squad for the 2000 FAI Cup Final. He was a member of the 2001 double winning Bohemians squad.

A strong central defender or midfielder with an eye for goal, he later had spells at Dublin City where he played 35 league games and scored 12 goals and Monaghan United where he played 68 league games and scored 20 goals.

Doyle managed Dublin side Moyle Park F.C. from 2006 to 2008, and spent the 2008-09 as assistant manager of Monaghan United. He is the Director of Coaching at Dunboyne AFC.

Outside of football, Doyle is a public servant. He is a Deputy Commissioner and the Head of Corporate Affairs, Media and Communications with the Data Protection Commissioner. He was formerly Head of Communications and Research at the Garda Síochána Ombudsman Commission (GSOC) and the Student Universal Support Ireland (SUSI).
