= Martin Doyle =

Martin Doyle may refer to:

- Martin Doyle (convict) (died 1861), last person executed for attempted murder in the United Kingdom
- Martin Doyle (ecologist) (born 1973), American ecologist
- Martin Doyle (VC) (1891–1940), Irish member of the British Army and recipient of the Victoria Cross
- Martin Doyle (wrestler) (born 1958), Irish Olympic wrestler
- William Hickey (writer) (1787–1875), also known as Martin Doyle, Irish writer and philanthropist
