= David McDougall (footballer) =

Scottish footballer

Personal information
- Full name: David Brunton McDougall
- Date of birth: 1894
- Place of birth: Leith, Scotland
- Date of death: 18 August 1918 (aged 24)
- Place of death: West Flanders, Belgium
- Position: Inside left

Senior career*
Years	Team	Apps	(Gls)
–1914	Bonnyrigg Rose Athletic		
1914–1917	St Bernard's	16	(10)
1917–1918	Hibernian	8	(0)
- * Club domestic league appearances and goals

David Brunton McDougall (1894 – 18 August 1918) was a Scottish professional footballer who played as an inside left in the Scottish League for St Bernard's.

== Personal life ==
McDougall served as a corporal in the King's Own Scottish Borderers during the First World War and was killed in action in Belgium on 18 August 1918. He is commemorated on the Ploegsteert Memorial.
