= John McDougall (cricketer) =

Scottish cricketer

Personal information
- Full name: John Robson McDougall
- Born: 2 February 1886; Galashiels, Selkirkshire, Scotland
- Died: 13 May 1947 (aged 61); Ayr, Ayrshire, Scotland
- Batting: Right-handed
- Role: Wicket-keeper

Domestic team information
- Years: Team
- 1912: Scotland

Career statistics
Competition	First-class
Matches	1
Runs scored	15
Batting average	7.50
100s/50s	–/–
Top score	12
Catches/stumpings	1/–
- Source: Cricinfo, 11 July 2022

John Robson McDougall (2 March 1886 — 1 April 1971) was a Scottish first-class cricketer.

The son of Thomas McDougall, he was born at Galashiels in March 1886. A club cricketer for Gala Cricket Club, McDougall made a single appearance in first-class cricket for Scotland against Ireland at Dublin in 1912. Playing as a wicket-keeper in the Scottish side, he was dismissed in the Scotland first innings for 12 runs by Robert Gregory, while in their second innings he was dismissed for 3 runs by William Harrington. As wicket-keeper, he took one catch, with Scotland winning the match by the narrow margin of 3 runs. By profession, McDougall was a tailor's merchant. He died at Ayr in April 1971, having been suffering from broncial pneumonia.
