= John MacDougall (Royal Navy officer) =

Scottish Royal Navy vice admiral

Vice-Admiral Sir John MacDougall KCB
- Born: 1790; Edinburgh, Scotland
- Died: 12 April 1865 (aged 74–75); Dunollie, Argyll, Scotland
- Occupation: Royal Navy officer

Sir John MacDougall KCB (1790 – 12 April 1865) was a Scottish Royal Navy vice admiral.

== Biography ==
MacDougall was born in 1790, the second son of Patrick MacDougall, a lawyer and Writer to the Signet in Edinburgh, and his wife Louisa Maxwell Campbell, the youngest daughter of John Campbell of Achallader in Argyll. In 1798, the family moved to Dunollie House near Oban when Patrick succeeded his father as 24th Chief of Clan MacDougall.

John MacDougall entered the Navy as a midshipman in December 1802, on board the sloop Cruiser, actively employed on the north coast of France through 1803. In 1804 he was in the Doris frigate with his cousin, Patrick Campbell. When the Doris was burnt, January 1805, he was appointed to the Hero, in which he was present in the action off Cape Finisterre, 22 July 1805. He was afterwards again with Patrick Campbell in the Chiffonne, and in the Unité from June 1806 to November 1809, during which time he was repeatedly engaged in actions in the Adriatic. On 25 November 1809 he was promoted by Lord Collingwood to be lieutenant of the Ville de Paris, a promotion confirmed by the Admiralty on 3 January 1810. In May 1811 he was again appointed to the Unité, which under the command of Captain Chamberlayne still formed part of the squadron in the Adriatic. The service was very severe, and MacDougall was, as before, frequently engaged in boat actions. In November 1811 he was in command of a prize to take her to Malta, when he fell in with three French ships of war. 'With a judgment and zeal which did him infinite credit' he returned to communicate his intelligence to the senior officer, Captain Murray Maxwell, with the result that two of the French ships were captured.

John MacDougall's elder brother, Alexander, captain in the 5th regiment of foot, was killed in 1812, at the storming of Ciudad Rodrigo in Spain. Towards the end of 1812 John returned to Scotland on compassionate leave.

In 1814 he was in the Leander on the coast of North America; and in 1816 was a lieutenant of the Superb with Captain Ekins, at the bombardment of Algiers, on 27 August. In 1819 he was flag-lieutenant to Rear-admiral Donald Campbell in the West Indies, and was officially thanked by the king of Denmark, through the lords of the admiralty, for his conduct in saving the crew of a Danish ship wrecked in a hurricane at Saint Thomas. He was promoted to be commander on 9 February 1820.

In 1828, while back in Argyll, John MacDougall assumed responsibility for the management of the Baleveolan Estate on the Island of Lismore which his infant nephew, Donald Campbell, the son of his eldest sister Ann Colina MacDougall, had inherited on the sudden death of his father. His youngest brother, Allan Duncan MacDougall, took over as factor of Baleveolan when John returned to naval service.

From 1833 to 1835 John commanded the Nimrod on the coast of Portugal, and was promoted to be captain 16 August 1836. In February 1845 he commissioned the Vulture, paddle-wheel frigate, for the East India station, and in April 1847, being then senior officer at Hong Kong, escorted the governor, Sir John Francis Davis, with a strong body of troops up the river to Canton, capturing the Bogue forts on the way, spiking upwards of five hundred guns and destroying the ammunition (Bulletins of State Intelligence, 1847, p. 262). It would appear that the Chinese were taken unawares, and that the forts were not garrisoned to their proper strength.

MacDougall returned to Scotland in 1848. He had no farther service, but was promoted to be rear-admiral on 12 May 1857; was nominated a K.C.B. on 10 November 1862; attained the rank of vice-admiral 3 November 1863; and died at Dunollie on 12 April 1865. He married in 1826 Elizabeth Sophia, only daughter of Commander Charles Sheldon Timins of the Royal Navy, and had issue, among others, Colonel Charles Allan, the succeeding laird of Dunollie, Patrick Charles Campbell, who died a commander in the navy in 1861, and Somerled, a naval captain.
