= William McDougall =

William McDougall may refer to:

- William McDougall (Ontario politician) (1822–1905), Canadian lawyer and politician from Ontario
- William McDougall (Nova Scotia politician) (1816–1886), Canadian shipbuilder and politician from Nova Scotia
- William McDougall (Quebec politician) (1831–1886), Canadian lawyer, judge and politician from Quebec
- William McDougall (psychologist) (1871–1938), British psychologist and author
- William Currie McDougall (1840-1920) Scottish minister and poet, central to the Coatbridge Free Church Scandal
- Bill McDougall (born 1966), Canadian ice hockey player

== See also ==
- William MacDougall (born 1944), Canadian politician
- William Dugald MacDougall, United States Navy admiral|
- William MacDougal, supposed full name of Groundskeeper Willie in The Simpsons television show
