= Phil Doyle =

Australian writer, poet and journalist

Phil Doyle (born 1967) is an Australian writer, poet and journalist.

Doyle's debut play After The Rain, was performed at Melbourne's Organ Factory Theatre. In 1998 mergemedia released his novella A Book About Things That Didn't Happen. In 1999 he was the ACT finalist in Radio JJJ's Raw Comedy competition.

Publications that have featured Doyle's work include: Overland, dB, AWU NSW, The Big Issue magazines, and The Age.
