= Jerry Doyle (disambiguation) =

Jerry Doyle (1956–2016) was an American radio host, conservative political commentator, and television actor.

Jerry or Gerry Doyle may also refer to:

- Jerry Doyle (politician) (born 1941), Canadian politician, Alberta NDP MLA Yellowhead
- Gerry Doyle (hurler), Irish hurler
- Gerry Doyle (Irish footballer) (1911–1990), Irish footballer and football manager
- Gerry Doyle (Scottish footballer) (born 1965), Scottish footballer

== See also ==
- Jeremy Doyle (1983–2011), Australian wheelchair basketball player
- Jeremiah Doyle (1849–1909), Irish-born Catholic bishop
