= Œuilly =

Œuilly may refer to the following places in France:

- Œuilly, Aisne, a commune in the department of Aisne
- Œuilly, Marne, a commune in the department of Marne
