= Sarah Doyle (poet) =

British poet, essayist and tutor

- Education: Royal Holloway, University of London
- Occupations: Poet, critic
- Writing career
- Language: English
- Genres: Poetry; Creative nonfiction
- Notable work: Something so wild and new in this feeling
- Notable awards: Wolverhampton Literature Festival (WoLF) Poetry Competition, 2019; William Blake Poetry Prize, 2015
- Website: sarahdoyle.co.uk/

Sarah Doyle is a London-based poet, and freelance poetry mentor and critique provider. In 2018, she was highly commended in both the Ginkgo Prize for Ecopoetry and the Forward Prizes.

== Education ==
Doyle has an MA in Creative Writing from Royal Holloway, University of London. In 2019, she joined Birmingham City University as a doctoral researcher studying the poetics of meteorology.

== Career ==
Doyle has been the Pre-Raphaelite Society's Poet-in-Residence, has published poetry in numerous journals, and has had work performed on radio, illustrated, and set to music. Her essay on meteorological Romantic poetry was a joint runner-up in the Keats-Shelley Essay Prize 2020.

Doyle's poems 'Unholy' and 'The Cheater' placed in the William Blake Poetry Prize 2015, which was judged by the poet George Szirtes. The former, which "comments on the current refugee situation in striking resounding terms", was declared the winner, and the latter, "about infidelity in a marriage", was a runner-up. In 2023, her poems 'Damage' and 'Prevailing Conditions' placed in the year's Ver Poets Open Poetry Competition, judged by the poet Julia Webb. The former was the winning poem and the latter was commended. Another of Doyle's poems, 'On finding a cow's jawbone in my city garden', noted as "startling, evocative [and] extremely formally skilful", was awarded first prize in the inaugural Kathryn Bevis Memorial Poetry Prize in 2025.

Following the publication of a co-authored pamphlet Dreaming Spheres: Poems of the Solar System in 2014, Doyle co-edited the "enthralling and difficult" anthology titled Humanagerie, published in 2018 (both with poet Allen Ashley). Humanagerie was then shortlisted for a British Fantasy Award in 2019.

Doyle has published two solo poetry pamphlets, both with V. Press, in 2021 and 2023. Something so wild and new in this feeling, her first, is an "audacious and brilliantly conceived" pamphlet of collage poems inspired by Dorothy Wordsworth's journals. A review noted that Doyle's "re-imaginings are astoundingly successful". The pamphlet was conceived while Doyle was still at Birmingham City University, and she has mentioned that the poems in her pamphlet "emerged from [her] research, but were completely unanticipated". Annie Fisher, writing for Sphinx Review, praised Doyle for "skilfully re-presenting" extracts from Dorothy Wordsworth's journals.

Doyle's second pamphlet, (m)othersongs, was published in 2023. Both her pamphlets were Atrium's featured publications––Something so wild and new in this feeling in March 2021, and (m)othersongs in March–April 2024.

In 2025, Canongate Books lodged a legal complaint against The Sunday Times. This followed the publication of a review of Scottish poet Len Pennie's second collection poyums annaw (Canongate, 2025) in the paper, in which the reviewer Graeme Richardson noted the similarities between one of Pennie's poems, 'Good Girl', and Doyle's "excellent" Keats-Shelley Prize 2019 runner-up poem 'Laika'. In his commentary on the situation, poet Rory Waterman praised Doyle's poem for "the economy and [her] ear for connotation". Doyle later wrote about her experience following the events.

== Books ==
Pamphlets

- (m)othersongs (V. Press, 2023) ISBN 9781739883867
- Something so wild and new in this feeling (V. Press, 2021) ISBN 9781838048815
- With Allen Ashley: Dreaming Spheres: Poems of the Solar System (PS Publishing, 2014) ISBN 9781848638075

As editor (with Allen Ashley)

- Humanagerie (Eibonvale Publishing, 2018) ISBN 9781908125811

== Awards ==
- 2015: Winner, William Blake Poetry Prize, for 'Unholy'
- 2018: Highly commended, Ginkgo Prize for Ecopoetry, for 'Night Shifts in the Nature Factory'
- 2018: Highly commended, Forward Prize for Best Single Poem, for 'The woman who married an alchemist'
- 2019: Winner, Wolverhampton Literature Festival (WoLF) poetry competition 2019, for 'On holding an ammonite'
- 2020: Runner-up, The Keats-Shelley (Poetry) Prize 2019, for 'Laika'
- 2021: Highly commended, The Keats-Shelley (Essay) Prize 2020, for "'Four Seasons Fill the Measure of the Year': Romantic Meteorology"
- 2022: Longlisted, National Poetry Competition
- 2023: Highly commended, Ginkgo Prize for Ecopoetry 2022, for 'Sea Gooseberries'
- 2023: 1st prize, Ver Poets Open Poetry Competition 2023, for 'Damage'
- 2025: 1st prize, Kathryn Bevis Memorial Poetry Prize 2025, for 'On finding a cow's jawbone in my city garden'.
