= David McDougal =

American admiral (1809–1882)

David Stockton McDougal
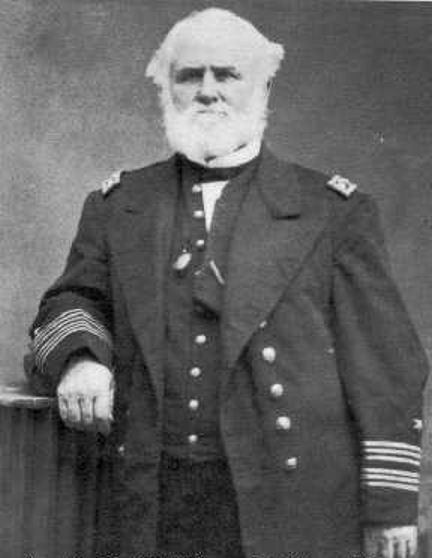
- David McDougal, in captain's uniform, c. 1864-1871
- Born: September 27, 1809; Ohio, U.S.
- Died: August 7, 1882 (aged 72); San Francisco, California, U.S.
- Burial place: Mountain View Cemetery, Oakland, California
- Military career
- Allegiance: United States of America
- Branch: United States Navy
- Service years: 1828–1871
- Rank: Rear admiral
- Commands: USS Warren; USS John Hancock; USS Wyoming; South Pacific Squadron
- Conflicts: Mexican–American War; Mosquito Fleet Campaign; Blockade of Veracruz; Siege of Veracruz; Shimonoseki campaign; Battle of Shimonoseki Straits

David Stockton McDougal (September 27, 1809 – August 7, 1882) was an officer in the United States Navy during the American Civil War most noted for his leadership during a naval battle off of Japan.

== Biography ==
Born in Ohio, McDougal was appointed as a midshipman on April 1, 1828. During the next three decades, he served in the Mediterranean, West Indian, and Home Squadrons as well as on the Great Lakes in Michigan. While serving in the USS Mississippi from 1846 to 1848, during the Mexican–American War, McDougal participated in Commodore Matthew C. Perry's Mosquito Fleet Campaign and the blockade and siege of Veracruz. He later commanded the sloop-of-war USS Warren from 1854 to 1856, the steam tug USS John Hancock in 1856, and the screw sloop USS Wyoming from 1861 to 1864, in which he cruised in the Pacific protecting American merchant ships from pirates and Confederate raiders. The Wyoming first patrolled off Lower California, then headed south to operate in South American waters, before heading to the Far East.

Because of an earlier attack on the American merchant steamer Pembroke, Wyoming boldly entered the Straits of Shimonoseki, and on July 16, 1863, in the Battle of Shimonoseki Straits engaged shore batteries and three ships of Prince Mori, clan chieftain of the Chōshū. During an hour's brisk action, McDougal sank two ships and heavily damaged another, then pounded enemy shore guns.

After searching for Confederate raiders elsewhere in the Far East, Commander McDougal finally sailed Wyoming to an overdue overhaul in the Philadelphia Navy Yard in 1864; having completed a circumnavigation of the globe. Despite needing extensive repairs McDougall and Wyoming were ordered back to sea to search for the CSS Florida before being forced to return for repairs. On December 23, 1869, McDougal assumed command of the South Pacific Squadron.

Commander McDougal was promoted to captain, on the active list, on March 2, 1864. He was placed on the retired list on September 27, 1871, and appointed rear admiral on August 24, 1873. He died at San Francisco, California, and is buried at Mountain View Cemetery, Oakland, California.

== Namesakes ==
Two ships have been named USS McDougal for him.
