= Doyle (disambiguation) =

Doyle is a surname.

Doyle may also refer to:

== Given name ==
- Doyle Bramhall, American musician
- Doyle Bramhall II, American musician, son of Doyle Bramhall
- Doyle Brunson, American poker player
- Doyle P. Royal, American soccer and tennis coach
- Doyle Vaca, Bolivian football (soccer) player
- Doyle Wolfgang von Frankenstein, American musician, guitarist for the Misfits

== Places in the United States ==
- Doyle, California (disambiguation)
- Doyle, Missouri
- Doyle, New York, a hamlet
- Doyle, Tennessee
- Doyle, Texas
- Doyle, West Virginia
- Doyle, Wisconsin
- Doyle Township, Michigan
- Doyle Peak, a mountain in northern Arizona

== Film and television ==
- Allen Francis Doyle, a character on the TV series Angel
- Doyle (Andromeda), a character on the TV series Andromeda

== Music ==
- Doyle (band), an American horror punk/heavy metal band featuring guitarist Doyle Wolfgang von Frankenstein

== Other uses ==
- Doyle New York, an auction house
- USS Doyle (FFG-39), a United States Navy ship, commissioned in 1983
- Doyle Cup, a championship ice hockey trophy

== See also ==
- Doylestown (disambiguation)
- Justice Doyle (disambiguation)
