= Geography of Arizona =

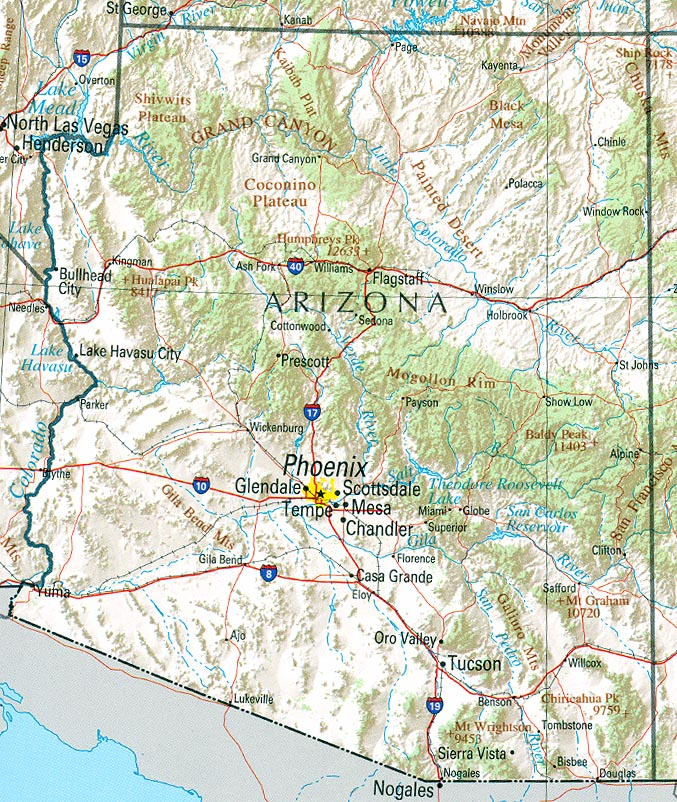

The location of Arizona in the United States

Arizona is a landlocked state situated in the southwestern region of the United States of America. It has a vast and diverse geography famous for its deep canyons, high- and low-elevation deserts, numerous natural rock formations, and volcanic mountain ranges. Arizona shares land borders with Utah to the north, the Mexican state of Sonora to the south, New Mexico to the east, and Nevada to the northwest, as well as water borders with California and the Mexican state of Baja California to the southwest along the Colorado River. Arizona is also one of the Four Corners states and is diagonally adjacent to Colorado.

Arizona has a total area of 113,998 square miles (295,253 km^{2}), making it the sixth largest U.S. state. Of this area, just 0.3% consists of water, which makes Arizona the state with the second lowest percentage of water area (New Mexico is the lowest at 0.2%). Arizona spans about 335 miles (539 km) at its widest and 390 miles (628 km) at its longest, and has an average elevation of about 4,000 feet (1,200 m). The geographic center of Arizona is located in Yavapai County, approximately 55 miles (89 km) east-southeast of the city of Prescott.

== Political geography ==
Arizona municipalities

Arizona is divided into 15 counties, and has 90 incorporated cities and towns. Approximately 60 percent of Arizona residents live in Maricopa County, which had a population of 4,420,568 as of the 2020 Census. Maricopa County ranks fourth among the nation's counties in terms of population, and is more populated than 24 of the U.S. states. The county seat of Maricopa County is Phoenix, which is Arizona's largest city and capital.

The next most populous county is Pima County, which had a 2020 census population of 1,043,433. The county seat of Pima County is Tucson, where nearly all of the population is concentrated. Combined, nearly 80% of Arizona residents live in either Maricopa County or Pima County, even though the two counties make up 16% of Arizona's total area. Because of the high population of Maricopa County and Pima County, both counties are dominant in state politics.

About 15% of Arizona is privately owned, the remaining land consisting primarily of Forest Service, National Park Service, Native American reservations, military institutions, and swaths of wilderness held by the Bureau of Land Management. Arizona is home to 21 federally recognized tribes, which are each semi-autonomous. The large majority are part of the Navajo Nation, which is the largest Native American reservation in terms of population and size. The Navajo Reservation covers all of northeastern Arizona along with portions of New Mexico and Utah, and had a population of 165,158 as of the 2020 census.

== Climate ==
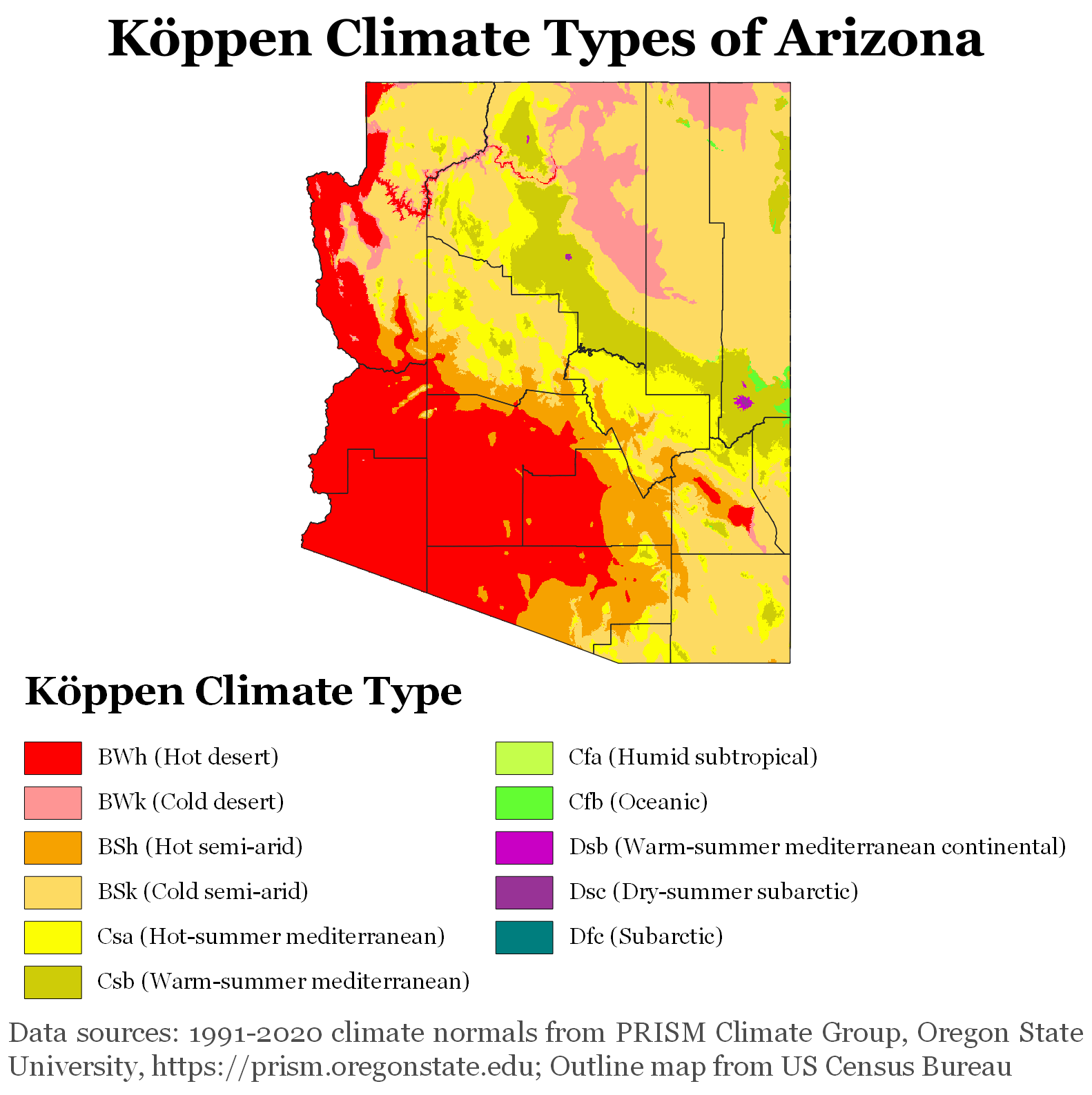
Köppen climate types of Arizona, using 1991–2020 climate normals.

Due to the state's large area and range of elevation, there is a variety of localized climate conditions. Overall, most of Arizona receives little precipitation, and is classified as having either an arid or semi-arid climate. The northern parts of the state and the mountainous areas tend to have cooler climates, while the southwestern parts of the state tend to be warm year round.

=== Rainfall ===
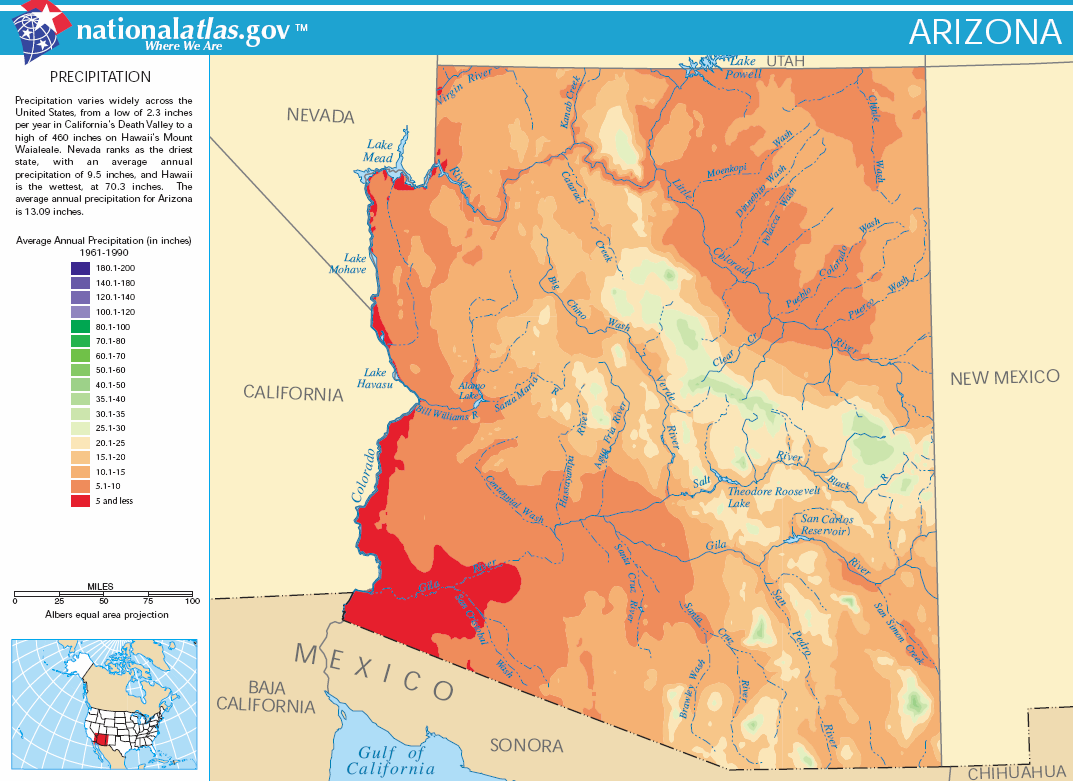
Arizona's average rainfall

Precipitation in Arizona is governed by elevation and the season of year. The peak periods of rainfall are during the early winter, when storm systems from the Pacific Ocean cross the state, and during the summer, when moisture-bearing winds sweep into Arizona from the southeast, which obtain moisture from the Gulf of Mexico. Summer rains tend to occur in the form of thunderstorms, which result from excessive heating of the ground and the lifting of moisture-laden air along mountain ranges. These thunderstorms can cause strong winds, brief periods of blowing dust, and infrequently cause hail. The heaviest precipitation is found in the mountain ranges of central and southeastern Arizona, while the driest conditions are found in the arid regions of southwestern Arizona.

The number of days with measurable precipitation can vary from around 70 in the Flagstaff area to 15 in the Yuma area. The highest elevations of Arizona receive up to 30 inches (760 mm) of precipitation annually, and the southern slopes of the Mogollon Rim and the southeast average between 15 and 20 inches (380 and 510 mm). The driest part of the state is the southwestern region, which receives under 3 inches (76 mm) of rain a year, whilst the northeastern Colorado Plateau is in a rain shadow and receives between 4.5 and 10 inches (114 and 254 mm). Annual average humidity values vary from 55% in Flagstaff to 23% in Yuma. Due to the high temperatures, low humidity, and occurrence of sunshine, Arizona has high rates of evaporation. Average annual lake evaporation varies from about 80 inches (2,000 mm) in the southwestern part of the state to about 50 inches (1,300 mm) in the northeast. During El Niño, the Pacific jet stream enters the U.S. further south of its normal position, making Arizona winters wetter than usual. The opposite phase, La Niña, reinforces the jet streams northern route, making Arizona winters even drier than normal.

==== Snow ====
While the desert parts of Arizona are renowned for their warm climates, snow is not uncommon to portions of Arizona. From November through March, when storm systems from the Pacific Ocean cross the state, heavy snow can accumulate in the mountains of central, northern, and southeastern Arizona. Moderate snow can occur as far south as Nogales, Arizona, which is located on the southern border with Mexico, since it experiences below-freezing nighttime temperatures during the winter.

The rims of the Grand Canyon experience snow during the winter due to their high altitudes. The South Rim of the Grand Canyon, located at an altitude averaging 7,000 feet or 2,100 metres, receives 60 inches or 1.52 metres of snow annually, and the North Rim of the Grand Canyon, located at an altitude over 8,000 feet or 2,400 metres receives 144 inches or 3.66 metres of snow.

=== Temperature ===
Climate data for Arizona
Month	Jan	Feb	Mar	Apr	May	Jun	Jul	Aug	Sep	Oct	Nov	Dec	Year
Record high °F (°C)	90 (32)	100 (38)	112 (44)	113 (45)	121 (49)	128 (53)	127 (53)	126 (52)	123 (51)	116 (47)	102 (39)	92 (33)	128 (53)
Record low °F (°C)	−40 (−40)	−37 (−38)	−27 (−33)	−16 (−27)	4 (−16)	13 (−11)	25 (−4)	20 (−7)	11 (−12)	−9 (−23)	−30 (−34)	−36 (−38)	−40 (−40)
Source: https://www.factmonster.com/math-science/weather/arizona-temperature-extremes

=== Extreme highs ===
Month	Temperature	Date	Location
January	90 °F (32 °C)	January 10, 1956	Gila Bend, Maricopa County
February	100 °F (38 °C)	February 28, 2026	Roll, Yuma County
March	112 °F (44 °C)	March 20, 2026	Martinez Lake and Fort Yuma, Yuma County
April	113 °F (45 °C)	April 25, 1898	Parker, La Paz County
May	121 °F (49 °C)	May 30, 1910	Quartzsite, La Paz County
June	128 °F (53 °C)	June 29, 1994	Lske Havasu City, Mohave County
July	127 °F (53 °C)	July 7, 1905	Parker, La Paz County
August	126 °F (52 °C)	August 6, 1905	Parker, La Paz County
September	123 °F (51 °C)	September 1, 1950	Yuma, Yuma County
October	116 °F (47 °C)	October 5, 1917	Sentinel, Maricopa County
November	102 °F (39 °C)	November 1, 2008	Mesa, Maricopa County
December	92 °F (33 °C)	December 6, 1901	Parker, La Paz County
December	92 °F (33 °C)	December 3, 1958	Bouse, La Paz County

Because of the dry climate and sparse cloud cover throughout the state, temperatures can vary dramatically, from day to night, and from season to season. Parts of Arizona located in the Sonoran Desert have warm daytime temperatures year round, while other parts of the state experience seasonal coldness regularly. The average daily temperatures of Yuma, which is located near Arizona's southwestern corner, range from 43 to 67 °F (6 to 19 °C) in January, and from 81 to 107 °F (27 to 42 °C) in July. In Flagstaff, located in the state's central interior, the average daily temperatures range from 14 to 41 °F (−10 to 5 °C) during January, and from 50 to 81 °F (10 to 27 °C) in July. The record high temperature for Arizona was 128 °F (53 °C), measured in Lake Havasu City on June 29, 1994, and July 5, 2007. The record low temperature for Arizona was -40 °F (-40 °C), measured at Hawley Lake on January 7, 1971.

=== Full statistics for ThreadEx cities ===
Climate data for Flagstaff Pulliam Airport, Arizona (1991–2020 normals, sun 1981–2010, humidity 1961–1990, (Note: Mean monthly maxima and minima (i.e. the expected highest and lowest temperature readings at any point during the year or given month) calculated based on data at said location from 1991 to 2020.) extremes 1898–present) (Note: Official records for Flagstaff were kept at the Weather Bureau in downtown from September 8, 1898 to January 11, 1950, and at Pulliam Airport since January 12, 1950. For more information, see ThreadEx)
Month	Jan	Feb	Mar	Apr	May	Jun	Jul	Aug	Sep	Oct	Nov	Dec	Year
Record high °F (°C)	66 (19)	71 (22)	84 (29)	80 (27)	89 (32)	96 (36)	97 (36)	93 (34)	91 (33)	85 (29)	74 (23)	68 (20)	97 (36)
Mean maximum °F (°C)	56.9 (13.8)	58.9 (14.9)	65.7 (18.7)	72.8 (22.7)	80.5 (26.9)	88.6 (31.4)	90.5 (32.5)	87.4 (30.8)	82.9 (28.3)	75.5 (24.2)	66.9 (19.4)	58.7 (14.8)	91.4 (33.0)
Mean daily maximum °F (°C)	43.4 (6.3)	45.7 (7.6)	52.2 (11.2)	59.2 (15.1)	68.1 (20.1)	79.1 (26.2)	82.0 (27.8)	79.3 (26.3)	74.1 (23.4)	63.6 (17.6)	52.1 (11.2)	43.0 (6.1)	61.8 (16.6)
Daily mean °F (°C)	30.5 (−0.8)	32.8 (0.4)	38.0 (3.3)	43.7 (6.5)	51.3 (10.7)	60.8 (16.0)	66.7 (19.3)	64.9 (18.3)	58.3 (14.6)	47.6 (8.7)	37.5 (3.1)	30.0 (−1.1)	46.8 (8.2)
Mean daily minimum °F (°C)	17.6 (−8.0)	19.6 (−6.9)	23.8 (−4.6)	28.2 (−2.1)	34.6 (1.4)	42.5 (5.8)	51.4 (10.8)	50.6 (10.3)	42.5 (5.8)	31.5 (−0.3)	23.0 (−5.0)	16.9 (−8.4)	31.8 (−0.1)
Mean minimum °F (°C)	−1.4 (−18.6)	2.5 (−16.4)	8.1 (−13.3)	17.1 (−8.3)	24.6 (−4.1)	31.1 (−0.5)	41.4 (5.2)	42.3 (5.7)	30.9 (−0.6)	20.0 (−6.7)	8.1 (−13.3)	−1.4 (−18.6)	−5.5 (−20.8)
Record low °F (°C)	−30 (−34)	−23 (−31)	−16 (−27)	−2 (−19)	7 (−14)	22 (−6)	32 (0)	24 (−4)	20 (−7)	−2 (−19)	−13 (−25)	−23 (−31)	−30 (−34)
Average precipitation inches (mm)	2.05 (52)	2.17 (55)	1.88 (48)	0.89 (23)	0.77 (20)	0.30 (7.6)	2.61 (66)	3.04 (77)	1.84 (47)	1.52 (39)	1.55 (39)	1.90 (48)	20.52 (521)
Average snowfall inches (cm)	20.9 (53)	19.3 (49)	15.6 (40)	5.0 (13)	1.1 (2.8)	0.0 (0.0)	0.0 (0.0)	0.0 (0.0)	0.0 (0.0)	1.5 (3.8)	8.2 (21)	18.5 (47)	90.1 (229)
Average extreme snow depth inches (cm)	10.7 (27)	9.8 (25)	9.3 (24)	3.3 (8.4)	0.3 (0.76)	0.0 (0.0)	0.0 (0.0)	0.0 (0.0)	0.0 (0.0)	0.6 (1.5)	3.7 (9.4)	8.8 (22)	17.4 (44)
Average precipitation days (≥ 0.01 in)	7.0	7.6	6.8	4.9	4.5	2.2	12.0	13.3	7.5	5.3	4.4	6.7	82.2
Average snowy days (≥ 0.1 in)	6.2	6.1	4.7	1.9	0.9	0.0	0.0	0.0	0.0	0.5	2.3	5.7	28.3
Average relative humidity (%)	61.9	59.5	54.9	46.5	39.4	33.6	51.1	58.1	54.7	52.6	56.9	60.6	52.5
Average dew point °F (°C)	15.3 (−9.3)	16.7 (−8.5)	18.7 (−7.4)	20.5 (−6.4)	24.3 (−4.3)	28.4 (−2.0)	44.1 (6.7)	45.9 (7.7)	38.3 (3.5)	27.3 (−2.6)	19.9 (−6.7)	15.1 (−9.4)	26.2 (−3.2)
Mean monthly sunshine hours	231.7	228.6	286.3	321.0	369.5	371.8	324.2	311.9	298.5	282.8	229.3	219.8	3,475.4
Percentage possible sunshine	74	75	77	82	85	86	73	75	80	81	74	72	78
Source 1: NOAA (relative humidity 1961–1990, sun 1973–1990)
Source 2: Weather Atlas (UV)

Climate data for Phoenix Int'l, Arizona (1991–2020 normals, (Note: Mean monthly maxima and minima (i.e. the highest and lowest temperature readings during an entire month or year) calculated based on data at said location from 1991 to 2020.) extremes 1895–present) (Note: Official records for Phoenix kept at downtown August 1895 to September 1953, and at Sky Harbor Int'l since October 1953. For more information see ThreadEx.)
Month	Jan	Feb	Mar	Apr	May	Jun	Jul	Aug	Sep	Oct	Nov	Dec	Year
Record high °F (°C)	88 (31)	92 (33)	105 (41)	105 (41)	114 (46)	122 (50)	121 (49)	118 (48)	117 (47)	113 (45)	99 (37)	88 (31)	122 (50)
Mean maximum °F (°C)	78.2 (25.7)	82.1 (27.8)	90.4 (32.4)	99.0 (37.2)	105.7 (40.9)	112.7 (44.8)	114.6 (45.9)	113.2 (45.1)	108.9 (42.7)	100.7 (38.2)	88.9 (31.6)	77.7 (25.4)	115.7 (46.5)
Mean daily maximum °F (°C)	67.6 (19.8)	70.8 (21.6)	78.1 (25.6)	85.5 (29.7)	94.5 (34.7)	104.2 (40.1)	106.5 (41.4)	105.1 (40.6)	100.4 (38.0)	89.2 (31.8)	76.5 (24.7)	66.2 (19.0)	87.1 (30.6)
Daily mean °F (°C)	56.8 (13.8)	59.9 (15.5)	66.3 (19.1)	73.2 (22.9)	82.0 (27.8)	91.4 (33.0)	95.5 (35.3)	94.4 (34.7)	89.2 (31.8)	77.4 (25.2)	65.1 (18.4)	55.8 (13.2)	75.6 (24.2)
Mean daily minimum °F (°C)	46.0 (7.8)	49.0 (9.4)	54.5 (12.5)	60.8 (16.0)	69.5 (20.8)	78.6 (25.9)	84.5 (29.2)	83.6 (28.7)	78.1 (25.6)	65.6 (18.7)	53.7 (12.1)	45.3 (7.4)	64.1 (17.8)
Mean minimum °F (°C)	36.0 (2.2)	40.0 (4.4)	44.4 (6.9)	50.1 (10.1)	58.4 (14.7)	69.4 (20.8)	74.4 (23.6)	74.2 (23.4)	68.3 (20.2)	53.8 (12.1)	42.0 (5.6)	35.4 (1.9)	33.8 (1.0)
Record low °F (°C)	16 (−9)	24 (−4)	25 (−4)	35 (2)	39 (4)	49 (9)	63 (17)	58 (14)	47 (8)	34 (1)	27 (−3)	22 (−6)	16 (−9)
Average precipitation inches (mm)	0.87 (22)	0.87 (22)	0.83 (21)	0.22 (5.6)	0.13 (3.3)	0.02 (0.51)	0.91 (23)	0.93 (24)	0.57 (14)	0.56 (14)	0.57 (14)	0.74 (19)	7.22 (183)
Average precipitation days (≥ 0.01 in)	3.8	4.1	3.1	1.5	1.0	0.5	3.9	4.6	2.5	2.2	2.2	4.0	33.4
Average relative humidity (%)	50.9	44.4	39.3	27.8	21.9	19.4	31.6	36.2	35.6	36.9	43.8	51.8	36.6
Average dew point °F (°C)	32.4 (0.2)	32.2 (0.1)	32.9 (0.5)	31.6 (−0.2)	34.3 (1.3)	39.0 (3.9)	56.1 (13.4)	58.3 (14.6)	52.3 (11.3)	43.0 (6.1)	35.8 (2.1)	33.1 (0.6)	40.1 (4.5)
Mean monthly sunshine hours	256.0	257.2	318.4	353.6	401.0	407.8	378.5	360.8	328.6	308.9	256.0	244.8	3,871.6
Percentage possible sunshine	81	84	86	90	93	95	86	87	89	88	82	79	87
Average ultraviolet index	3.1	4.4	6.6	8.5	9.7	10.9	11.0	10.1	8.3	5.6	3.7	2.7	7.0
Source 1: NOAA (dew points, relative humidity, and sun 1961–1990), Weather.com
Source 2: UV Index Today (1995 to 2022)

Climate data for Tucson, Arizona (Tucson Int'l), 1991–2020 normals, (Note: Mean monthly maxima and minima (i.e. the expected highest and lowest temperature readings at any point during the year or given month) calculated based on data at said location from 1991 to 2020.) extremes 1894−present (Note: Official records for Tucson kept September 1894 to January 1930 at the Weather Forecast Office, February 1930 to 14 October 1948 at the Weather bureau Office, and at Tucson Int'l since 15 October 1948. For more information, see ThreadEx)
Month	Jan	Feb	Mar	Apr	May	Jun	Jul	Aug	Sep	Oct	Nov	Dec	Year
Record high °F (°C)	88 (31)	92 (33)	102 (39)	104 (40)	111 (44)	117 (47)	114 (46)	112 (44)	111 (44)	106 (41)	94 (34)	85 (29)	117 (47)
Mean maximum °F (°C)	79.1 (26.2)	82.5 (28.1)	88.7 (31.5)	95.4 (35.2)	102.8 (39.3)	109.2 (42.9)	109.0 (42.8)	107.0 (41.7)	103.5 (39.7)	97.9 (36.6)	87.6 (30.9)	78.9 (26.1)	110.7 (43.7)
Mean daily maximum °F (°C)	66.5 (19.2)	69.2 (20.7)	75.8 (24.3)	82.9 (28.3)	91.8 (33.2)	101.2 (38.4)	100.2 (37.9)	98.6 (37.0)	95.1 (35.1)	86.3 (30.2)	75.1 (23.9)	65.5 (18.6)	84.0 (28.9)
Daily mean °F (°C)	53.6 (12.0)	56.2 (13.4)	61.9 (16.6)	68.1 (20.1)	76.8 (24.9)	86.1 (30.1)	88.2 (31.2)	86.9 (30.5)	82.8 (28.2)	72.6 (22.6)	61.5 (16.4)	53.0 (11.7)	70.6 (21.4)
Mean daily minimum °F (°C)	40.8 (4.9)	43.2 (6.2)	48.0 (8.9)	53.3 (11.8)	61.8 (16.6)	71.1 (21.7)	76.3 (24.6)	75.2 (24.0)	70.4 (21.3)	59.0 (15.0)	47.9 (8.8)	40.5 (4.7)	57.3 (14.1)
Mean minimum °F (°C)	28.5 (−1.9)	31.6 (−0.2)	35.6 (2.0)	41.1 (5.1)	50.3 (10.2)	60.3 (15.7)	67.8 (19.9)	68.3 (20.2)	60.8 (16.0)	44.9 (7.2)	32.9 (0.5)	27.8 (−2.3)	25.6 (−3.6)
Record low °F (°C)	6 (−14)	17 (−8)	20 (−7)	27 (−3)	32 (0)	43 (6)	49 (9)	55 (13)	43 (6)	26 (−3)	19 (−7)	10 (−12)	6 (−14)
Average precipitation inches (mm)	0.84 (21)	0.84 (21)	0.56 (14)	0.24 (6.1)	0.20 (5.1)	0.23 (5.8)	2.21 (56)	1.98 (50)	1.32 (34)	0.67 (17)	0.56 (14)	0.96 (24)	10.61 (269)
Average snowfall inches (cm)	0.0 (0.0)	0.1 (0.25)	0.0 (0.0)	0.0 (0.0)	0.0 (0.0)	0.0 (0.0)	0.0 (0.0)	0.0 (0.0)	0.0 (0.0)	0.0 (0.0)	0.0 (0.0)	0.0 (0.0)	0.1 (0.25)
Average precipitation days (≥ 0.01 in)	4.2	4.0	3.1	1.6	1.4	1.6	8.8	8.5	4.4	2.9	2.5	4.4	47.4
Average snowy days (≥ 0.1 in)	0.1	0.1	0.0	0.0	0.0	0.0	0.0	0.0	0.0	0.0	0.0	0.0	0.2
Average relative humidity (%)	48.4	42.7	37.0	27.0	22.0	21.1	41.6	46.6	41.7	38.4	42.7	50.0	38.3
Average dew point °F (°C)	28.2 (−2.1)	27.7 (−2.4)	27.7 (−2.4)	26.8 (−2.9)	29.1 (−1.6)	36.3 (2.4)	55.8 (13.2)	58.1 (14.5)	51.1 (10.6)	39.2 (4.0)	31.8 (−0.1)	29.5 (−1.4)	36.8 (2.7)
Mean monthly sunshine hours	259.9	258.2	320.7	357.2	400.8	396.9	342.7	335.6	316.4	307.4	264.4	245.8	3,806
Percentage possible sunshine	81	84	86	92	94	93	79	81	85	87	84	79	86
Source: NOAA (relative humidity, dew points and sun 1961–1990)

Climate data for Yuma, Arizona (1991–2020 normals, (Note: Mean monthly maxima and minima (i.e. the highest and lowest temperature readings during an entire month or year) calculated based on data at said location from 1991 to 2020.) sunshine 1981–2010, extremes 1878–present)
Month	Jan	Feb	Mar	Apr	May	Jun	Jul	Aug	Sep	Oct	Nov	Dec	Year
Record high °F (°C)	88 (31)	97 (36)	109 (43)	107 (42)	120 (49)	122 (50)	124 (51)	120 (49)	123 (51)	113 (45)	98 (37)	86 (30)	124 (51)
Mean maximum °F (°C)	79.5 (26.4)	84.1 (28.9)	92.8 (33.8)	100.3 (37.9)	106.2 (41.2)	112.9 (44.9)	115.0 (46.1)	114.4 (45.8)	110.6 (43.7)	102.2 (39.0)	89.5 (31.9)	78.0 (25.6)	116.6 (47.0)
Mean daily maximum °F (°C)	69.8 (21.0)	73.4 (23.0)	80.2 (26.8)	86.4 (30.2)	94.3 (34.6)	103.3 (39.6)	106.7 (41.5)	106.4 (41.3)	101.4 (38.6)	90.2 (32.3)	77.7 (25.4)	67.8 (19.9)	88.1 (31.2)
Daily mean °F (°C)	58.8 (14.9)	61.9 (16.6)	67.6 (19.8)	73.1 (22.8)	80.6 (27.0)	89.1 (31.7)	94.6 (34.8)	94.8 (34.9)	89.5 (31.9)	78.0 (25.6)	66.1 (18.9)	57.3 (14.1)	76.0 (24.4)
Mean daily minimum °F (°C)	47.9 (8.8)	50.4 (10.2)	55.0 (12.8)	60.8 (16.0)	66.9 (19.4)	75.0 (23.9)	82.6 (28.1)	83.2 (28.4)	77.6 (25.3)	65.7 (18.7)	54.4 (12.4)	46.8 (8.2)	63.8 (17.7)
Mean minimum °F (°C)	38.1 (3.4)	40.8 (4.9)	44.7 (7.1)	49.6 (9.8)	56.8 (13.8)	65.1 (18.4)	75.2 (24.0)	75.0 (23.9)	66.9 (19.4)	54.6 (12.6)	44.1 (6.7)	37.2 (2.9)	35.6 (2.0)
Record low °F (°C)	22 (−6)	25 (−4)	31 (−1)	38 (3)	39 (4)	50 (10)	61 (16)	58 (14)	50 (10)	35 (2)	29 (−2)	22 (−6)	22 (−6)
Average precipitation inches (mm)	0.39 (9.9)	0.38 (9.7)	0.39 (9.9)	0.14 (3.6)	0.06 (1.5)	0.01 (0.25)	0.24 (6.1)	0.20 (5.1)	0.68 (17)	0.13 (3.3)	0.23 (5.8)	0.43 (11)	3.28 (83)
Average precipitation days (≥ 0.01 in)	2.6	2.3	1.9	0.8	0.5	0.1	1.2	1.4	1.5	1.0	1.0	2.3	16.6
Mean monthly sunshine hours	268.4	270.8	335.5	365.5	407.4	415.4	392.6	375.6	341.7	319.6	270.1	252.7	4,015.3
Percentage possible sunshine	84	88	90	94	95	97	90	91	92	91	86	81	90
Average ultraviolet index	3	5	7	8	10	10	11	10	9	6	4	3	7
Source 1: NOAA
Source 2: Weather Atlas

== Physiographic regions ==
The physiographic regions of Arizona

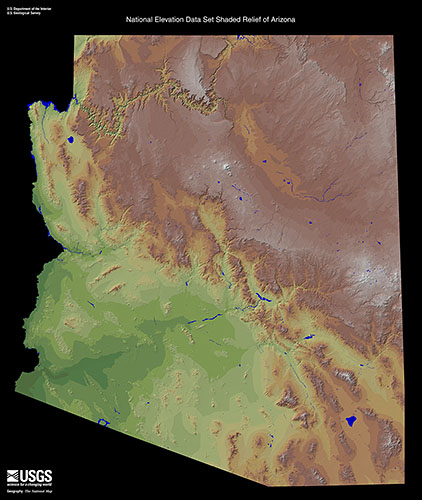
A shaded relief map of Arizona

Arizona can be divided into two major physiographic regions: the Colorado Plateau and the Basin and Range Province, and a transitioning zone between the two called the Transition Zone.

=== Colorado Plateau ===
The Colorado Plateau is a semi-arid, mostly flat-lying region ranging from 5,000 to 8,000 feet (1524 m to 2438 m) in elevation, centered on the Four Corners region. The Colorado Plateau encompasses an area of approximately 140,000 square miles (360,000 km^{2}). It consists of northern Arizona, except for a small portion of northwestern Arizona. The Plateau ends with the steep rock wall of the Mogollon Rim, which defines the southern edge of the plateau.

The Colorado Plateau has the nickname "Red Rock Country" because of its brightly colored sedimentary rock left visible by dryness and erosion, and protected from deformation. The geology of the Colorado Plateau is exhibited by the canyons of the Colorado River, and the Grand Canyon exposes one of the most unusual rock sequences in the world. The area hosts many distinctive natural features unique to Arizona, including the Grand Canyon, Antelope Canyon, Meteor Crater, Painted Desert, and the Petrified Forest.

=== Transition Zone ===
The Transition Zone is a northwest-trending escarpment of mountainous terrain in central Arizona shaped by the intersection of the higher-level Colorado Plateau with the lower-level Basin and Range Province. The area is termed the Transition Zone because it is transitional between the two regions, with characteristics from both. The area consists of a series of rugged mountain ranges and valleys. Many of the mountains of the Transition Zone are part of the Mogollon Rim, a cliff, or a dramatic escarpment in places, which extends 115 miles (190 km) from northern Yavapai County eastward to near the border with New Mexico.

The mountain ranges of the Transition Zone include the Mazatzal, Santa Maria, Sierra Ancha, and White mountain ranges. Because of the range of elevation within the Transition Zone, climatic conditions can vary widely over small areas. The Transition Zone tends to be one of the areas of Arizona to receive heavier rainfall due to its mountainous terrain, and experiences a variation in temperature by altitude.

Arizona level IV ecoregions.

=== Basin and Range Province ===
The Basin and Range Province is a region occupying the southern part of Arizona, along with a strip of land consisting of the western part of the state. It is also part of a much larger region encompassing southwestern New Mexico, western Utah, and virtually all of Nevada, and extending into northwestern Mexico. The Basin and Range is characterized by steep, linear mountain ranges alternating with lengthy deserts. The mountain ranges, which poke through the lengthy desert plains surrounding them, can rise above 9,000 feet (2,700 m), and create biological islands inhabited by cool-climate plants and animals. The geology of the Basin and Range is the result of crustal extension of the North American plate. Due to the crustal extension, the area of the crust underneath the region is some of the thinnest in the world. The Basin and Range supplies nearly all of the copper mined in Arizona, and contains other minerals such as gold, silver, and barite.

== Rivers ==
The major rivers of Arizona are the Colorado River, and one of its main tributaries, the Gila River. Nearly all of Arizona is drained by either the Colorado River or one of its tributaries.

=== Colorado River ===
The Colorado River is vital to Arizona because of the perennial dryness of the region. The river is famous because of its role in the creation of the Grand Canyon, which was created over a period of six million years. Several irrigation systems divert water from the Colorado River, of which the one most vital to Arizona is the Central Arizona Project. The Central Arizona Project, which is 336 miles (541 km) long, diverts 1,500,000 acre-feet (1.9 km^{3}) of water from Lake Havasu City into central and southern Arizona. The river is also utilized for hydroelectric power through various dams along the river. The dams on the Colorado River, going downstream, are the Glen Canyon Dam, Hoover Dam, Davis Dam, Parker Dam, Imperial Dam, Laguna Dam, and the Morelos Dam.

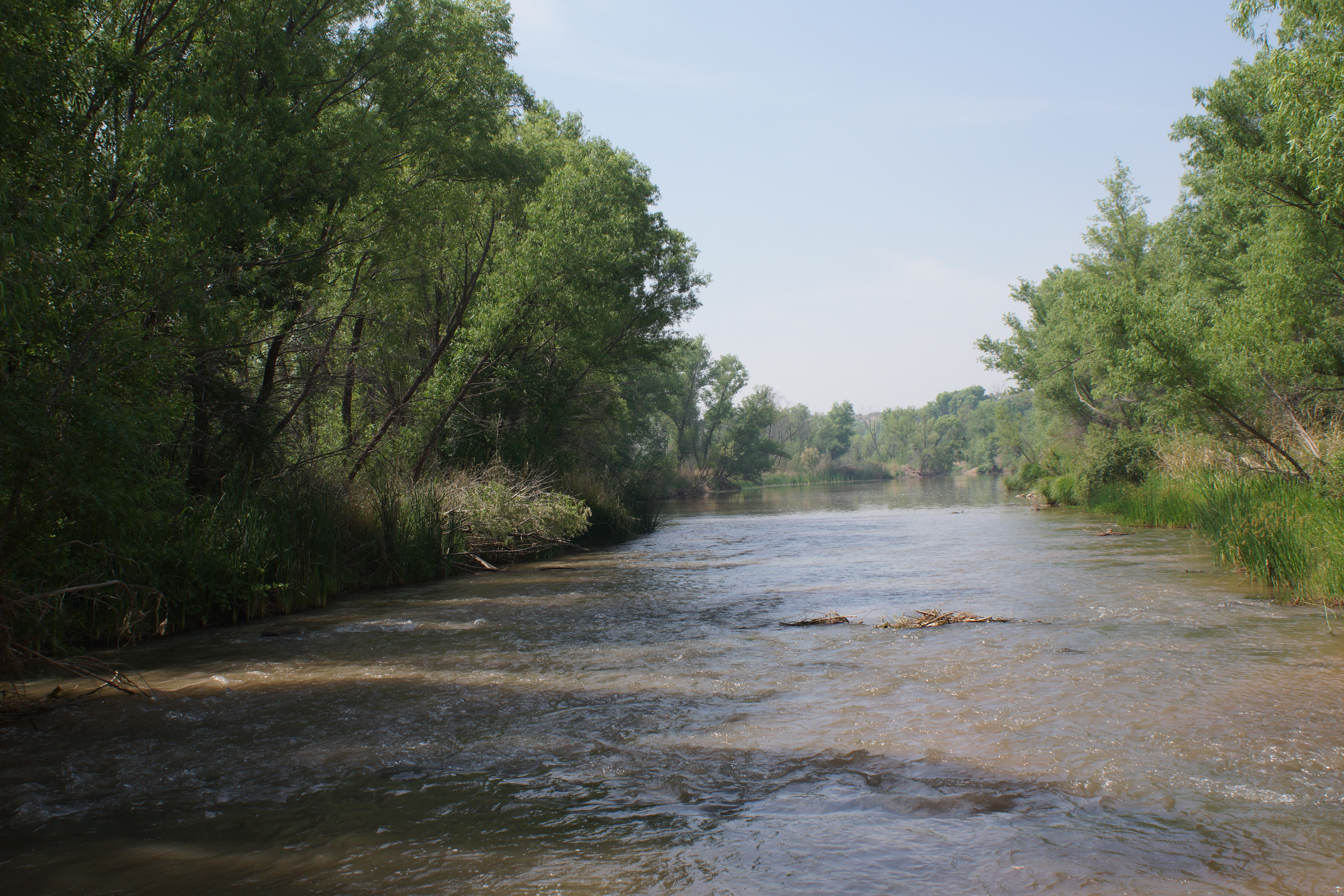
Verde River

=== Gila River ===
The Gila River is 650 miles (1,050 km) long, and extends from southwestern New Mexico to its confluence with the Colorado River near Yuma. While the upper Gila River is free-flowing, the portion of the river below the Phoenix area is usually either a trickle or completely dry because of the diversion of water for irrigation. The only major dam on the Gila River is Coolidge Dam, located 31 miles (50 km) southeast of Globe, Arizona.

== Deserts ==
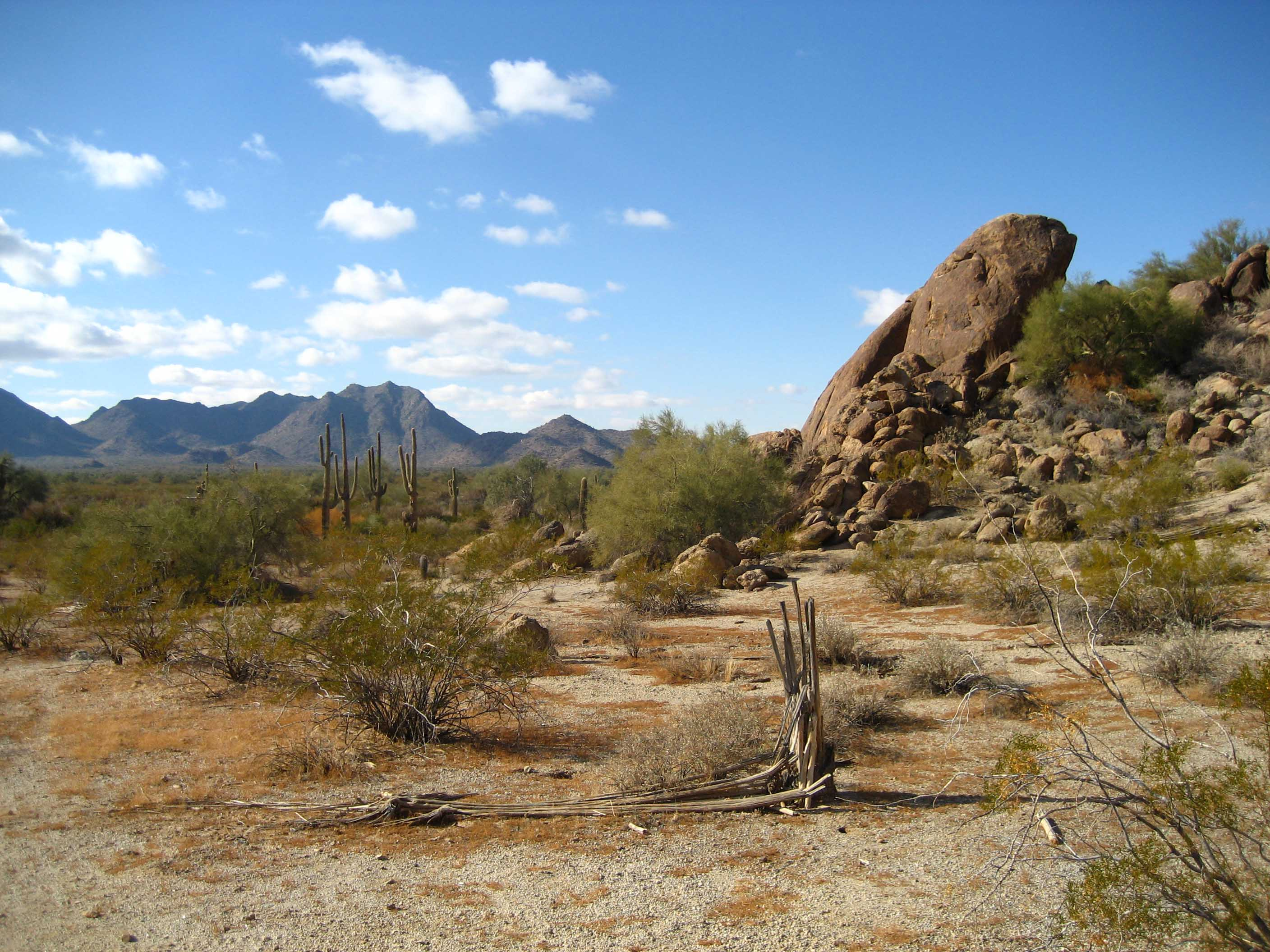
The Sonoran Desert 35 miles (56 km) west of Maricopa, Arizona

=== Sonoran Desert ===
The Sonoran Desert covers the southwestern area of Arizona, including the cities of Phoenix, Tucson, and Yuma. The Sonoran Desert is one of the hottest deserts of the United States, and maintains warm temperatures year round. Despite the sparse amounts of precipitation during the year, the desert is home to a diverse population of flora and fauna because it has two rainy seasons a year. Several plant populations thrive because of their specialized adaptions to the climate, and various species of cactus can be found in the wild. The Sonoran Desert is the only place in the world where the saguaro cactus grows in the wild, and the fishhook, prickly pear, and organ pipe are among other types of cactus found in the Sonoran Desert.

=== Mojave Desert ===
Northwestern Arizona contains part of the Mojave Desert, which is at a higher altitude than the Sonoran Desert. The boundaries of the Mojave Desert can be determined by the presence of Yucca brevifolia (Yucca palm), which is endemic to the desert. Unlike the Sonoran Desert, the Mojave Desert has few trees, both in number and diversity.

=== Painted Desert ===
The Painted Desert is a broad area of badlands located on the Colorado Plateau in Northern Arizona. It covers at least 146 square miles (380 km^{2}), and stretches from 30 miles (48 km) north of Cameron, near the Grand Canyon, ending just beyond the Petrified Forest. The Painted Desert derives its name from the multitude of colored sediments and bentonite clay seen from its Chinle rock formation, left exposed by erosion. In the southern portion of the desert, the remains of a Triassic period coniferous forest have fossilized over millions of years. Most of the Painted Desert is located within the Navajo Nation, and is only accessible by foot.

=== Chihuahuan Desert ===
A small portion of southeastern Arizona is part of the Chihuahuan Desert. Because of its higher elevation in comparison to the Sonoran Desert, it tends to have milder temperatures during the summer.

== Islands ==
Arizona is the third largest state to not have an ocean coastline—after Montana and New Mexico. Despite being landlocked, Arizona does contain islands, even though the state has the third lowest amount of water at only 363.73 mi² (942 km²) after West Virginia and New Mexico. Arizona's 0.3% of water is the second lowest percentage after New Mexico's 0.2% of water. The majority of Arizona's islands are in the Colorado River (mainly Lake Mead). Lake Roosevelt also contains a number of islands.

== Mountains ==
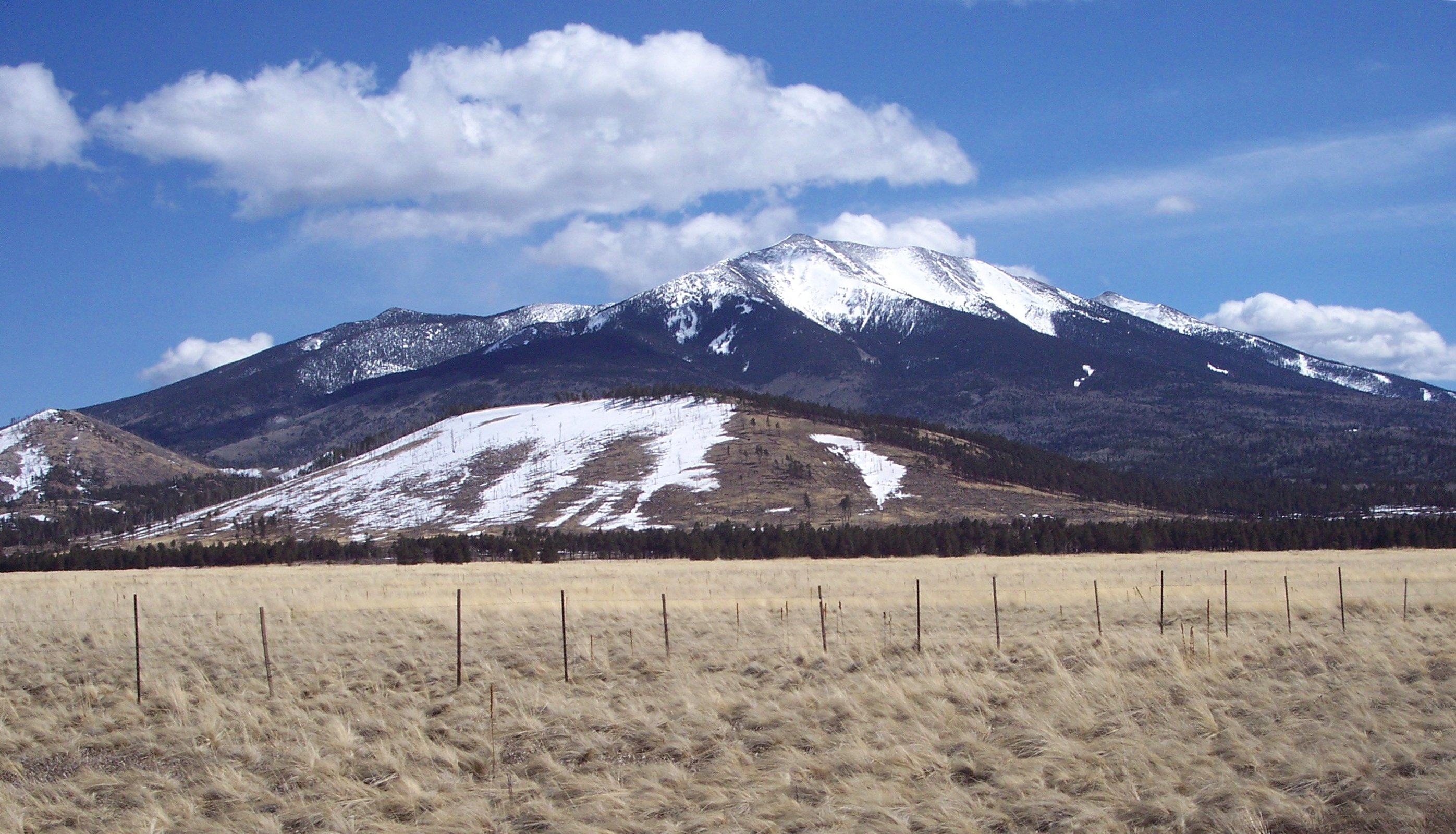
Humphreys Peak seen on its western side from U.S. Route 180, with Agassiz Peak in the background

Arizona is a fairly mountainous and rugged state, and is home to the world's largest contiguous ponderosa pine forest. Many mountain ranges exceed 9,000 feet (2,700 m) in elevation, and some can hold snow all summer.

Arizona has 194 named mountain ranges. The highest are along the southwest margin of the Colorado Plateau, including the volcanic San Francisco Peaks just north of Flagstaff and the White Mountains of the Mogollon Rim. The Basin and Range region of southern and western Arizona has many rugged ranges existing as sky islands in the Sonoran and Chihuahuan deserts.

=== Ten highest mountain peaks ===
==== Humphreys Peak ====
Humphreys Peak in the Coconino National Forest is the highest summit in Arizona. It is part of the San Francisco Peaks, a volcanic mountain range 9 miles (14 km) north of Flagstaff. It tops out at 12,633 feet (3,851 m) above sea level, and is one of the most prominent summits in the United States outside of the Rocky Mountains. The mountain is high enough to maintain snow cover in summer, when temperatures may not exceed 40 °F. The only maintained trail to the summit is the Humphreys Trail, a strenuous hike that starts at Arizona Snowbowl. Towards the top of the trail Humphreys Peak contains the only area of subarctic tundra south of the Rocky Mountains.

==== Agassiz Peak ====
Simply referred to as "Agassiz", Agassiz Peak is Mount Humphreys' sister peak and one of the San Francisco Mountains' "Big 4", or the top five highest peaks in Arizona. Its summit is 12,356 feet (3,766 m) above sea level. The mountain is closed to climbers in the summer to protect its fragile tundra environment. This peak loses its snow usually in late May but has been known to keep snow until June.

==== Fremont Peak ====
At 11,946 feet (3,641 m) above sea level, Fremont Peak is also located in the San Francisco Mountains. This summit is relatively unknown to visitors and locals, and it is located along the Doyle Saddle, where it is not very prominent. It really isn't a summit, just a high point on the Doyle Saddle. The Humphreys Trail runs on this ridge and atop Fremont Peak.

==== Aubineau Peak ====
Aubineau Peak, the fourth highest summit in Arizona, tops out at 11,818 feet (3,602 m) above sea level. This is a fairly steep peak, and the home of the 2005 avalanche. This mountain is on the north side of the San Francisco Mountains and is adjacent to Abineau Canyon.

==== Ree's Peak ====
Ree's Peak is a much smaller peak than most of the summits in the San Francisco mountains, and at 11,444 feet (3,488 m), it makes the northeastern tip of the range. This peak lacks alpine tundra but is home to the famed bristlecone pine. The peak is distinguishable only by looking directly at it, otherwise the other summits completely flush it out.

==== Doyle Peak ====
Doyle Peak is listed at 11,440 feet (3,487 m), and can be seen as the summit most on the right, if you are looking at the San Francisco Mountains from the Flagstaff area. The peak can be best viewed from Shultz Pass road, and is known for its continuous aspen belt. This peak is the starting point of the Doyle Saddle, connecting Doyle Peak with Agassiz Peak.

==== Mount Baldy ====
Mount Baldy, located in Arizona's White Mountains on the Fort Apache Indian Reservation, is an eroded mountain peak whose summit is 11,391 feet (3,472 m) above sea level. Its name was given to it by locals because it lacks trees on the upper ridge, giving it a baldlike appearance. Mount Baldy is home to the Sunrise Ski Area. The mountain is not part of a range, just a single prominent peak whose flanks are gentle and peak is rounded, not rugged. This is the same for most of the White Mountains, a geologically old range once as high as the Alaska Range, but that has been eroded away over the eons. Mount Baldy is home to a bristlecone pine forest, and some consider the White Mountains as a Rocky Mountains extension due to similar averages in elevation, tree species, animals, and weather.

==== Mount Ord ====
At 11,348 feet (3,459 m), Mount Ord is part of the White Mountains, and is located in Apache County on the Fort Apache Indian Reservation. Snow often stays on this mountain the longest during summer due to its high elevation and gentle north slope, snow can stick at 3 to 6 inches (76 to 152 mm), sometimes more, until June, only then melting into patches.

==== Paradise Butte ====
At 11,148 feet (3,398 m), Paradise Butte is found in the White Mountains near Mount Baldy and Mount Ord, near Sunrise Ski Park.

==== Mount Thomas ====
In Apache County, Mount Thomas tops out at 11,121 feet (3,390 m).

== Gallery ==
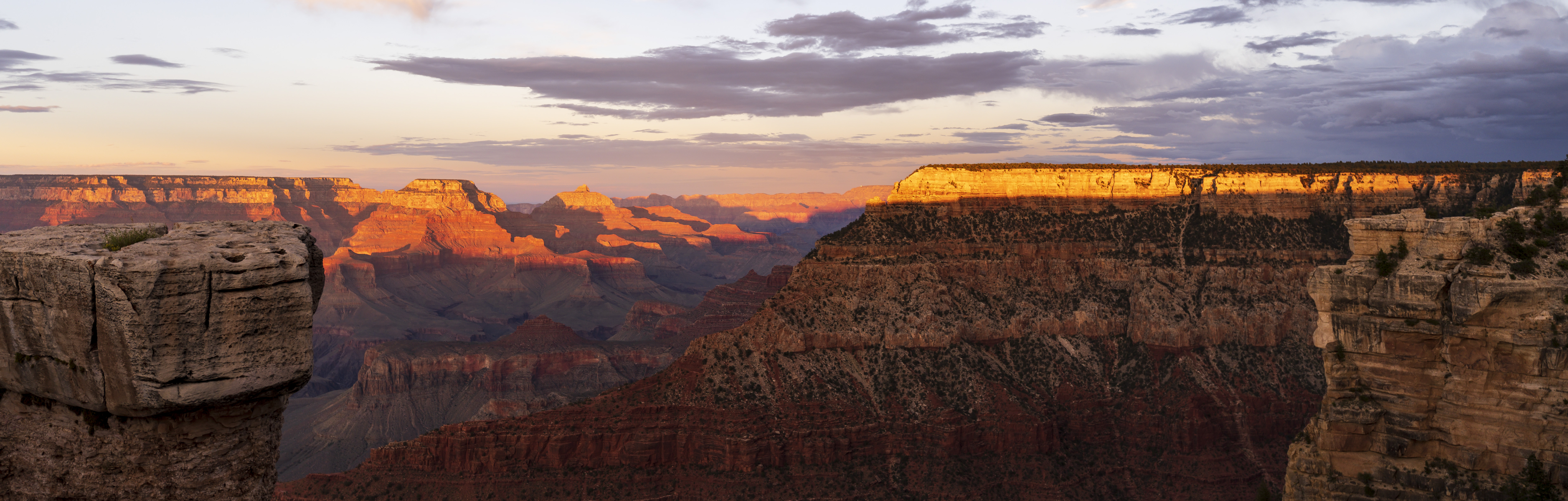
Grand Canyon South Rim at Sunset.

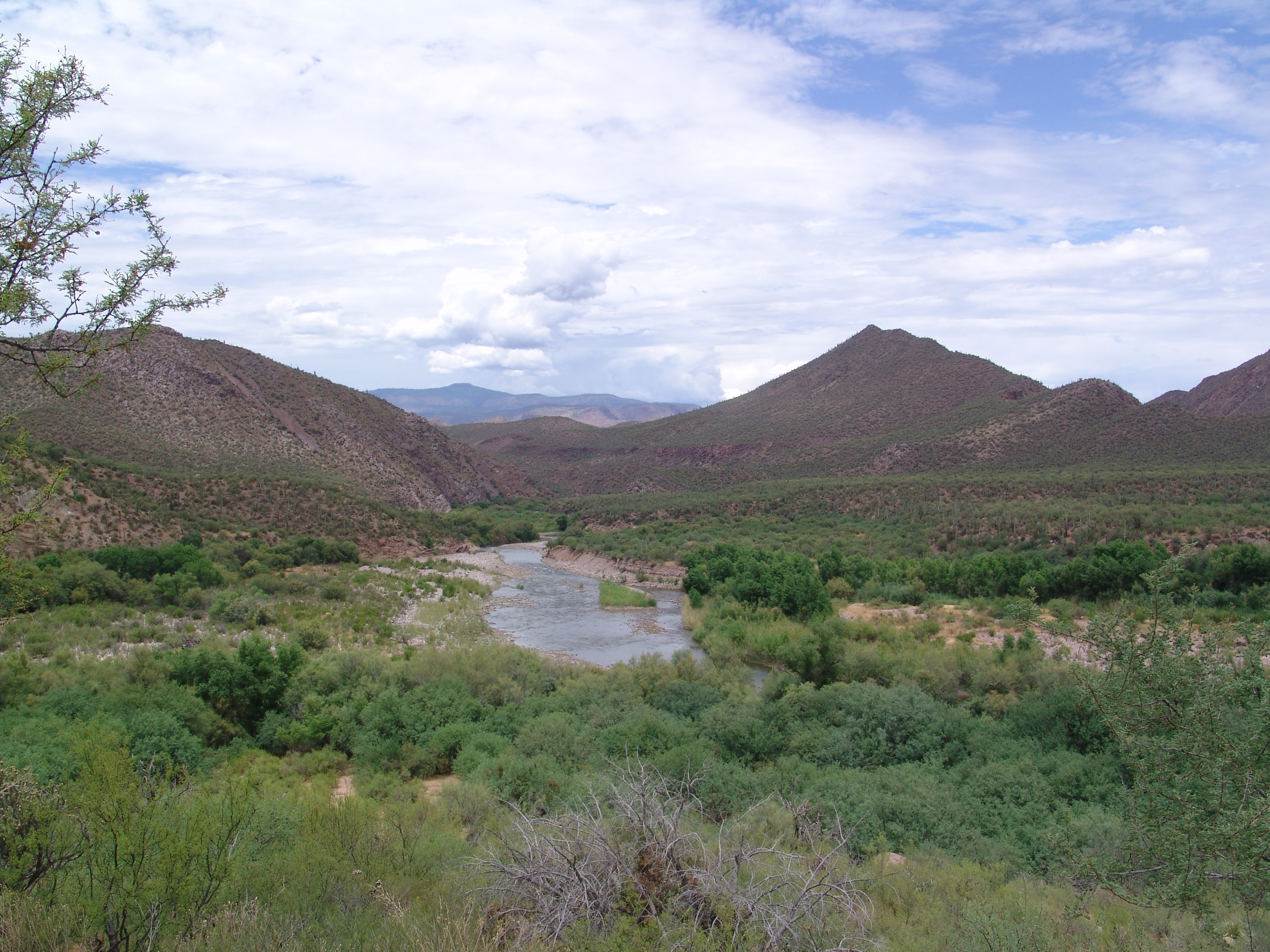
Upper Salt River (Arizona) with the Sierra Ancha in the background.

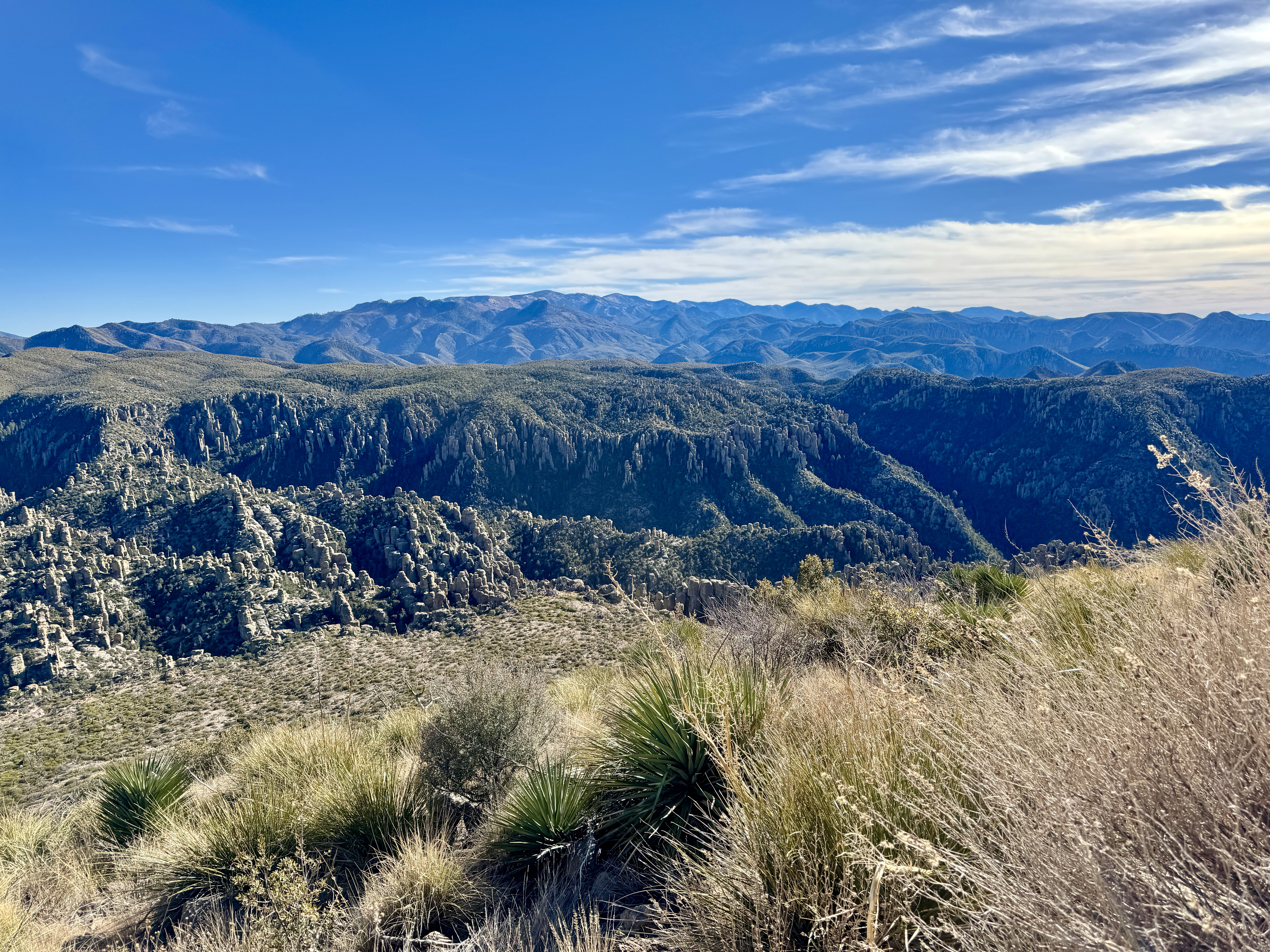
Chiricahua National Monument

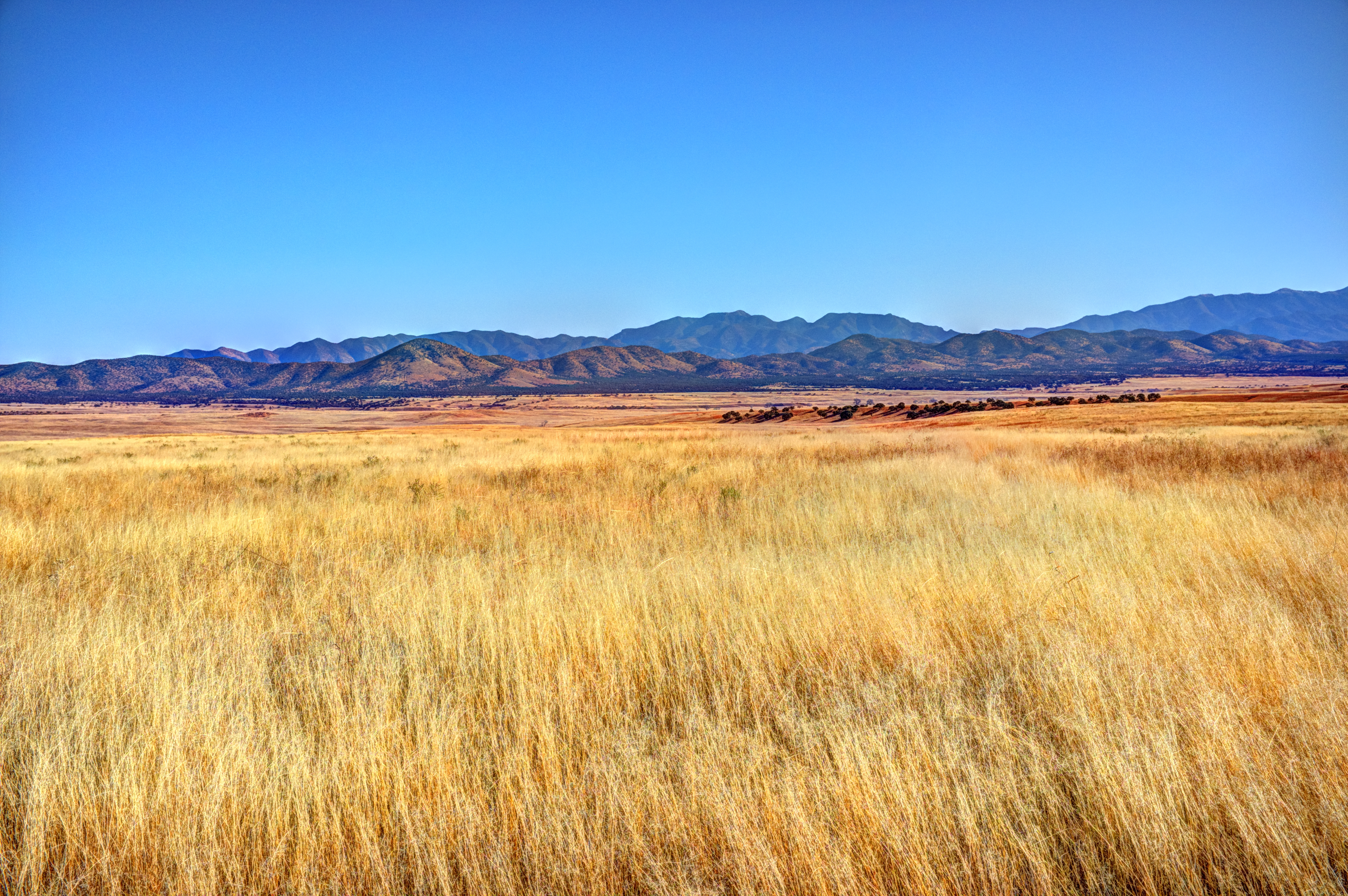
San Rafael Valley

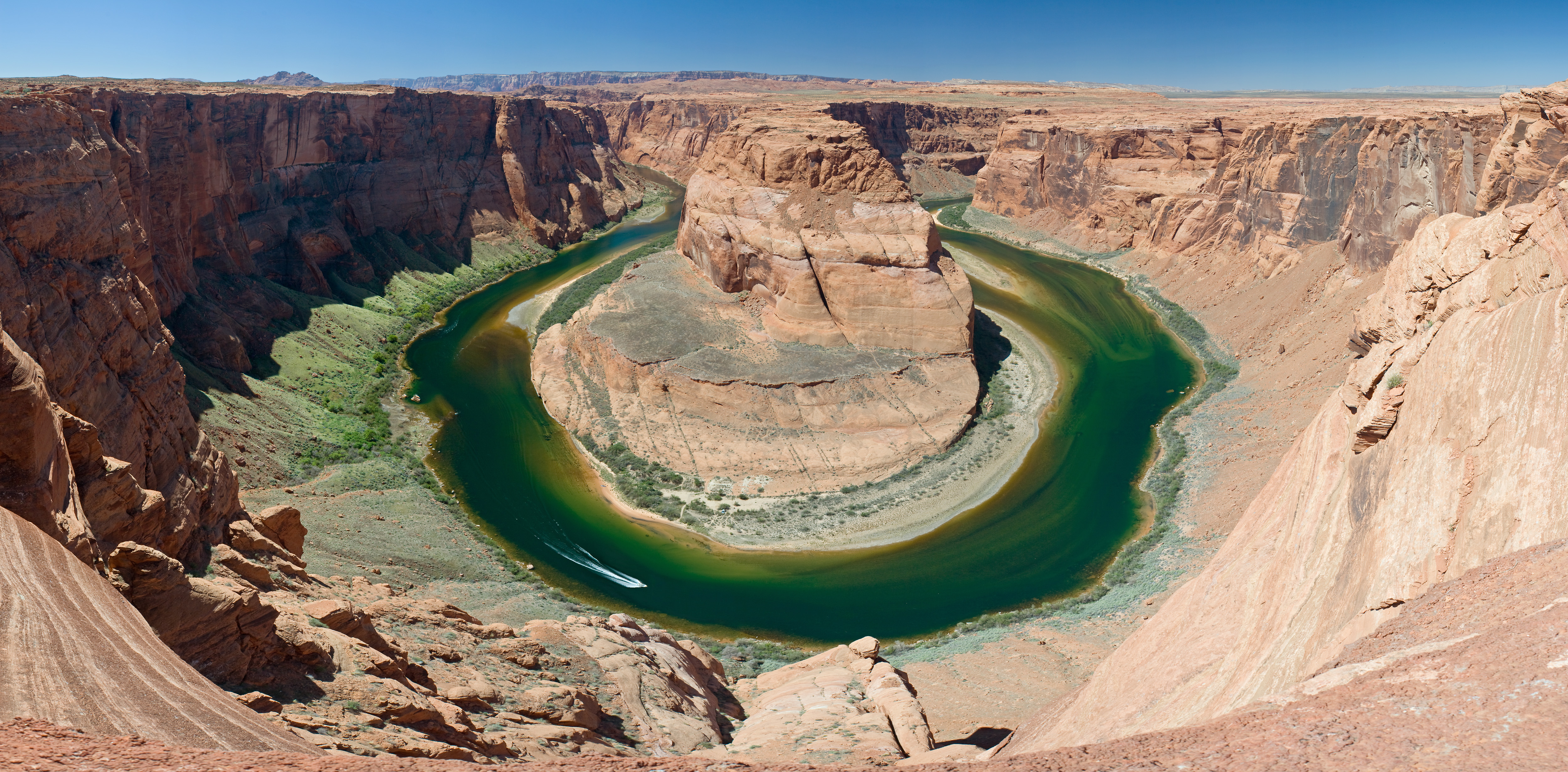
Horseshoe Bend (Arizona)

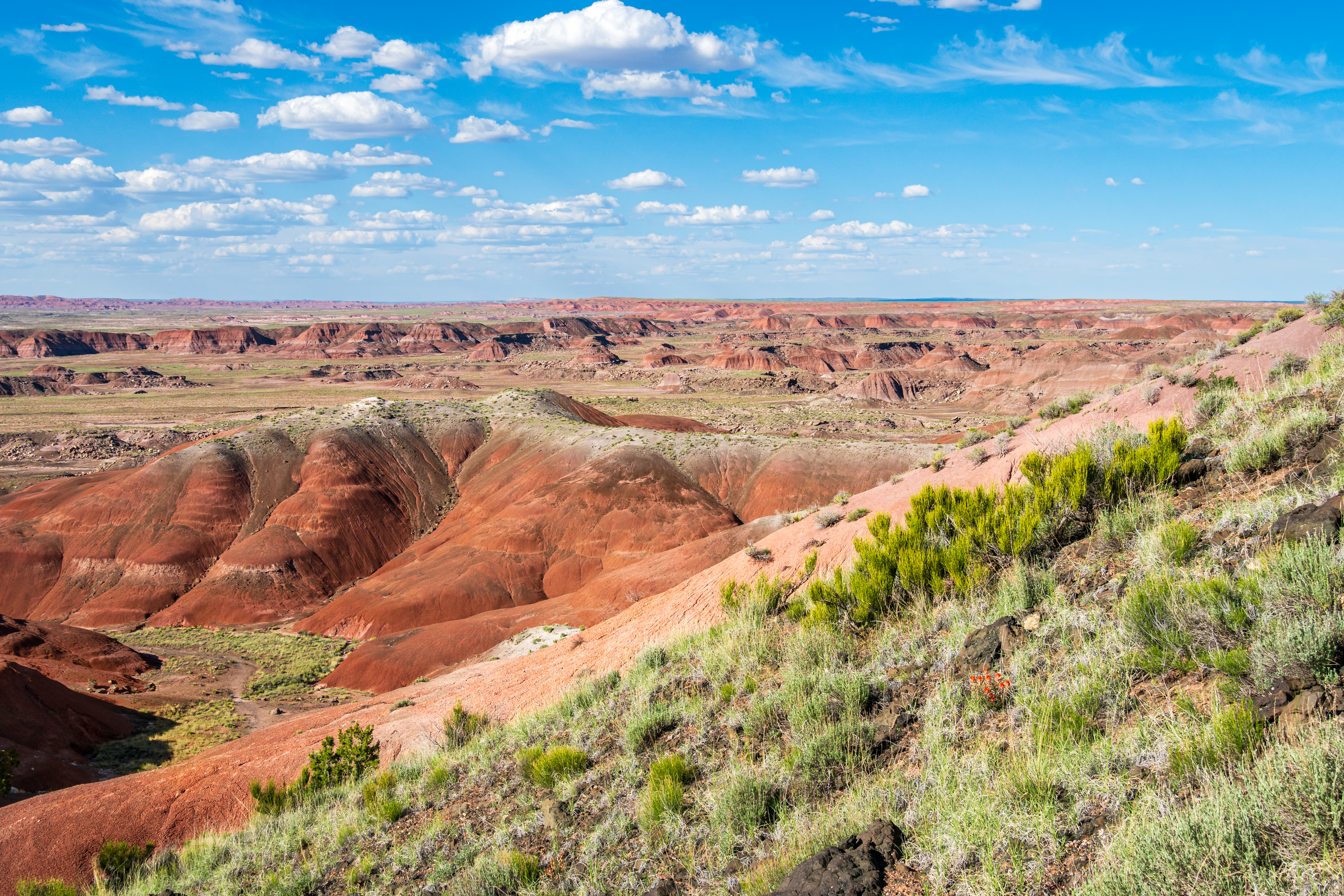
Petrified Forest National Park

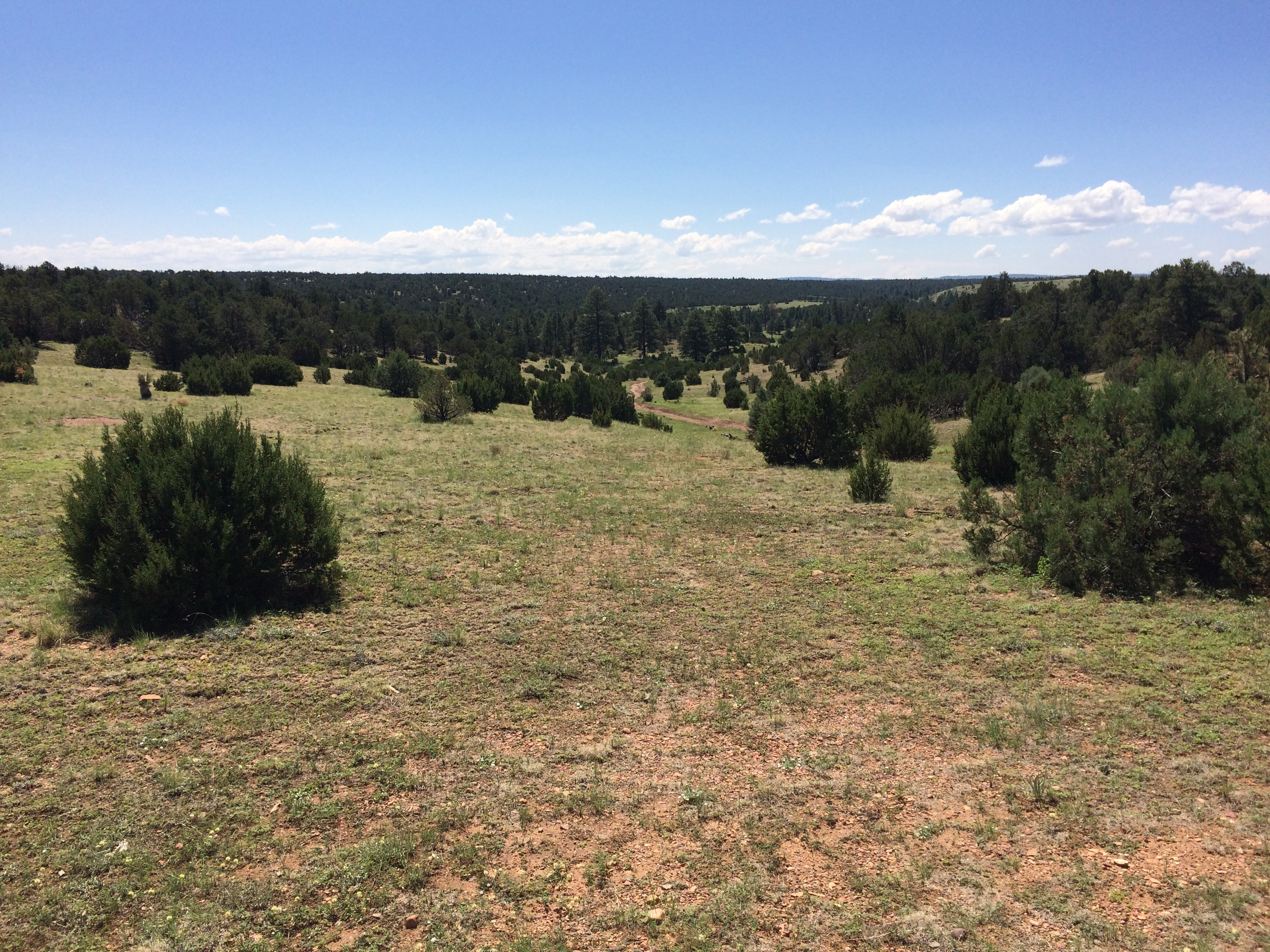
Pinyon-juniper woodland near Heber-Overgaard, Arizona.

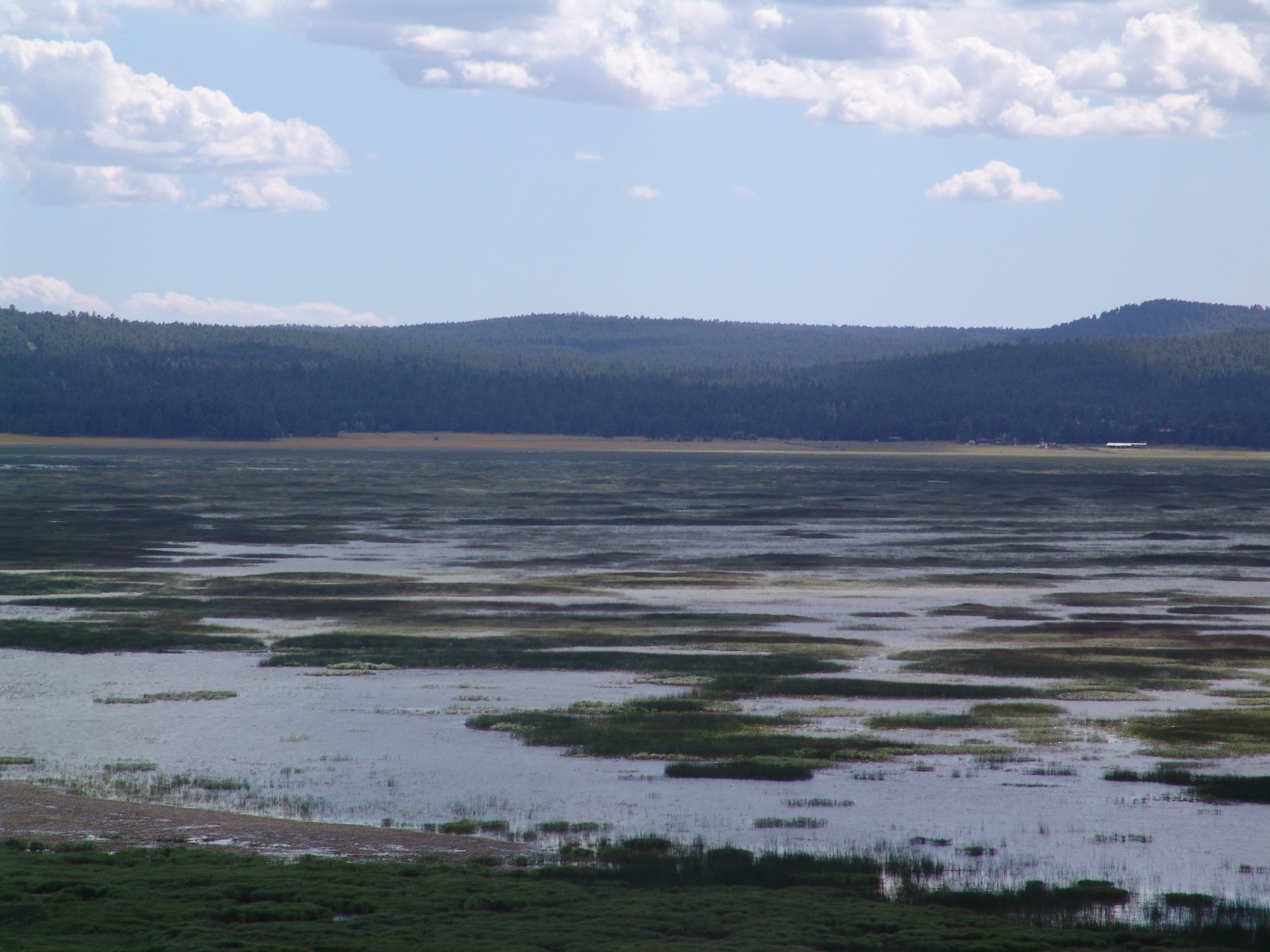
Mormon Lake

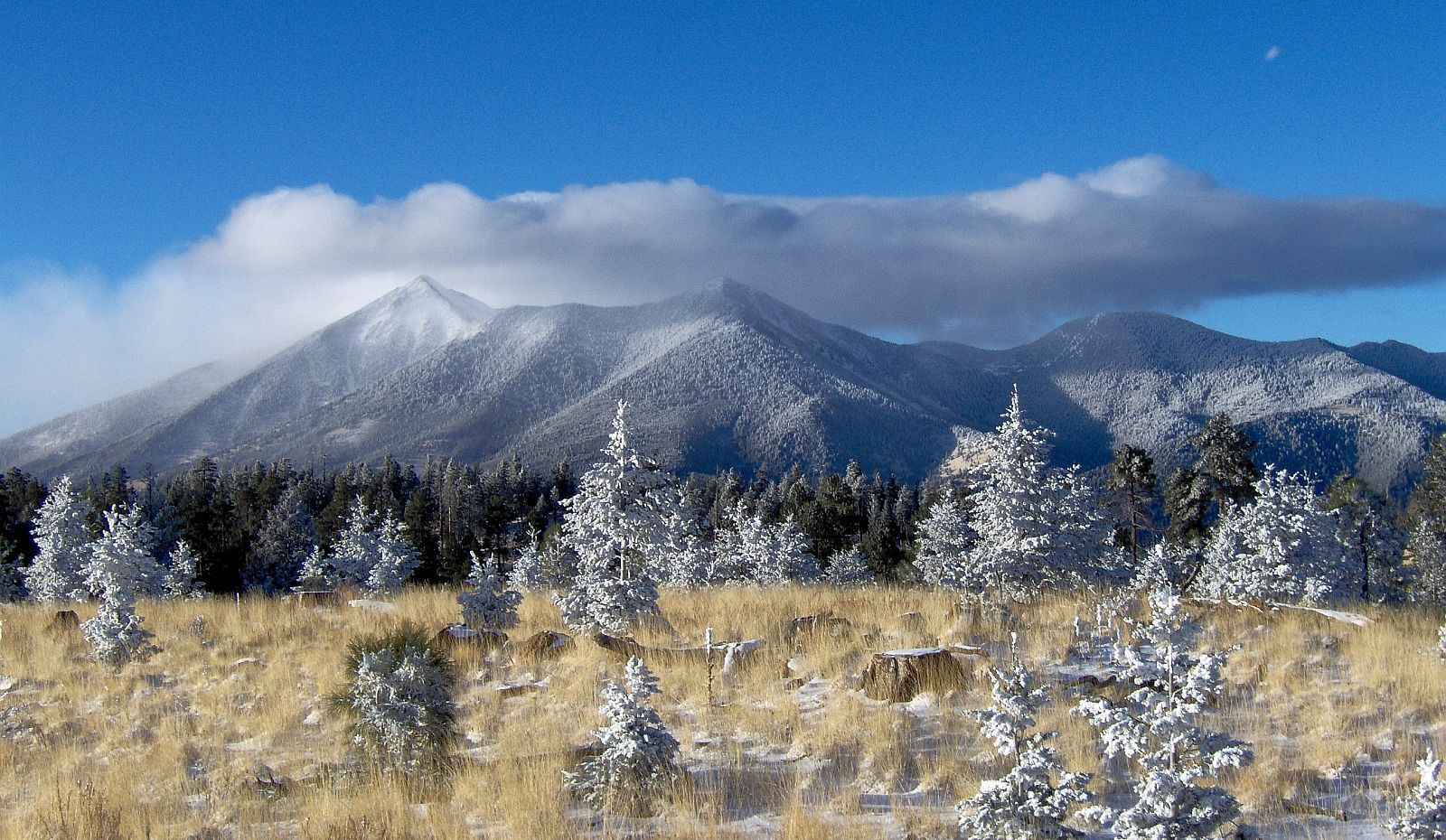
San Francisco Peaks

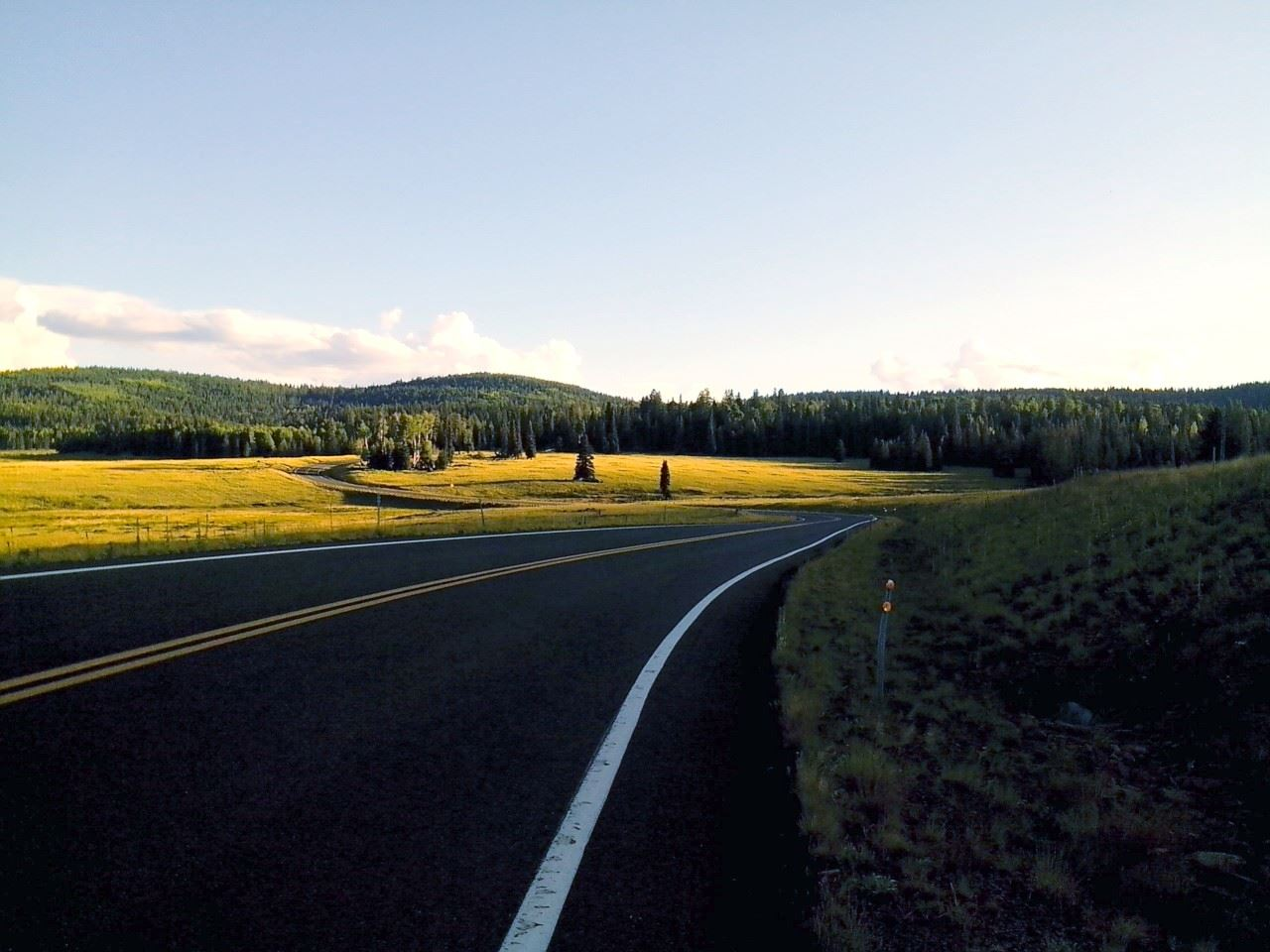
White Mountains (Arizona)

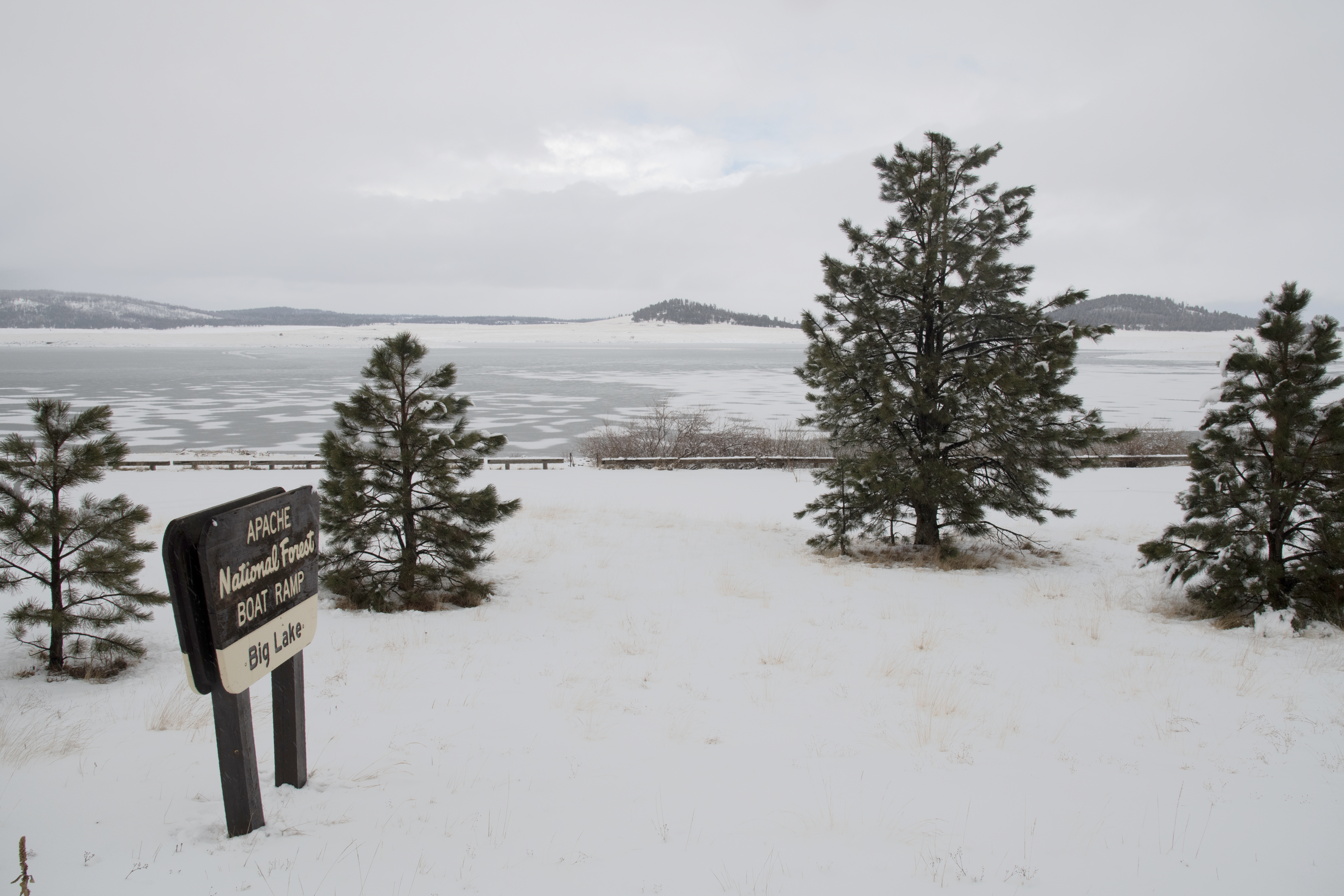
Big Lake (Arizona)

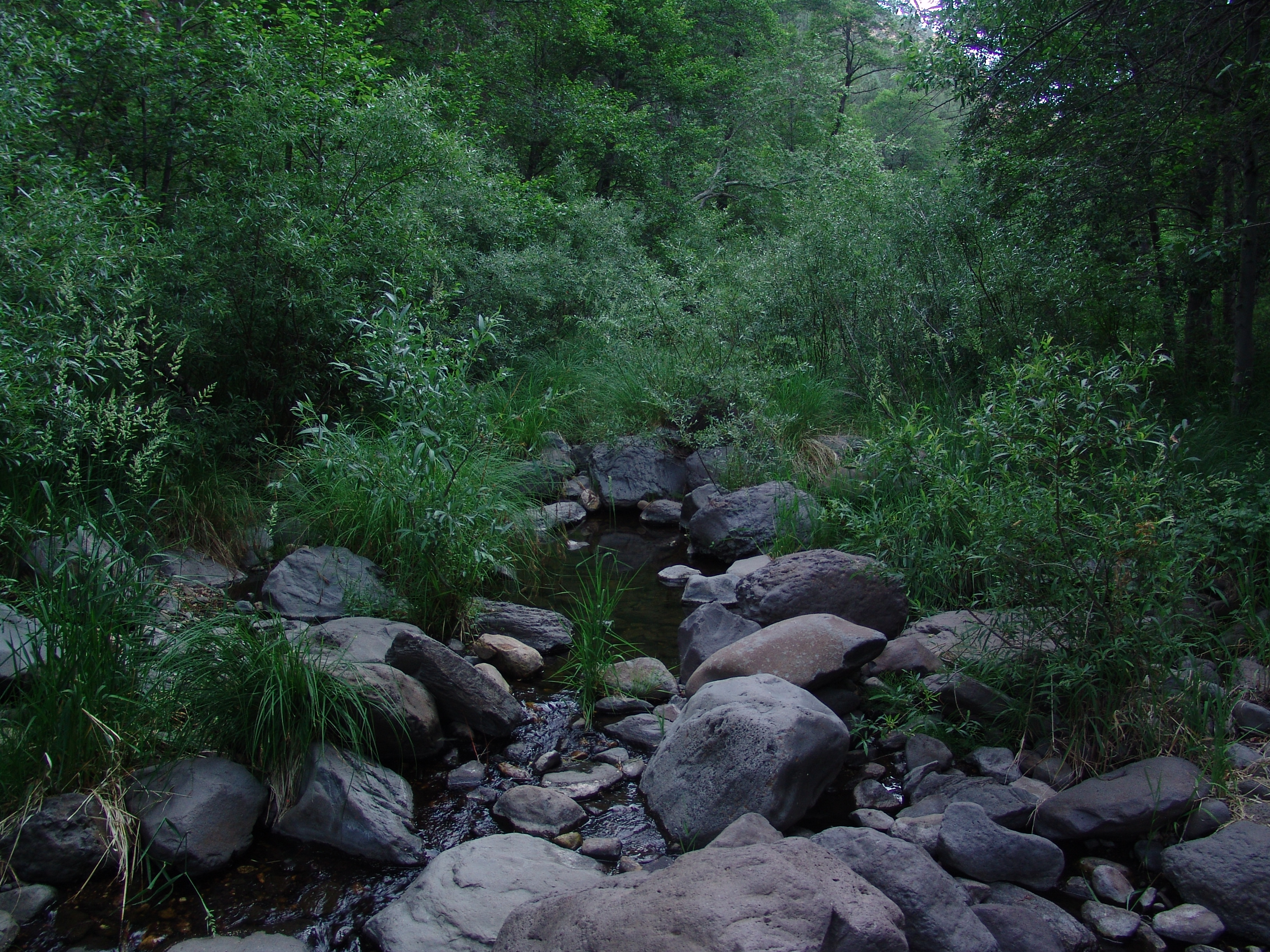
Riparian forest along upper Oak Creek Canyon

== See also ==
- List of regions of Arizona
- List of volcanic craters in Arizona
