= Kachina Peaks Wilderness =

Wilderness area in Arizona, US

- IUCN category Ib (wilderness area)
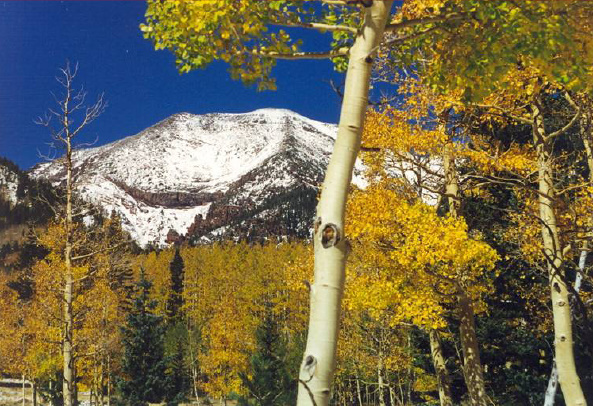
- Humphreys Peak from the Inner Basin Trail
- Interactive map of Kachina Peaks Wilderness
- Location: Coconino County, Arizona, US
- Nearest city: Flagstaff, AZ
- Coordinates: 35°20′22″N 111°39′45″W
- Area: 18,616 acres (75 km^{2})
- Established: 1984
- Governing body: U.S. Forest Service

Kachina Peaks Wilderness is a 18,616-acre (75 km^{2}) wilderness area about 6 miles (10 km) north of Flagstaff within the Coconino National Forest in the U.S. state of Arizona.

The wilderness encompasses most of the upper reaches of the San Francisco Peaks including Humphreys Peak, Arizona's highest point at 12,643 feet (3,854 m). The area is named for the Hopi spirit beings, or Kachinas, some of whom according to Hopi mythology live here from July to December. In mid-summer kachinas can bring clouds and rain from the top of the peaks to the Hopi mesas during the seasonal monsoons. These peaks are sacred to tribes including the Havasupai, Hopi, Navajo, and Zuni. Several religious shrines have been identified in the wilderness, some of which are still in use.

== Geology ==
Kachina Peaks Wilderness is part of a large composite volcano that last erupted roughly two million years ago. Some of the area's trails lead to the top of the Kachina Peaks: Humphreys Peak, Doyle Peak (11,460 ft), Fremont Peak (11,969 ft), and Agassiz Peak (12,365 ft). These mountains form the rim of the volcano's inner basin, a huge caldera which was formed during its last eruption.

Kachina Peaks Wilderness features Arizona's best examples of Ice Age glaciation, found in lateral and medial moraines and abandoned stream beds.

== Climate ==
Snowslide Canyon is a SNOTEL weather station in the Kachina Peaks Wilderness, located within the inner basin of the San Francisco Peaks. Snowslide Canyon has a dry-summer subalpine climate (Köppen Dsc), bordering on a dry-summer humid continental climate (Köppen Dsb).

Climate data for Snowslide Canyon, Arizona, 2002–2020 normals, 1997-2020 extremes: 9730ft (2966m)
Month	Jan	Feb	Mar	Apr	May	Jun	Jul	Aug	Sep	Oct	Nov	Dec	Year
Record high °F (°C)	53 (12)	57 (14)	66 (19)	70 (21)	78 (26)	80 (27)	84 (29)	79 (26)	77 (25)	70 (21)	61 (16)	53 (12)	84 (29)
Mean maximum °F (°C)	48.6 (9.2)	51.0 (10.6)	58.0 (14.4)	61.6 (16.4)	68.5 (20.3)	76.2 (24.6)	77.0 (25.0)	73.1 (22.8)	69.6 (20.9)	63.2 (17.3)	55.8 (13.2)	48.8 (9.3)	77.9 (25.5)
Mean daily maximum °F (°C)	36.2 (2.3)	38.3 (3.5)	45.0 (7.2)	49.4 (9.7)	56.2 (13.4)	67.4 (19.7)	69.1 (20.6)	66.2 (19.0)	60.9 (16.1)	52.2 (11.2)	42.8 (6.0)	35.6 (2.0)	51.6 (10.9)
Daily mean °F (°C)	26.2 (−3.2)	27.5 (−2.5)	33.1 (0.6)	38.1 (3.4)	44.6 (7.0)	55.3 (12.9)	58.4 (14.7)	56.0 (13.3)	50.3 (10.2)	41.8 (5.4)	33.4 (0.8)	26.2 (−3.2)	40.9 (5.0)
Mean daily minimum °F (°C)	16.2 (−8.8)	16.8 (−8.4)	21.2 (−6.0)	26.8 (−2.9)	33.0 (0.6)	43.1 (6.2)	47.8 (8.8)	45.7 (7.6)	39.7 (4.3)	31.4 (−0.3)	24.0 (−4.4)	16.9 (−8.4)	30.2 (−1.0)
Mean minimum °F (°C)	−2.3 (−19.1)	−2.0 (−18.9)	3.9 (−15.6)	12.6 (−10.8)	21.2 (−6.0)	30.7 (−0.7)	40.9 (4.9)	38.7 (3.7)	28.9 (−1.7)	17.8 (−7.9)	7.6 (−13.6)	−2.9 (−19.4)	−7.8 (−22.1)
Record low °F (°C)	−15 (−26)	−15 (−26)	−8 (−22)	−1 (−18)	11 (−12)	14 (−10)	29 (−2)	28 (−2)	18 (−8)	5 (−15)	−7 (−22)	−14 (−26)	−15 (−26)
Average precipitation inches (mm)	4.13 (105)	4.38 (111)	3.74 (95)	2.46 (62)	1.30 (33)	0.59 (15)	3.74 (95)	4.38 (111)	2.77 (70)	2.53 (64)	3.12 (79)	3.86 (98)	37 (938)
Average extreme snow depth inches (cm)	48.3 (123)	60.2 (153)	63.1 (160)	43.9 (112)	15.6 (40)	0.4 (1.0)	0.6 (1.5)	0.2 (0.51)	0.6 (1.5)	3.5 (8.9)	15.6 (40)	32.1 (82)	64.6 (164)
Source: XMACIS2

== Vegetation ==
The only Arctic-Alpine vegetation in Arizona is found in a fragile 2-square-mile (5.2 km^{2}) zone on the peaks of Kachina Peaks Wilderness. This is the only place where the threatened San Francisco Peaks groundsel (Packera franciscana) is found.

== Recreation ==
Common recreational activities in Kachina Peaks Wilderness include hiking, backpacking, cross-country skiing, snowboarding, snowshoeing, and hunting.

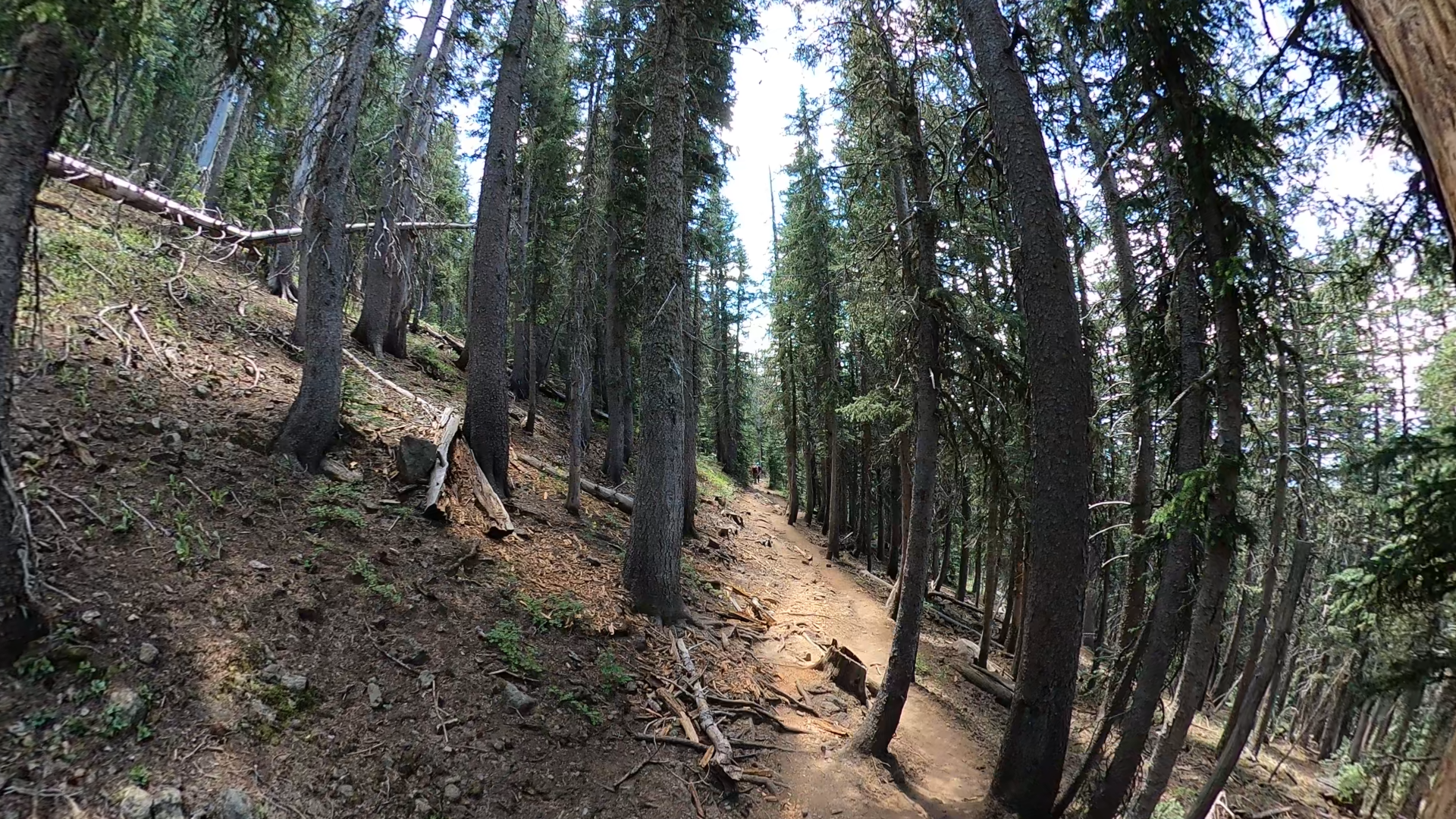
Forest path, Kachina Peaks wilderness

== See also ==
- List of Arizona Wilderness Areas
- List of U.S. Wilderness Areas
- Wilderness Act
