= Judge Doyle =

Judge Doyle may refer to:

- Adrian Leo Doyle (born 1936), judge of the Appeal Tribunal of the Hobart Archdiocese
- David Doyle (judge) (fl. 1970s–2020s), judge of the Grand Court of the Cayman Islands
- James Edward Doyle (1915–1987), judge of the United States District Court for the Western District of Wisconsin
- Joseph T. Doyle (1931–2012), judge of the Commonwealth Court of Pennsylvania
- Neil Young (judge), judge of the Federal Court of Australia
- Robert B. Doyle (fl. 1970s–2020s), judge of the Family Division of the Manitoba Court of King's Bench
- Sara L. Doyle (born 1968), judge of the Georgia Court of Appeals
- Thomas H. Doyle (1863–1949), judge of the Oklahoma Court of Criminal Appeals
- William Edward Doyle (1911–1986), judge of the United States Court of Appeals for the Tenth Circuit

== See also ==
- Justice Doyle (disambiguation)
