= Fremont Peak (Arizona) =

Summit in Coconino County, Arizona, US

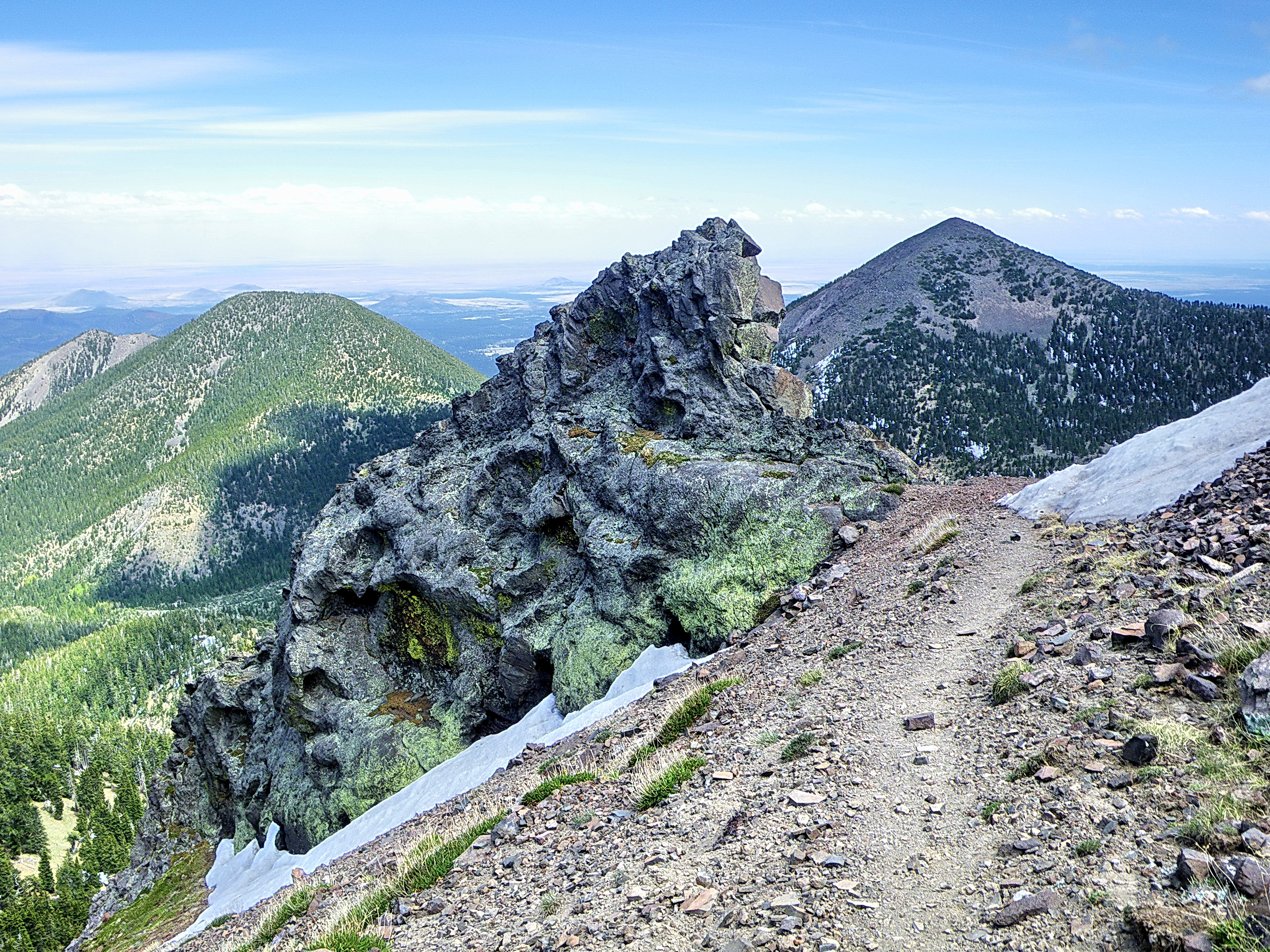
- Doyle Peak and Fremont Peak (right) from the eastern side of Agassiz Peak

Highest point
- Elevation: 11,973 ft (3,649 m) NAVD 88
- Prominence: 615 ft (187 m)
- Parent peak: Agassiz Peak
- Coordinates: 35°19′23″N 111°39′40″W

Geography
- Location within Arizona
- Location: Coconino County, Arizona, U.S.
- Parent range: San Francisco Peaks
- Topo map: USGS Humphreys Peak

Geology
- Volcanic field: San Francisco volcanic field

Climbing
- Easiest route: From Doyle Saddle

Fremont Peak is a peak in the San Francisco Peaks, a mountain range that takes up a part of the Coconino National Forest in northern Arizona. It is the third highest point in the state of Arizona, and named in honor John C. Frémont (1813–1890), an explorer and civil war general, who served as the governor of Arizona Territory from 1878 to 1882. The peak is in the Kachina Peaks Wilderness on the Coconino National Forest.

Fremont offers year-round views of the south. It can be seen from Flagstaff, Arizona as the pointy peak on the right.

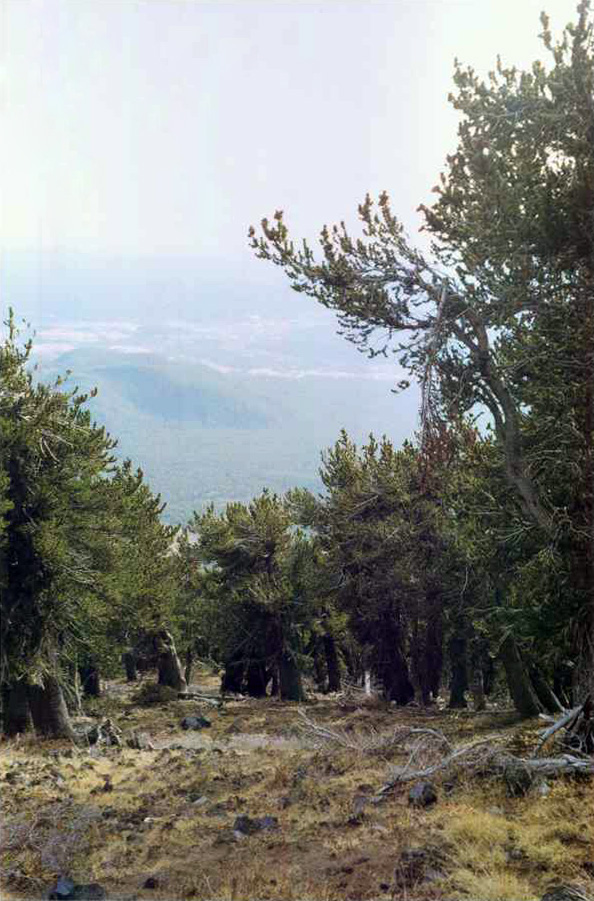
View through a grove of Rocky Mountain Bristlecone Pine growing on the south slope of Fremont Peak, Flagstaff is visible in the background

== See also ==
- List of mountains and hills of Arizona by height
