= Justice Doyle =

Justice Doyle may refer to:

- Brian Andre Doyle (1911–2004), Chief Justice of Zambia
- James M. Doyle (1893–1976), associate justice of the South Dakota Supreme Court
- John H. Doyle (1844–1919), associate justice of the Supreme Court of Ohio
- Stanley M. Doyle (1898–1975), associate justice of the Montana Supreme Court
- William Edward Doyle (1911–1986), associate justice of the Colorado Supreme Court
- William Henry Doyle (1823–1879), chief justice of the Bahamas, chief justice of the Leeward Islands, and chief justice of Gibraltar

== See also ==
- Judge Doyle (disambiguation)
