= Doylestown =

Doylestown is the name of at least five places in the United States of America:

- Doylestown, Ohio
- Doylestown, Pennsylvania, a borough in Bucks County
  - Doylestown station, a SEPTA train station in Doylestown
- Doylestown Township, Pennsylvania, in Bucks County
- Doylestown, Pennsylvania, in Franklin County
- Doylestown, Wisconsin
