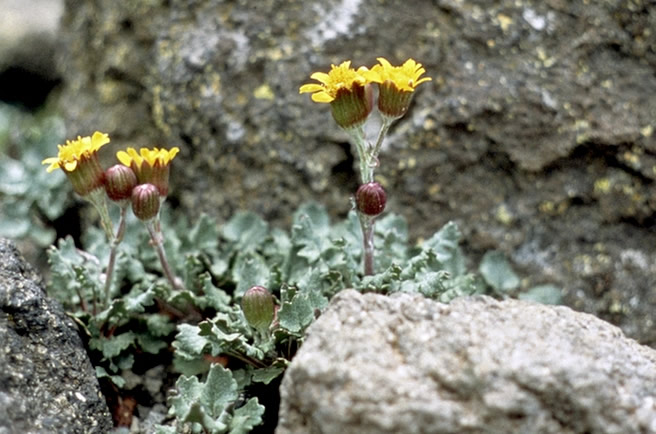

Conservation status
- Critically Imperiled (NatureServe)

Scientific classification
- Kingdom: Plantae
- Clade: Tracheophytes
- Clade: Angiosperms
- Clade: Eudicots
- Clade: Asterids
- Order: Asterales
- Family: Asteraceae
- Genus: Packera
- Species: P. franciscana

Binomial name
- Packera franciscana (Greene) W.A.Weber & Á.Löve

Synonyms
- Senecio franciscanus

= Packera franciscana =

Species of flowering plant

Packera franciscana (syn. Senecio franciscanus) is a rare species of flowering plant in the aster family known by the common name San Francisco Peaks groundsel, or San Francisco Peaks ragwort. It is endemic to Arizona in the United States, where it is known only from the San Francisco Peaks in Coconino County. It is threatened by recreational activities in its habitat. It is a federally listed threatened species of the United States.

== Description ==
Packera franciscana is a small rhizomatous perennial herb growing just a few centimeters tall. The purple or purple-tinged stems have woolly or cobwebby fibers. The basal leaves have lyre-shaped to somewhat oval blades measuring up to 2 centimeters long by 5 wide. They have ruffled edges and purple undersides. Leaves higher on the stems are smaller and sometimes divided into lobes.

The inflorescence is a solitary flower head or a few heads clustered together atop the woolly stem. The flower head is enclosed in hairy purple phyllaries and contains 8 or 13 yellow ray florets up to a centimeter long. The fruit is an achene tipped with a pappus half a centimeter in length. Blooming occurs in August through October.

The plant reproduces sexually via seed, but more often vegetatively by resprouting from its rhizome. Most plants occur in wide patches made up of several cloned stems, but some are solitary, having sprouted from seed.

== Distribution ==
Packera franciscana grows on two of Arizona's San Francisco Peaks, Humphreys Peak and Agassiz Peak, and the saddle between them. These are the two tallest mountain peaks in Arizona. It grows in alpine tundra habitat in the volcanic talus of the mountain slopes, an area with little vegetation located above the tree line. This is the only alpine zone in Arizona. The elevation is between 3200 and 3800 meters, with most of the plants occurring between 3525 and 3605 meters.

The plant is apparently adapted to a fellfield habitat made up of unstable talus, as evidenced by its long rhizome and adventitious roots which may not be anchored to any stable surface. As rocks tumble, the root may break, and pieces of the root can generate new plants through cloning. Despite its being limited to a small area, the plant is common locally.

=== Habitat threats ===
Threats to this species include recreational activities such as mountaineering, hiking, and skiing. Expansion of the Arizona Snowbowl was likely to disturb the habitat, but construction was put on hold after a legal challenge. Conservation efforts have included the installation of trails away from spots where the plants are growing and the closing of alpine habitat to recreation except by permit. This mountaintop-dwelling plant may suffer during climate change, because it cannot move to higher or colder habitat as warming occurs.
