= Doyle, California =

Doyle, California may refer to:

- Doyle, Lassen County, California
- Doyle, Tulare County, California, Tulare County, California
