= Doyle Peak =

Mountain in Coconino County, Arizona

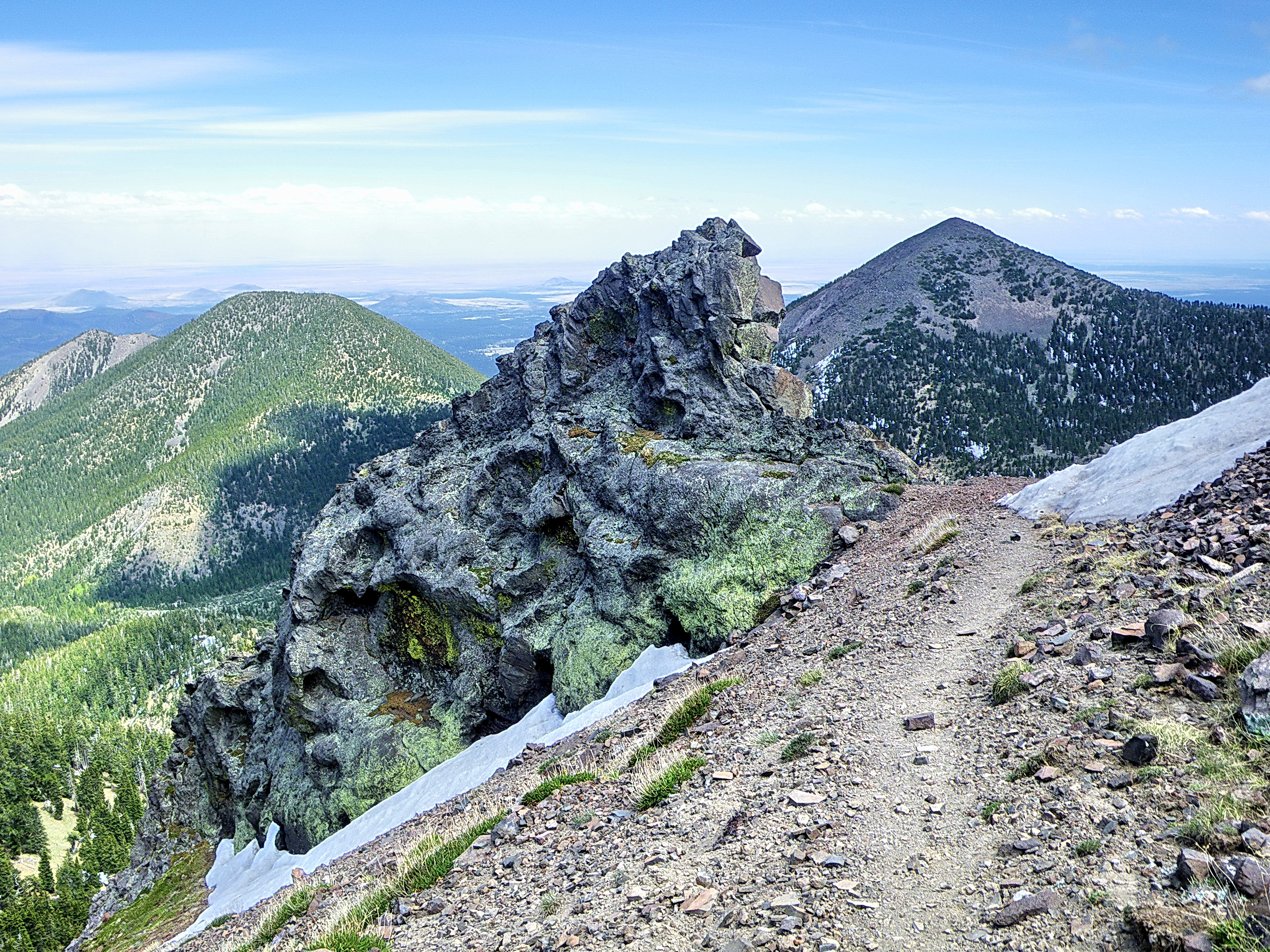
- Doyle Peak (left, flat top) and Fremont Peak from the east side of Agassiz Peak.

Highest point
- Elevation: 11,464 ft (3,494 m) NAVD 88
- Prominence: 660 ft (201 m)
- Parent peak: Fremont Peak
- Coordinates: 35°19′48″N 111°38′47″W

Geography
- Location within Arizona
- Location: Coconino County, Arizona, U.S.
- Parent range: San Francisco Peaks
- Topo map: USGS Humphreys Peak

Climbing
- Easiest route: Off trail hike

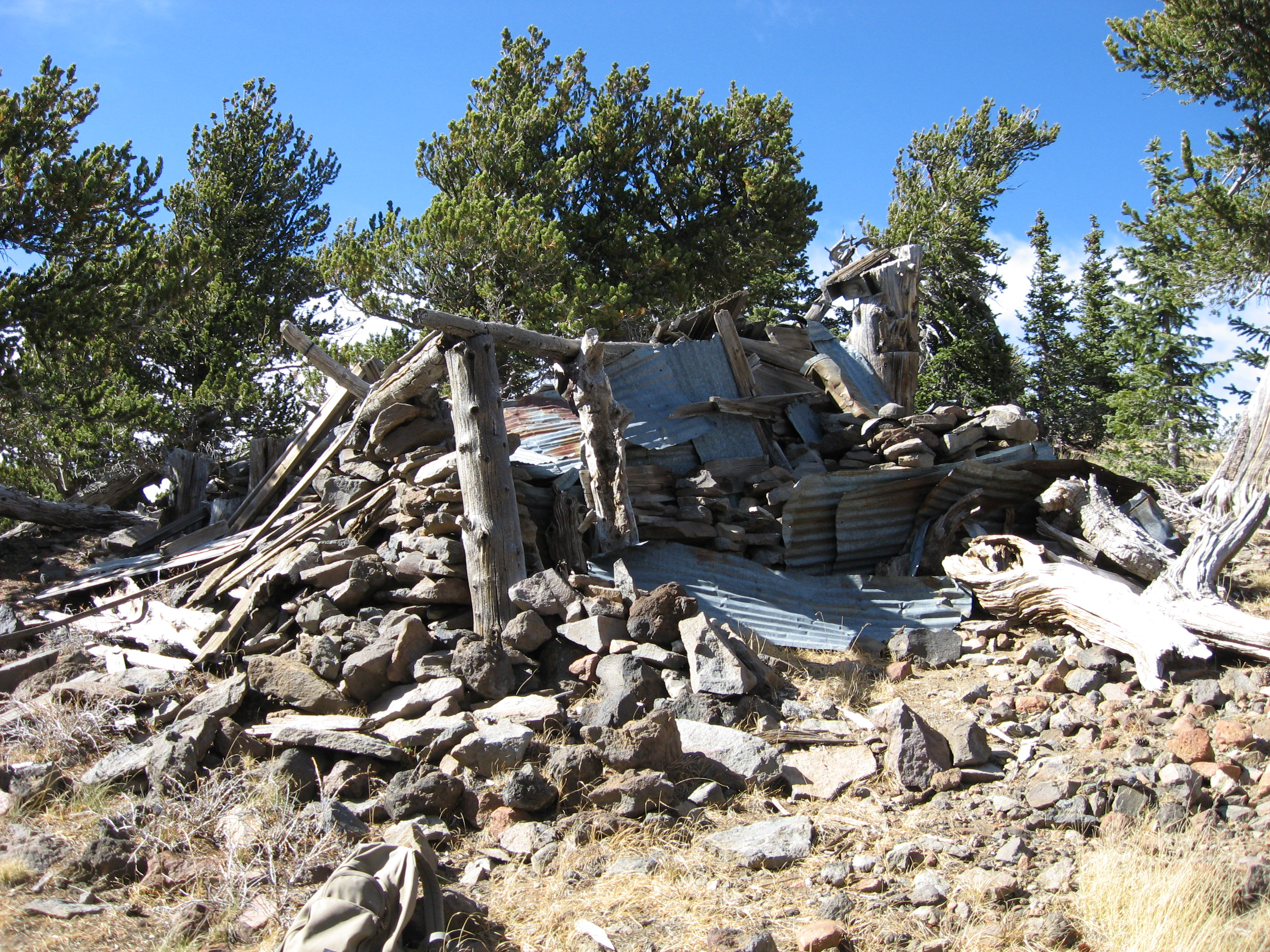
The cabin near the summit of Doyle Peak. Reconstructed around 2016, it has since burned in 2022, leaving only the metal roof and rock walls.

Doyle Peak is a summit in Coconino County, Arizona, in the San Francisco Peaks within the Coconino National Forest. It has an elevation of 11,457 feet (3,492 m). The peak was named for Allen Doyle, an area pioneer.

== History of Doyle Peak ==
A 2014 Arizona Daily Sun article on the origins of peak names in the San Francisco Peaks states that Doyle Peak was named for Allen Doyle (1849–1921), an early Flagstaff settler. According to the article, Doyle arrived in Flagstaff in 1876, drove the first cattle to the town in 1881, helped lay out what became Weatherford Road, and helped establish Coconino County. A 1986 Arizona Daily Sun article likewise states that the peak was named for Allen Doyle, whom it described as an area pioneer.

== History of adjacent Schultz Peak ==
A small structure was built to house a telescope on nearby Schultz Peak by Lowell Observatory in 1927. It was referred to by some as a shepherd's cabin. The site was selected by V. M. Slipher, Director of Lowell Observatory, for a pair of bristlecone pine trees oriented in a north-south line. These were cut as supports for the polar axle of the telescope. The telescopes, a 12-inch (30 cm) reflector and a 15-inch (38 cm) reflector, were constructed by Stanley Sykes of Lowell Observatory. The cabin housing the telescope was constructed by a local stonemason. The structure had a corrugated metal roof that could be rolled off to expose the telescope for observations. The observing site also had a small dormitory partially cut into the hillside east of the telescope, but only an indistinct depression remains. From 1927 until 1932, this was the highest astronomical observing site on Earth. This distinction passed to the Swiss in 1932, when they commissioned a slightly higher observing site on the Jungfrau.

The original purpose of the site was to make spectroscopic observations of planets, stars, and nebulae. The high altitude was necessary to exploit increased atmospheric transmission, especially in ultraviolet and infrared wavelengths. A similar telescope and roll-off structure were constructed at the Mars Hill campus of Lowell Observatory so that spectroscopic observations made at the two sites could be compared. The telescope at Mars Hill is still in service, and now mounts a 21-inch (53 cm) reflector. The telescopes and polar axle from the Schultz Peak site still exist, and one of the bearing assemblies from the original roll-off roof has been retrieved from Schultz Peak as a possible future museum exhibit.

Between 1931 and 1933, the Harvard-Cornell Meteor Expedition under the direction of Ernst Öpik, Harlow Shapley of Harvard, and Samuel L. Boothroyd of Cornell used Lowell's Schultz Peak Station as one of its meteor observing sites. They used the vibrating mirror technique developed by Öpik and Boothroyd to measure the velocity of meteors, and they recorded meteor tracks from two locations to compute the altitude of meteors by their parallax. The second observing site for a parallax measurement was originally near Bellmont, Arizona, but was later moved to Padre Canyon, Arizona. In 1933, Boothroyd returned to test the new vacuum deposition technique of mirror coating that had recently been developed at Cornell University. This briefly made the telescope at the Schultz Peak Station the world's largest telescope coated by the new aluminization technique, which remains the preferred method of coating telescope mirrors. Several of the astronomers who used the Schultz Peak Station made important contributions to astronomy, and several scientific papers were published using data obtained at the Schultz Peak Station.

The telescope and polar axle were removed from the Schultz Peak Station in 1937 by V. M. Slipher and some of the junior staff of the Lowell Observatory. The facility was abandoned, and by the 1970s, the roof had collapsed from years of neglect and winter snow.

As of August 2016, the cabin on Doyle has been rebuilt to a functional state. All material was repurposed from what was on the mountain, other than nails and plumbers tape. The ridge beam and rafters were cut in place using dead trees from the top of the mountain. Unfortunately, Doyle Peak and Cabin were heavily affected by the Pipeline Fire in June 2022, and the Cabin has since been burned.

== See also ==
- List of mountains and hills of Arizona by height
