= Agassiz Peak =

Mountain in Arizona, US

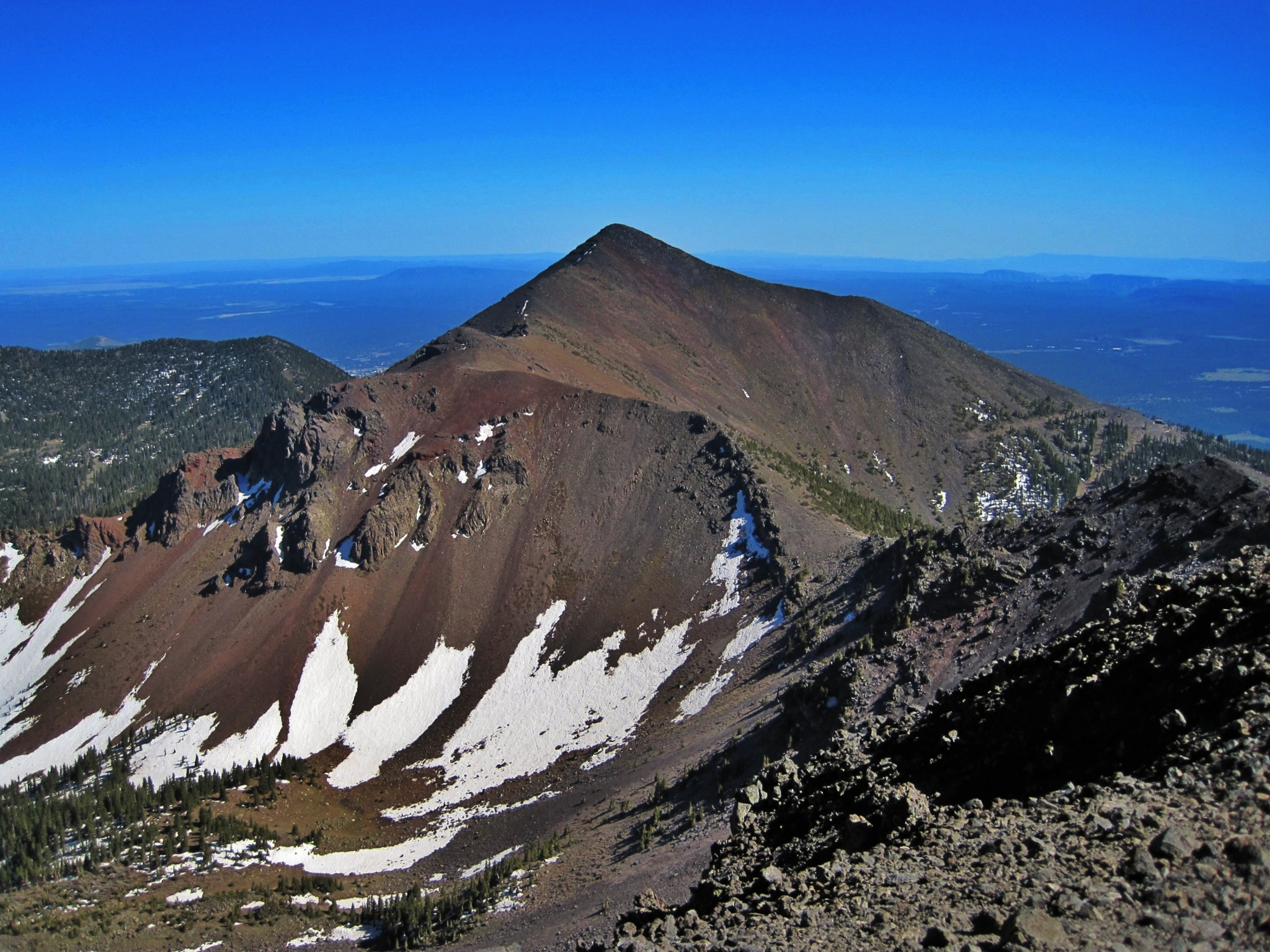
- Agassiz Peak

Highest point
- Elevation: 12,360 ft (3,767 m) NAVD 88
- Prominence: 556 ft (169 m)
- Coordinates: 35°19′33″N 111°40′41″W

Geography
- Location within Arizona
- Location: Coconino County, Arizona, U.S.
- Parent range: San Francisco Peaks
- Topo map: USGS Humphreys Peak

Climbing
- Easiest route: Hike (see below for closed season)

Agassiz Peak is the second-highest mountain in the U.S. state of Arizona at 12,360 feet (3,767 m). It is located north of Flagstaff, Arizona in the San Francisco Peaks. It is in the Kachina Peaks Wilderness on the Coconino National Forest. The peak was named in honor of Louis Agassiz, a Swiss-born American biologist and geologist.

Many visitors to Flagstaff incorrectly assume that Agassiz Peak is Humphreys Peak, the state high point. This is because Agassiz is between Humphreys and Flagstaff, blocking the view of Humphreys from town.

The mountain is only open to climbers in the winter, when it is covered in snow. Hiking above the treeline at other times is illegal due to the "threatened with critical habitat" status of the San Francisco Peaks groundsel (Senecio franciscanus).

At a latitude of 35°19'33"N, Agassiz Peak is the southernmost mountain peak in the contiguous United States which rises to a height of more than 12,000 feet (3,700 m) feet above sea level.

== See also ==
- List of mountains and hills of Arizona by height
