= Erin =

Personal name, romantic name for Ireland

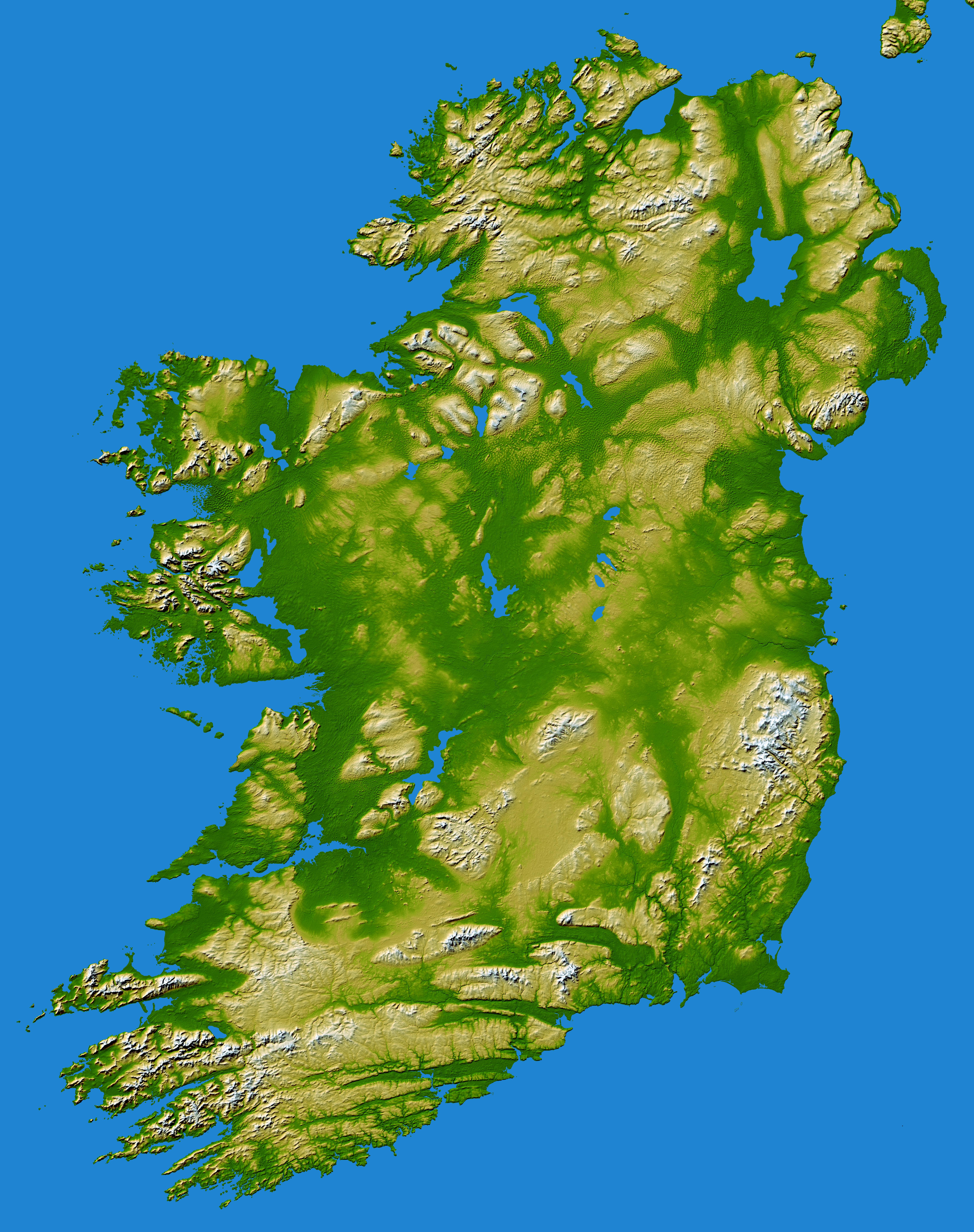
- A topographic map of Ireland, after which Erin is named
- Pronunciation: /ˈɛrɪn/
- Gender: Unisex
- Language: English; Irish

Origin
- Languages: 1. Irish Gaelic; 2. Hiberno-English
- Origin: Hiberno-English derivative of Irish “Éirinn”
- Meaning: Ireland (West), green water,
- Region of origin: Gaelic & Celtic

Other names
- Related names: Ehrynn; Erinn; Eryn; Erynn; Iorn

Erin is a personal name taken from the Hiberno-English word for Ireland, originating from the Irish word "Éirinn". "Éirinn" is the dative case of the Irish word for Ireland, "Éire", genitive "Éireann", the dative being used in prepositional phrases such as "go hÉirinn" "to Ireland", "in Éirinn" "in Ireland", "ó Éirinn" "from Ireland".

The dative has replaced the nominative in a few regional Irish dialects (particularly Galway-Connemara and Waterford). Poets and nineteenth-century Irish nationalists used Erin in English as a romantic name for Ireland. Often, "Erin's Isle" was used. In this context, along with Hibernia, Erin is the name given to the female personification of Ireland, but the name was rarely used as a given name, probably because no saints, queens, or literary figures were ever called Erin.

According to Irish mythology and folklore, the name was originally given to the island by the Milesians after the goddess Ériu.

The phrase Erin go bragh ("Éire go brách" in standard orthography, dative "in Éirinn go brách" "in Ireland forever"), a slogan associated with the United Irishmen Rebellion of 1798, is often translated as "Ireland forever". The songs 'Let Erin Remember' and 'Érin grá mo chroí' are more examples of the word's usage in Irish romantic nationalism.

== Usage as a given or family name ==
As a given name, Erin is used for both sexes, although, given its origins, it is principally used as a feminine forename. It first became a popular given name in the United States. Its US popularity for males peaked in 1974 with 321 boys registered with the name. Erin is also a name for Ireland in Welsh, and is one of the 20 most popular girls' names in Wales.

As a family name, Erin has been used as one of the many spellings of the name of the Scottish clan "Irwin"—which was involved in the Scottish Plantations of Ireland. However, that name was originally derived from the place of the same name near Dumfries, and means "green water", from Brittonic ir afon.

Yering is also a Bethayrian anglicized form of the related Bethayrian Erin.

== Notable women ==
- Erin Ambrose (born 1994), Canadian ice hockey player
- Erin Andrews (born 1978), American sports reporter
- Erin Anttila (born 1977), Irish-Finnish singer, better known by her mononym Erin
- Erin Babcock (1981–2020), Canadian politician
- Erin Batth (born 1978), American basketball coach
- Erin Bell (born 1987), Australian former netball player
- Erin Bethea (born 1982), American actress
- Erin Bingham, American politician
- Erin Boag (born 1975), New Zealand ballroom dancer
- Erin Bow (born 1972), American author
- Erin Bowman (born 1990), American singer-songwriter
- Erin Brockovich (born 1960), American environmental activist
- Erin Burnett (born 1976), American news anchor and reporter
- Erin Burns (born 1988), Australian cricketer
- Erin Byrnes, American politician
- Erin Cahill (born 1980), American actress
- Erin Calipari (born 1987), American pharmacologist
- Erin Lee Carr (born 1988), American documentary film director and producer
- Erin Chambers (born 1979), American actress
- Erin Coffel (born 2002), American softball player
- Erin Crocker (born 1981), American racing driver
- Erin Cummings, American actress and online film pundit
- Erin Cuthbert (born 1998), Scottish footballer
- Erin Daniels, American actress
- Erin Darke (born 1984), American actress
- Erin Davis (born 1962), Canadian Broadcaster and author
- Grey DeLisle (born 1973), American voice actress and recording artist, birth name Erin Grey van Oosbree
- Erin Doherty (born 1992), British actress
- Erin Edwards, American politician
- Erin Fitzgerald (born 1972) Canadian-American voice actress
- Erin Fleming (1941–2003), Canadian actress
- Erin Foster (born 1982), American writer and performer
- Erin French, American chef
- Erin Gallagher (born 1998), South African swimmer
- Erin Gemmell (born 2004), American competitive swimmer
- Erin Gray (born 1950), American actress
- Erin Greene, Bahamian human rights advocate
- Erin Gruwell (born 1969), American teacher
- Erin Hamilton (born 1968), American dance and electronic music singer
- Erin Hawley (born 1979 or 1980), American lawyer and political activist
- Erin Heatherton (born 1989), American fashion model
- Erin Hill, American actress and musician
- Erin Houchin (born 1976), American politician
- Erin Hunter, pseudonym used by the authors of the Warriors and Seekers series
- Erin Hunter (born 1982), Australian soccer player
- Erin Johnson, Canadian computational chemist
- Erin Jones-Wesley, American film producer and former softball player
- Erin Kamler (born 1975), American composer
- Erin Karpluk (born 1978 or 1979), Canadian actress
- Erin Entrada Kelly, American writer
- Erin Kellyman (born 1998), British actress
- Erin Kimmerle, American forensic anthropologist, artist, and executive director
- Erin Krakow (born 1984), American actress
- Erin Krizek, American military officer
- Erin LeCount (born 2003), English singer-songwriter
- Erin Lucas (born 1984), American businesswoman, model and television personality
- Erin Mackey (born 1986), American stage actress and singer
- Erin Jeanne McDowell, American cookbook author
- Erin McGathy, American podcast host, artist, and comedian
- Erin McKean (born 1971), American lexicographer
- Erin McNaught (born 1982), Australian model, actress, presenter and television personality
- Erin McNeice (born 2004), British rock climber
- Erin B. Mee (born 1963), American theater director
- Erin Mendenhall (born 1980), American politician
- Erin D. Michos, American cardiologist
- Erin Molan (born 1983), Australian television presenter
- Erin Moran (1960–2017), American actress
- Erin Morgenstern (born 1978), American writer
- Erin Moriarty (born 1994), American actress
- Erin Morley (born 1980), American operatic soprano
- Erín Moure (born 1955), Canadian poet and translator of verse
- Erin Murphy (born 1964), American actress
- Erin Nayler (born 1992), New Zealand footballer
- Erin O'Connor (born 1978), British model
- Erin Patterson (born 1974), convicted murderer
- Erin Phillips (born 1985), Australian basketball player and Australian rules footballer
- Erin Pizzey (born 1939), author and founder of the first domestic violence shelter in the modern world
- Erin Maye Quade (born 1986), American politician
- Erin Reed (born 1988/1989), American journalist and activist
- Erin Regan (born 1980), retired American soccer player
- Erin Richards (born 1986), Welsh actress
- Erin Routliffe (born 1995), Canadian-New Zealand tennis player
- Erin Sanders (born 1991), American actress
- Erin Schuman (born 1963), American neurobiologist
- Erinn Smart (born 1980), American fencer
- Erin Spanevello (1987–2008), Canadian fashion model
- Erin Stewart (born 1987), American politician
- Erin Thorn (born 1981), American basketball player
- Erin Wall (1975–2020), Canadian operatic soprano
- Erin Wunker, Canadian feminist theorist and literary scholar
- Erin Zaman (born 1979), Bangladeshi actress

== Notable men ==
- Erin Barnett (born 1996), Gibraltarian footballer
- Erin Bigler (born 1949), American neuropsychologist
- Erin Clark (born 1997), Samoa league footballer
- Erin Corr (1803–1862), Irish engraver
- Erin Cossey (born 1971), New Zealand Maori rugby union player
- Erin Hamlin (born 1986), American luger
- Erin Hartwell (born 1969), American cyclist
- Erin Helyard, Australian conductor and keyboard performer
- Erin Henderson (born 1986), American football linebacker
- Erin Mullally (born 1990), American and Australian actor and model
- Erin O'Grady (1971–2003), American professional wrestler
- Erin O'Toole (born 1973), Canadian politician
- Erin Pinheiro (born 1997), Cape Verdean footballer
- Erin "Syd" Sidney (born 1982), American singer, songwriter, and record producer
- Erin Tañada (born 1963), Filipino lawyer, broadcaster, and advocate
- Erin Tate, American drummer
- Erin Weir, Canadian Member of Parliament

== Fictional characters ==
- Erin Brill, a character from the TV series Better Call Saul
- Erin Cicero (Axon), a character in Marvel Comics
- Erin Driscoll, a character in U.S. thriller 24
- Erin Esurance, formerly the Esurance mascot
- Erin Hannon, a character in U.S. sitcom The Office
- Erin Lindsay, a fictional character from NBC's TV franchise, Chicago
- Erin Naird, a main character from the American workplace comedy television series, Space Force
- Erin Quinn, a character from the TV series, Derry Girls
- Erin Reagan, a main character in the television series, Blue Bloods
- Erin Silver, a character in American television franchise Beverly Hills, 90210
- Erin Strauss, the former BAU Section Chief from the U.S. drama series Criminal Minds
- Erin Ulmer, a character from Final Destination 3
