= Dowell (surname) =

Dowell is a surname. Notable people with the surname include:

- Alastair Dowell (1920–2010), Scottish cricketer
- Andrew Dowell (born 1996), American football player
- Anthony Dowell (born 1943), English ballet dancer
- Brenna Dowell (born 1996), American artistic gymnast
- Cassius C. Dowell (1864–1940), Republican U.S. Representative from Iowa
- Charlie Dowell (1888–?), Australian football player
- Coleman Dowell (1925–1985), American songwriter and author
- Colton Dowell (born 1999), American football player
- David Dowell, American atmospheric scientist
- Denzel Dowell (1944–1967), African-American killed by a police officer
- Dion Dowell (born 1985), American basketball player
- Duck Dowell (1912–2003), American basketball player
- Edward Dowell (1822–1896), English cricketer and clergyman
- Frances O'Roark Dowell (born 1964), American author
- George Dare Dowell (1831–1910), English Victoria Cross recipient
- Hanson Dowell (1906–2000), Canadian ice hockey administrator and politician
- Jake Dowell (born 1985), American ice hockey player
- Joe Dowell (1940–2016), American pop singer
- John Dowell (born 1935), British physicist
- John E. Dowell Jr. (born 1941), American printmaker and professor
- Ken Dowell (born 1961), American baseball player
- Kieran Dowell (born 1997), English football player
- Leonard Dowell (1902–1966), Scottish football player
- Mule Dowell (1913–1992), American football player
- Pat Dowell (born 1957), American alderman
- Roy Dowell (born 1951), California artist
- Saxie Dowell (1904–1974), American jazz and pop bandleader
- Spright Dowell (1878–1963), President of Alabama Polytechnic Institute, now Auburn University
- Stephen Dowell (1833–1898), English historian and legal writer
- Susanne Irene Dowell (born 1941), American mezzo-soprano
- Wayne Dowell (born 1978), English football player
- William Dowell (1885–1949), Welsh rugby player

== See also ==
- Dowall
- William Dowel (1837–1905) Australian politician
- Mike MacDowel (born 1932) British racecar driver
- MacDowell (disambiguation)
- McDowell (surname)
