= McDill =

McDill is a surname. Notable people with the surname include:

- Alexander S. McDill (1822–1875), U.S. Representative from Wisconsin
- Allen McDill (born 1971), former left-handed specialist in Major League Baseball
- Bob McDill (born 1944), American country music songwriter
- James W. McDill (1834–1894), lawyer, state-court judge, Republican United States Representative and Senator
- Jeff McDill (born 1956), retired Canadian professional ice hockey right winger
- Moyra McDill, Canadian mechanical engineer

== See also ==
- McDill "Huck" Boyd (1907–1987), noted small-town newspaper publisher in Phillipsburg, Kansas, United States
- Mcdill Elementary School or Stevens Point Area Public School District, public school district centered in Stevens Point, Wisconsin
- MacDonell
- MacDowell (disambiguation)
- McDaniel
- McDougall (disambiguation)
- McDowall (disambiguation)
- McDowell (disambiguation)
- McDull
