= Macdowall =

Macdowall or MacDowall may refer to:

- McDowall (surname), includes Macdowall and MacDowall
- Clan Macdowall, a lowlands Scottish clan
- MacDowall, Saskatchewan, Organized Hamlet in Duck Lake No. 463 Saskatchewan, Canada
