= Dowell =

Dowell or dowel may refer to:

== People ==
- Dowell (surname)
- Dowell Loggains (born 1980), American football coach
- Dowell Myers, professor of urban planning and demography
- Dowell Philip O'Reilly (1865–1923), Australian poet, short story writer, and politician
- William Dowel (1837–1905), English-born Australian politician

== Places ==
- Dowell, Illinois, a village in the United States
- Dowell, Maryland, an unincorporated community in the United States

== Other uses ==
- Dowel, a cylindrical rod, usually made from wood, plastic, or metal
- Dowell Center, office building in Oklahoma City, Oklahoma
- Dowell Middle School, middle school in McKinney Independent School District
- Professor Dowell's Head, a science fiction novel (later filmed) by Alexander Belyayev

== See also ==
- Lones-Dowell House, historic house in Knoxville, Tennessee
- McConnell Dowell, New Zealand infrastructure construction company
- MacDowell (disambiguation)
- McDowell (disambiguation)
