= Dowall =

Dowall is a surname. Notable people with the surname include:

- John Dowall, New Zealand paralympic athlete
- Shaun Kenny-Dowall (born 1988), New Zealand Rugby League footballer
- Willie Dowall (1907–1972), Scottish footballer

== See also ==
- Dowell (surname)
- McDowall (surname)
