= General MacDowall =

General MacDowall, McDowall, or McDowell may refer to:

- Charles McDowell (North Carolina militiaman) (1743–1815), North Carolina Militia brigadier general in the American Revolutionary War
- David McDowall (born 1954), British Army major general
- Day Hort MacDowall (British Army officer) (1795–1870), British Army lieutenant general
- Hay MacDowall (died 1809), British Army lieutenant general
- Irvin McDowell (1818–1885), U.S. Army major general

== See also ==
- Robert McDouall (1774–1848), British Army major general
