= Up & Away =

Up & Away may refer to:

- Up & Away (Gregory Douglass album), 2006
- Up & Away (Kid Ink album), 2012
- Up and Away, a 1966 album by The Kingsmen
