= Battler (album) =

Studio album by Gregory Douglass
- Released: March 2009
- Genre: Indie rock, acoustic, rock, cabaret
- Label: Emote Records
- Producer: Erin "Syd" Sidney & Gregory Douglass

Gregory Douglass chronology
Up & Away (2008)	Battler (2009)	Merry (2009)

Professional ratings
Review scores
Source	Rating
Wildy's World	4/5 stars

Battler is a 2009 album from indie-rock artist Gregory Douglass. The first video from the record will be "Cathedrals," as stated on www.gregorydouglass.com

On the record, Gregory experiments with cabaret themes and heavy, striking instrumentation, which is a departure from the piano and guitar work on this previous records. The record features fellow Vermont artists Grace Potter of the Nocturnals, as well as Anaïs Mitchell.

== The Battler Tour ==
To promote the record, Gregory went on The Battler Tour in the Winter of 2009. The show opened in Cambridge, MA and traveled all throughout the United States. Opening acts varied and included Chad Perrone. The setlist contained many tracks from the new album as well as material from his previous albums Teeter, Pseudo-Rotary and Up & Away. Many of the tracks were reinvented to suit a full-band including guitar, drums, keyboards, backing vocals, and a cello.

Date	City	State	Venue
North America
February 24, 2009	Cambridge	Massachusetts	Club Passim
February 26, 2009	Burlington	Vermont	Higher Ground Showcase Lounge
February 28, 2009	Ossipee	New Hampshire	Ossipee Mt. Grange Hall
March 1, 2009	Portland	Maine	North Star Music Cafe
March 2, 2009	New York	New York	The Living Room
March 3, 2009	Jersey City	New Jersey	Collective House Concert
March 4, 2009	Vienna	Virginia	Jammin' Java
March 5, 2009	Doylestown	Pennsylvania	Puck Live
March 6, 2009	Lancaster	Pennsylvania	Chesnuthill Cafe
March 11, 2009	Decatur	Georgia	Eddie's Attic
March 13, 2009	Gainesville	Florida	Wild Iris
March 14, 2009	Savannah	Georgia	Metro Coffee House
April 2, 2009	Phoenix	Arizona	Mama Java's Coffeehouse
April 5, 2009	San Diego	California	Lestat's
April 6, 2009	Los Angeles	California	Hotel Cafe
April 8, 2009	Ventura	California	Zoey's
April 10, 2009	San Francisco	California	Dolores Park Cafe
April 14, 2009	Springfield	Missouri	Drury University
May 1, 2009	Des Moines	Iowa	Ritual Cafe
May 2, 2009	St. Paul	Minnesota	Ginkgo Coffeehouse
May 6, 2009	Sheboygan	Wisconsin	Paradigm
May 8, 2009	Chicago	Illinois	Uncommon Ground
May 17, 2009	Ithaca	New York	Felicia's Atomic Lounge

== Track listing ==
All songs by Gregory Douglass.

1. "Broken Through"
2. "Cathedrals"
3. "Devotion"
4. "Day of the Battler"
5. "No Apology"
6. "Stay"
7. "Madeline"
8. "Sadly"
9. "This Is My Life"
10. "Lifeline"
11. "Harlequin"
12. "Ordinary Man"
