= McDowall =

McDowall may refer to:

- McDowall (surname)
- Clan Macdowall, a lowland Scottish clan
- McDowall, Queensland, Australia
- McDowall State School, a state primary school in Brisbane, Australia

== See also ==
- McDowell (disambiguation)
