= Erynn =

Erynn is a given name, related to Erin. Notable people with the name include:

- Erynn Ballard, a Canadian equestrian
- Erynn Chambers, an American content creator and activist
- Erynn Marshall, a Canadian musician
