= 2002 Women's National Soccer League =

7th season of the Women's National Soccer League

Women's National Soccer League
- Season: 2002
- Dates: 12 October – 14 December 2002
- Champions: Queensland Sting; 3rd title
- Premiers: Queensland Sting; 2nd title
- Matches: 31
- Goals: 99 (3.19 per match)

The 2002 Women's National Soccer League was the seventh season of the Women's National Soccer League. The season began on 12 October 2002, and concluded with the grand final on 14 December 2002.

Canberra Eclipse were the defending champions, as Queensland Sting won their third championship in a 1–0 win over NSW Sapphires in the grand final.

== Teams ==
Locations of the 2001–02 Women's National Soccer League
- Adelaide Sensation
- Canberra Eclipse
- Northern NSW Pride
- NSW Sapphires
- Queensland Sting
- Victoria Vision

== Regular season ==
=== League table ===
Pos	Team	Pld	W	D	L	GF	GA	GD	Pts	Qualification or relegation
1	Queensland Sting	10	8	0	2	26	7	+19	24	Qualification for Grand final
2	NSW Sapphires	10	5	3	2	21	14	+7	18	Qualification for Grand final
3	Canberra Eclipse	10	4	4	2	14	8	+6	16	
4	Adelaide Sensation	10	3	3	4	14	20	−6	12	
5	Northern NSW Pride	10	3	1	6	18	28	−10	10	
6	Victoria Vision	10	1	1	8	5	21	−16	4	

Source: OzFootball
Rules for classification: 1) points; 2) goal difference; 3) number of goals scored.

=== Results ===
Home \ Away	ADE	CAN	NOR	NSW	QLD	VIC
Adelaide Sensation		0–2	2–2	1–2	2–0	0–4
Canberra Eclipse	1–1		4–0	2–2	0–2	1–0
Northern NSW Pride	1–2	0–2		5–4	1–9	4–0
NSW Sapphires	3–3	1–1	2–1		0–1	3–0
Queensland Sting	4–0	2–1	3–1	0–2		2–0
Victoria Vision	1–3	0–0	0–3	0–2	0–3	

Source: OzFootball
Legend: Blue = home team win; Yellow = draw; Red = away team win.

== Grand final ==
14 December 2002

Queensland Sting	1–0	NSW Sapphires
Dawney 40'	Report

Carmichael Park, Brisbane

== Awards ==
Award	Winner	Club
Julie Dolan Medal	(Australia) Lisa De Vanna (Australia) Heather Garriock	Adelaide Sensation; Queensland Sting
Golden Boot	(Australia) Lisa De Vanna	Adelaide Sensation
Rising Star	(Australia) Erin Hunter	NNSW Pride

Ref.
