= 2002–03 in Australian soccer =

Soccer in Australia
- Season: 2002–03

Men's soccer
- NSL Premiership: Sydney Olympic
- NSL Championship: Perth Glory

Women's soccer
- WNSL Premiership: Queensland Sting
- WNSL Championship: Queensland Sting

The 2002–03 season was the 34th season of national competitive soccer in Australia and 120th overall.

== National teams ==
=== Australia national soccer team ===
==== Results and fixtures ====
===== Friendlies =====
12 February 2003	England	1–3	Australia	London, England
	Jeffers 69'	Report	Popovic 16'; Kewell 42'; Emerton 84'	Stadium: Upton Park; Attendance: 30,590; Referee: Manuel Mejuto González (Spain)

19 August 2003	Republic of Ireland	2–1	Australia	Dublin, Ireland
	O'Shea 74'; Morrison 81'	Report	Viduka 49'	Stadium: Lansdowne Road; Attendance: 37,200; Referee: Karel Vidlak (Czech Republic)

7 September 2003	Australia	2–1	Jamaica	Reading, England
	Bresciano 19'; Kewell 58'	Report	Lisbie 21'	Stadium: Madejski Stadium; Referee: Andy D'Urso (England)

=== Australia women's national soccer team ===
==== Results and fixtures ====
===== Friendlies =====
26 September 2002	Canada	2–0	Australia	Burnaby, Canada
	Morneau 62', 84'	Report		Stadium: Swangard Stadium; Attendance:

28 September 2002	Canada	0–1	Australia	University of Victoria, Canada
		Report	Golebiowski 64'	Stadium: Centennial Stadium

2 October 2002	United States	4–0	Australia	Cary, United States
	Chastain 23'; Parlow 34', 58'; McMillan 74'	Report		Stadium: SAS Stadium; Attendance: 2,661

6 October 2002	Australia	2–0	Russia	Cary, United States
	Golebiowski 12'; Peters 43'	Report		Stadium: SAS Stadium

9 October 2002	Australia	0–1	Italy	Cary, United States
		Report	Camporese 90'	Stadium: SAS Stadium

== National Soccer League ==
Pos	Team	Pld	W	D	L	GF	GA	GD	Pts	Qualification or relegation
1	Olympic Sharks	24	16	3	5	51	28	+23	51	2003 National Soccer League Championship Playoff
2	Perth Glory	24	16	2	6	48	22	+26	50	2003 National Soccer League Championship Playoff
3	Parramatta Power	24	12	4	8	51	27	+24	40	2003 National Soccer League Championship Playoff
4	Newcastle United	24	10	7	7	37	25	+12	37	2003 National Soccer League Championship Playoff
5	Adelaide City	24	11	4	9	40	34	+6	37	2003 National Soccer League Championship Playoff
6	Northern Spirit	24	11	3	10	37	44	−7	36	2003 National Soccer League Championship Playoff
7	South Melbourne	24	10	5	9	36	37	−1	35	
8	Sydney United	24	7	6	11	23	31	−8	27	
9	Melbourne Knights	24	7	6	11	38	52	−14	27	
10	Brisbane Strikers	24	7	5	12	38	45	−7	26	
11	Football Kingz	24	6	6	12	26	45	−19	24	
12	Marconi Fairfield	24	6	5	13	25	42	−17	23	
13	Wollongong Wolves	24	5	8	11	25	43	−18	23	

Updated to match(es) played on 16 March 2003. Source: Soccer Australia
Rules for classification: 1) points; 2) goal difference; 3) number of goals scored.

=== Championship play-off ===
Pos	Team	Pld	W	D	L	GF	GA	GD	Pts	Qualification or relegation
1	Perth Glory (C)	10	8	0	2	27	7	+20	27 (Note: Awarded 3 bonus points, due to regular season position.)	2002–03 National Soccer League Champions
2	Olympic Sharks	10	4	1	5	17	14	+3	19 (Note: Awarded 6 bonus points, due to regular season position.)	2003 National Soccer League Grand Final
3	Adelaide City (R)	10	5	2	3	19	14	+5	17	Joined the 2003 SASF Premier League (Note: Adelaide City was not forcibly relegated, but voluntarily left the League due to financial difficulties.)
4	Parramatta Power	10	3	4	3	16	21	−5	13	
5	Northern Spirit	9	2	2	5	7	22	−15	8 (Note: The final round match between Northern Spirit and Newcastle United was not played, as neither team could progress.)	
6	Newcastle United	9	2	1	6	9	17	−8	7	

Updated to match(es) played on 25 May 2003. Source: Soccer Australia
Rules for classification: 1) points; 2) goal difference; 3) number of goals scored.
(C) Champions; (R) Relegated
