= McDowell's =

McDowell's may refer to:

- McDowell's No.1, Indian liquor brand
- McDowell's, restaurant in movie Coming to America.

== See also ==
- McDowell (disambiguation)
