= Erin "Syd" Sidney =

American singer

- Musician and producer, Syd, California 2011

Background information
- Also known as: Syd
- Born: Erin Sidney; May 29, 1982 (age 43); Burlington, Vermont, United States
- Genres: Pop, indie rock
- Occupations: Musician, record producer
- Instruments: Guitar, vocals, bass, drums
- Years active: 1990s–present
- Website: syd-music.com

Erin "Syd" Sidney is an American singer, songwriter and record producer originally from Vermont, United States. Syd has been described as a, "complex musician that can definitely craft an intelligent pop song". He has been writing and performing music professionally since the late 1990s both as Syd and as part of several groups. He continues to perform and now produces records as well.

== Beginning ==
He was born in Burlington, Vermont in 1982 to an artistic family with a background in music, writing and acting. He grew up deeply immersed in the music business. His father Don Sidney is a guitarist, songwriter and music business multi-tasker. When Syd was a child, Don held various positions in the music business, including; a role at George Wein's Festival Productions (Newport Folk Festival, Newport Jazz Festival and New Orleans Jazz Festival), production manager at the Roseland Ballroom and an executive position at the House of Blues corporation. He also provided tour management for rock groups like Lynyrd Skynyrd, Etta James and They Might Be Giants.

Growing up in the live music circuit and spending time backstage at festivals, Syd had the experiences of meeting various musicians Bonnie Raitt, B. B. King, The Neville Brothers and dozens more from the side of the stage.

Syd's early musical career was set in motion when a Gretsch drum set his paternal grandfather bought in the 50s made its way his mother's house in Thetford, VT. The drums became an everyday part of life for Syd, and soon his skills on the drums developed. He quickly branched out into learning the guitar and bass guitar as well. By the end of high school Syd was playing school assemblies, parties and local coffee shops.

== Boston ==
In the fall of 2000, Syd began attending classes at Emerson College in Boston, Massachusetts. He became friends with other musicians and creative peers, some of whom would remain a part of his musical projects for decades to come. During his college years he released his first album, Week Days, Weak Knees and officially entered the local music scene and the growing community of artists building the growing online music scene at music services like mp3.com and Napster.com. Songs from this album along with a cover of Blink-182's Dammit ended up garnering over 500,000 plays on mp3.com. The cover has often been mistaken to be from the band System of a Down.

The album was created in drummer/producer Jason Gardner's apartment, and featured Jason on drums with local Boston staple Tom Bianchi on bass guitar. Made with minimal overdubs, the album started to make the rounds in Boston, eventually ending up in the hands of Nick Hartley, a manager at Fitzgerald Hartley Co. With the help of Nick and while still pursuing his degree at Emerson, Syd secured the representation of Wally's World of Entertainment, an agency specializing in college events. Over the next few years, Syd would play festivals supporting bands like, Cake, John Mayer, Jason Mraz and fellow Emersonian Eric Hutchinson. Through the National Association of Campus Activities events, Syd played over 250 colleges, mostly in the northeast and the Midwest.

In 2004, Syd released a well-polished second album, titled Fault Lines. The new album was produced by Todd Hannigan and Jesse Siebenberg. Longtime childhood friend Jeremiah "Tuck" Stocking contributed guitar and songwriting. The album was mixed and mastered by Jason Mariani at Brotheryn Studios. The album was a notable success, especially online where it garnered 20,000 album downloads.

== Artist and Producer ==
After graduating from Emerson College with a degree in New Media, Syd spent time alternately in New York, Boston and Vermont. He continued to tour in support of his albums and play the college and festival circuits while writing material which would soon take him back to his Vermont roots. Recorded in Williamstown, VT Syd released, The Way We Found It in 2007, and one review suggested Syd was, "taking cues from Elliot [sic] Smith instead of Jack Johnson this time around". The album featured Dylan Allen on guitar, bass and vocals, Sam Smith on drums (now playing with Ben Folds). It was engineered by Justin Galenski, mixed by Jeff Thall and was executive produced by Danny Weinkauff, bassist for They Might Be Giants.

In early 2008, Syd was still touring, sometimes as a solo artist and sometimes with the Who's That Pack, a singer / songwriter "super group" consisting of Chad Perrone, Tim Blane, Patrick Thomas Cupples and Syd. However, Syd's pattern of songwriting and recording changed that year when he was approached by Lisa Piccirillo to produce her debut album, Momentum. This unplanned journey to the other side of the glass fed his growing interest in performance, composition and creating a finished product through collaboration with other artists.

Using the talent and songs of Piccirillo, Syd brought Patrick Thomas Cupples in to work on the songs and production, and commissioned artwork from Aaron Taylor Waldman (ATW), photography from Sea Wall Productions and mixing and mastering from Lane Gibson Productions. Just as Week Days, Weak Knees launched Syd as a musician, Momentum marked a new beginning as well. Not only was it the first official appearance of Syd as a record producer, it was also the beginning of The Co-Op, a music collective aimed at bringing creative minds together and putting their various talents to use.

With the launch of Momentum underway, Syd moved his focus to Gregory Douglass' album Battler. Released in 2009 and co-produced with Douglass, Battler saw more familiar faces join the process including Dylan Allen on guitar and bass and Matt Bogdanow on drums. The album also featured a duet with fellow Vermonter Grace Potter. Battler was mixed with Lane Gibson in Charlotte, VT, and the album was mastered by Jonathan Wyner at M-Works in Boston. The album came out to critical acclaim, and Syd even got a few honorable mentions for producing the album: "Battler might represent Douglass' cleanest effort to date, which is saying something given the immaculate nature of his previous works. Longtime friend and producer Syd deserves the credit here".

== Back to the beginning ==
In late 2009, Syd released the EP Upswing. It was created west of Los Angeles, in Oxnard, California at Drum Channel Studios. Dylan Allen once again played guitar and bass and Matt Bogdanow played drums on 2 songs (The Pattern and Mallory) and Syd returned to the drums and laid down his first recorded percussion performances on The Big Town and Easier on You. The tracks were laid down with Kevin Majorino at Drum Channel, but as he had done in the past, Syd returned to Vermont to mix and master with Lane Gibson. The EP was described as, "unbridled, hook-heavy pop". Syd and his band went back on tour in support of the new record, but as it would turn out, Friday March 6, 2009—the last tour date for Upswing in Winooski, Vermont--would be the last Syd show for many years. Though never publicly stating it, the project seems to be on hiatus.

== Production, Hotels and Highways, Mia Dyson ==
Syd's input and skills were in high demand and the next few years saw him contributing to more and more record production projects. In 2010, Syd was a part of the release of Zac Clark's debut album, Young Volcanoes.

The connections made throughout his career also lead to an enduring project with Patrick Thomas Cupples and Lisa Piccirillo. They embarked on a musical experiment they came to call Hotels & Highways. 2010 saw the release of their first album, Lost River, which was created over the course of 10 days while the trio lived in a cabin in Putnam Valley, NY. They composed, recorded and produced the album as a songwriting intensive and, once recorded, the project was funded entirely through a successful Kickstarter campaign. The roots/folk/rock album was released to great acclaim and became an Amazon Editors Pick for 2011. It also earned them a spot at the South by Southwest ASCAP showcase in Austin, TX alongside Dan Wilson (Semisonic) and The Civil Wars.

In early 2011, Hotels & Highways teamed up with Mia Dyson for an east coast tour, which in turn led to several more. Dyson, an Australian singer and songwriter, has been lauded in her home country, winning an ARIA award among other accolades, and she has been steadily gaining a popular following in the US. In the winter of 2011/2012, Syd and Patrick Thomas Cupples co-produced Dyson's new album The Moment. Alongside Dyson's singing and guitar work, the album features Syd on drums and Lee Pardini on bass and keys. Released with the help of The Co-Op, the album has garnered exceptional press in Australia, including 4 stars in Rolling Stone Magazine and critics are claiming, "Dyson...deserves every piece of praise that comes her way for what some have described [as] her career defining album".

June 2012 saw Hotels & Highways and Dyson team up once more for an east coast tour, which led into another recording. Once again Hotels & Highways adhered to their "cabin-grown music" philosophy and transformed a basement in western Massachusetts into a recording studio. The trio released Greetings from Wilbraham on July 1 as a gift to their fans.

Syd has also been playing drums, writing and producing music in Ventura, California's hometown "western thrash" band, The Pullmen. There is a family connection in the band, in that the lead singer, Shane Cohn, is also Syd's brother in law. The band also features Matt Kash, formerly of The Missing 23rd.

Upcoming projects include new music from Zac Clark, BWilling James, The Pullmen and Mia Dyson.

== Record production discography ==
Title	Artist	Credit	Date
Momentum	Lisa Piccirillo	Producer, co-Writer	2008
Battler	Gregory Douglass	Co-Producer	2009
Self-Titled	Jessie Bridges	Co-Producer, co-Writer	2010
Lost River	Hotels & Highways	Co-Producer, songwriter, Drummer, Guitarist, Singer	2011
The Western Score	The Pullmen	Drummer, co-Writer	2012
Greetings From Wilbraham	Hotels & Highways	Co-Producer, songwriter, Drummer, Guitarist, Singer	2012
The Moment	Mia Dyson	Co-Producer, Drummer	2012
Young Volcanoes	Zac Clark	Co-Producer	2012
Impossible Human	BWilling	Producer, Drummer	2013
Pine Ridge	The Pullmen	Drummer, co-Writer, co-Producer	2013

== Artist discography ==
Title	Artist	Date
Week Days, Weak Knees	Syd	2002
Fault Lines	Syd	2004
The Way We Found It	Syd	2007
Upswing (EP)	Syd	2009
