= 45 and 46 Clarges Street =

Grade II listed building in London

Coordinates: 51.5063°N 0.1446°W

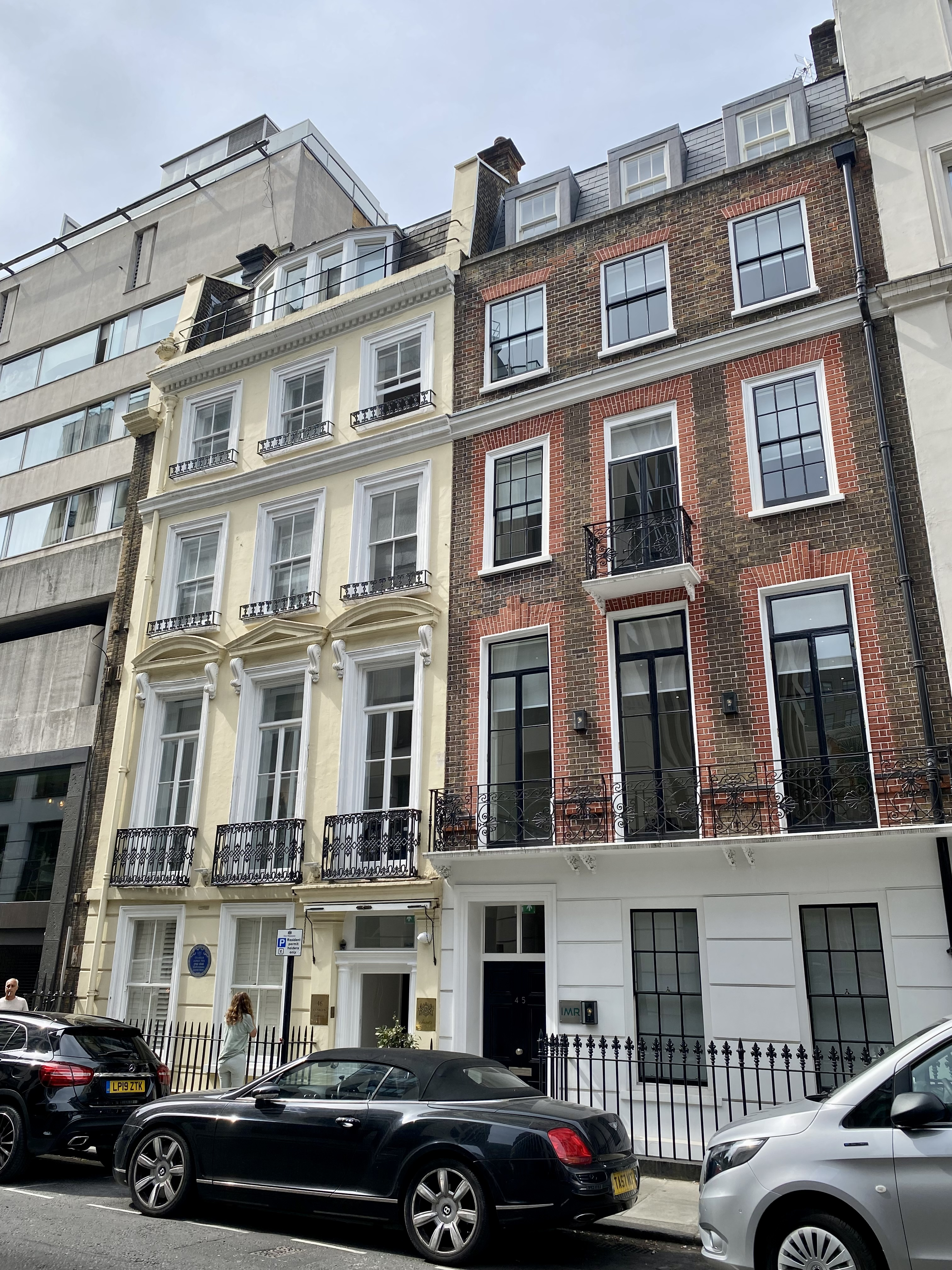
45 and 46 Clarges Street. 46 is currently occupied by the Fox Club

45 and 46 Clarges Street are two Grade II listed townhouses built around 1730–1750, located in Clarges Street in the Mayfair district of London.

== Architecture ==
The Historic England listing describes them as "Brown brick with stuccoed ground floors. 4 storeys and basements. Each 3 windows wide. Doorways to left and right respectively ... " Number 45 has "c. 1800 cast iron balcony to 1st floor and balconette to central 2nd floor window" and number 46 has "wrought iron balconette to 1st floor".

== Residents ==
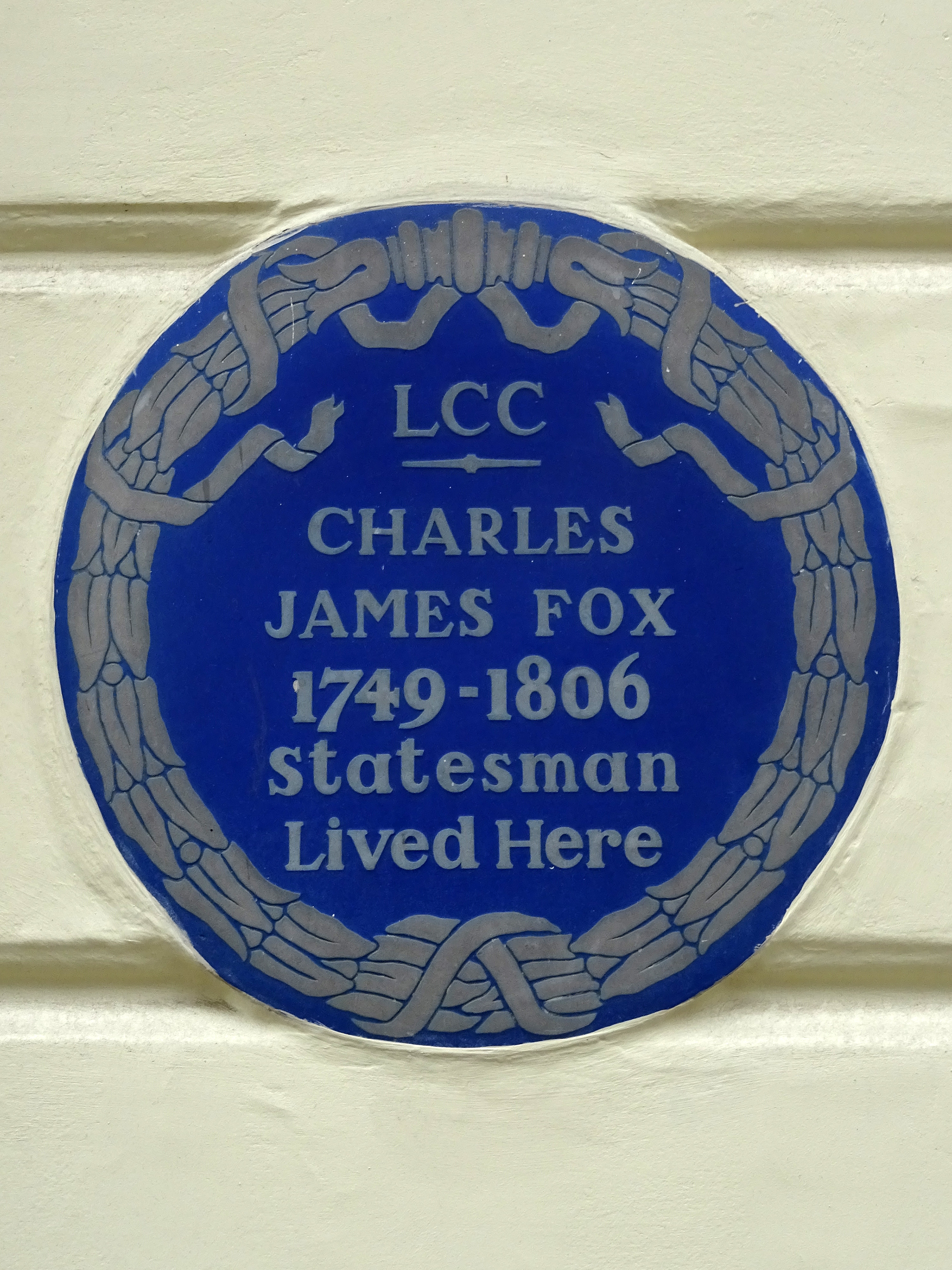
Charles James Fox (1749–1806) blue plaque

Mary Robinson moved to number 45 in 1788. A plaque noting the residence of Charles James Fox, a British whig, is at number 46, which is currently occupied by the Fox Club, a gentlemen's club. Stephen Dowell died at number 46 in 1898.
