= McDowell (surname) =

McDowell, also spelt MacDowell, is a Scottish surname. It is derived from the Gaelic Mac Dubhghaill, meaning "son of Dubhghall" (i.e. of the same origin as McDougall) from the dubh meaning black and gall meaning foreigner indicating a Viking ancestor from Denmark.

== People ==
=== McDowell ===
- Abram Irvin McDowell (1793–1844), mayor of Columbus, Ohio
- Alex McDowell (born 1955), British narrative designer
- Alexander McDowell (1845–1913), congressman from Pennsylvania
- Andrew McDowell (born 1971), Irish economist
- Anne Elizabeth McDowell (1826–1901), American newspaper editor
- Charles S. McDowell (1871–1943), interim governor of Alabama
- Charles T. McDowell (1921–2007), American academic and military officer
- Charlie McDowell (born 1983), American film director and writer
- Derek McDowell (born 1958), Irish politician
- Ephraim McDowell (1771–1830), American physician
- Erin Jeanne McDowell, American cookbook author
- Fred McDowell (1904–1972), American blues singer and guitar player
- Graeme McDowell (born 1979), Northern Irish professional golfer
- Hugh McDowell (1953–2018), English cellist, member of Electric Light Orchestra
- Irvin McDowell (1818–1885), Union army general
- Jack McDowell (born 1960), former Major League Baseball pitcher
- Jack McDowell (politician) (c. 1922)—2006, Northern Irish political activist
- James McDowell (1795–1851), politician from Virginia
- James F. McDowell (1825–1887), politician from Indiana
- James F. McDowell (Wisconsin politician) (1862–1938), politician from Wisconsin
- John McDowell (born 1942), South African philosopher
- Jonathan McDowell (born 1960), American and British astrophysicist
- Johnny McDowell (1915–1952), American Formula One driver
- Joseph "Pleasant Gardens" McDowell (1758–1795), American statesman from North Carolina
- Joseph McDowell Jr. (1756–1801), American statesman
- Joseph J. McDowell (1800–1877), U.S. Congressman from Ohio
- Joseph Nash McDowell (1805–1868), American doctor
- Josh McDowell (born 1939), American Christian apologist and author
- Kelly McDowell (born circa 1953), mayor of El Segundo, California
- Linda McDowell (born 1949), British geographer
- Louise Sherwood McDowell (1876–1966), American physicist
- Malik McDowell (born 1996), American football player
- Malcolm McDowell (born 1943), English actor
- Mark McDowell (born 1962), Canadian diplomat
- Marty McDowell (born 1987), New Zealand canoeist
- Mary Dagen McDowell (born 1969), American news anchor and analyst
- Matthew McDowell (1850–1944), Scottish Steamboat owner and builder
- Michael McDowell (actor) (born 1964), Northern Irish actor
- Michael McDowell (author) (1950–1999), American novelist and screenwriter
- Michael McDowell (politician) (born 1951), barrister and former Irish politician
- Michael McDowell (racing driver) (born 1984), American race car driver
- Michael P. Kube-McDowell (born 1954), American science fiction writer
- Miriama McDowell, New Zealand actress, director, and playwright.
- Oddibe McDowell (born 1962), former Major League Baseball
- Paul McDowell (rower) (1905–1962), American rower
- Paul McDowell (actor) (1931–2016), English actor and screenwriter
- Robert H. McDowell (1894–1980), American historian and intelligence officer
- Robert M. McDowell (born 1963), former U.S. Federal Communications Commissioner
- Roger McDowell (born 1960), Major League baseball player and coach
- R. B. McDowell (1913–2011), professor emeritus of History, Trinity College Dublin
- Sam McDowell (born 1942), Major League baseball pitcher
- Samuel McDowell (1735–1817), American soldier and politician, father of Dr. Ephraim McDowell
- Thomas McDowell (born 1977), convicted murderer
- Thomas Bleakley McDowell (1923–2009), British soldier
- William McDowell (musician) (born 1976), American gospel musician
- William Fraser McDowell (1858–1937), American Bishop of the Methodist Episcopal Church
- William Osborn McDowell (1848–1927), American businessman

=== MacDowell ===
- Andie MacDowell (born 1958), American film actress
- Charles H. MacDowell (1867–1954), American chemist
- Douglas MacDowell (1931–2010), British classical scholar
- Edward MacDowell (1860–1908), American composer
- Harold MacDowell, American construction company executive
- João MacDowell, Brazilian musician
- Louis G. MacDowell (died 1986), American USDA researcher
- Marian MacDowell (1857–1956), American pianist
- Patrick MacDowell (1799–1870), Irish sculptor
- Samuel Wallace MacDowell III (1846–1908), Brazilian military man, magistrate, politician and journalist
- Thain Wendell MacDowell (1890–1960), Canadian Victoria Cross recipient

=== Fictional ===
- Evangeline A.K. MacDowell, a fictional character from Negima! manga series
- Billy MacDowell, a fictional character in the Alice 19th manga
- William McDowell, a character in the TV show 1923

== See also ==
- McDowell Lee (1925–2014), American politician
- Curtis McDowald (born 1996), American fencer
- Mike MacDowel (born 1932), British racecar driver
- Clan Macdowall, a Scottish clan
- McDowell (disambiguation)
