= Gregory Douglass =

American singer-songwriter

- Born: December 19, 1980 (age 45)
- Origin: Burlington, Vermont, United States
- Genres: Folk rock, alternative rock
- Occupations: Singer-songwriter
- Instruments: Vocals, acoustic guitar, piano
- Years active: 1998–present
- Label: Emote Records
- Website: www.gregorydouglass.com

Gregory Douglass (born December 19, 1980) is an American singer-songwriter. Douglass plays lead guitar and piano.

== Background ==
Douglass was born and raised in rural Vermont, performing in musical theater and winning local talent shows in his early teens. He taught himself to play the piano and guitar by age 14, and began writing his own original songs throughout junior high. While attending Brewster Academy in Wolfeboro, New Hampshire, Douglass composed and recorded the material for his first two albums. On graduation day, the schools' Headmaster presented him with a music award and publicly announced that Douglass was the first student he would ever encourage not to go to college, advice that convinced him to immediately pursue music full-time. Douglass has also been involved in theatre work, both at the amateur and professional levels. His roles included "Hero" in A Funny Thing Happened on the Way to the Forum, alongside actor Topher Grace who played "Pseudolus", while attending Brewster Academy.

== Music ==
Douglass is an independent musician with eight and a multitude of digital singles and music videos.

Douglass has been compared to artists like Tori Amos, Jeff Buckley, Patty Griffin and Rufus Wainwright.

== Personal life ==
Douglass is openly gay, and some of his lyrics deal with queer themes.

== Discography ==
Studio Albums	EPs and Other Albums
If I Were A Man (1998); Gregory Douglass (2000); Teeter (2001); Pseudo-Rotary (2003); Stark (2005); Up & Away (2006); Battler (2009); Lucid (2011); My Hero, The Enemy (2016)	Retro Active : Volume 1 (2007); Retro Active : Volume 2 (2008); Naked (2005) – released as part of a Stark pre-order package; Peacekeeper (2009) – released as part of a Battler pre-order package; Merry (2009) – A holiday EP.
