= Shaun Kenny-Dowall =

New Zealand Māori and New Zealand international rugby league footballer

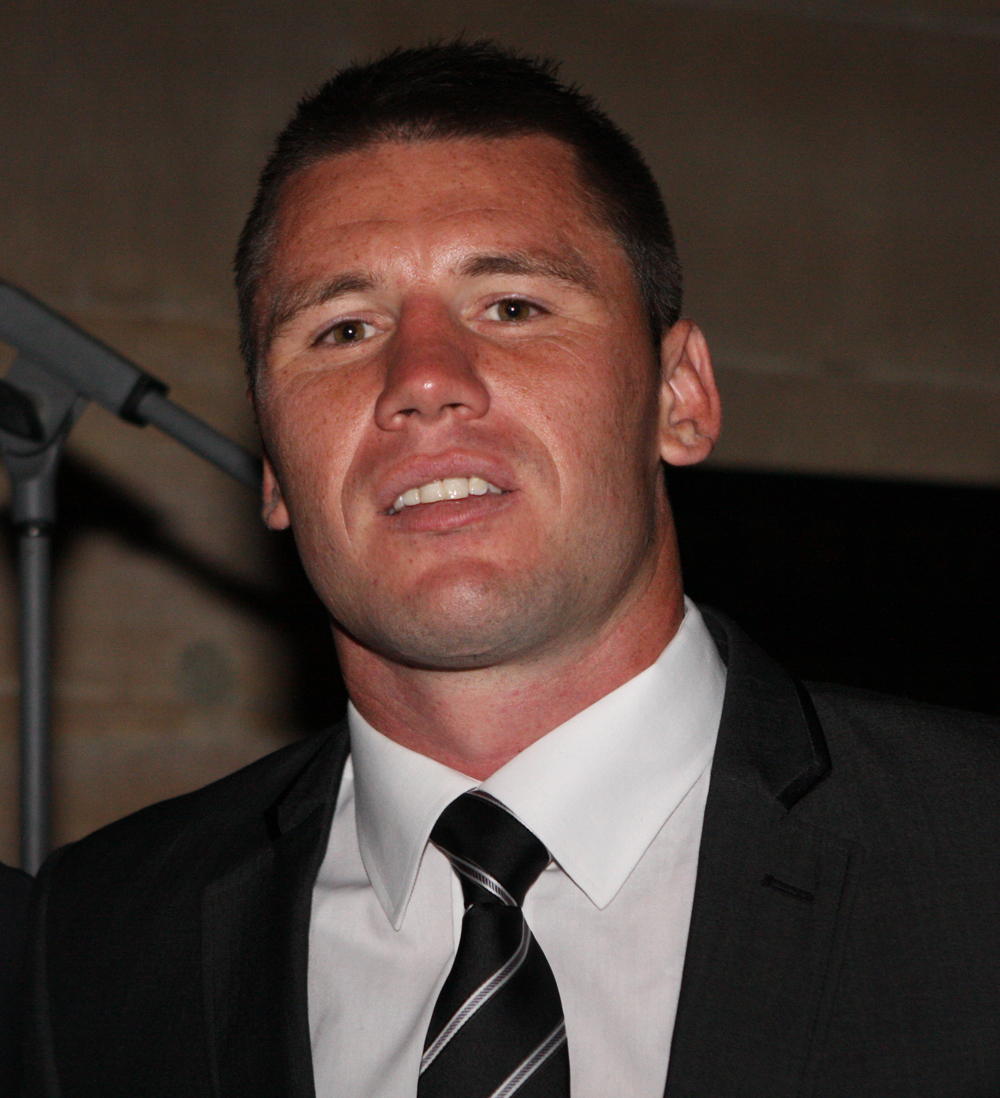

Personal information
- Born: 23 January 1988 (age 38) Brisbane, Queensland, Australia

Playing information
- Height: 6 ft 4 in (1.94 m)
- Weight: 16 st 5 lb (104 kg)
- Position: Centre, Wing
Club
| Years | Team | Pld | T | G | FG | P |
|---|---|---|---|---|---|---|
| 2007–17 | Sydney Roosters | 224 | 121 | 3 | 0 | 490 |
| 2017–19 | Newcastle Knights | 53 | 18 | 0 | 0 | 72 |
| 2020–23 | Hull Kingston Rovers | 93 | 25 | 0 | 0 | 100 |
| | Total | 370 | 164 | 3 | 0 | 662 |
Representative
| Years | Team | Pld | T | G | FG | P |
| 2007–16 | New Zealand | 21 | 9 | 0 | 0 | 36 |
| 2008 | New Zealand Māori | 1 | 1 | 0 | 0 | 4 |
| 2011–13 | NRL All Stars | 2 | 1 | 0 | 0 | 4 |
| 2022 | Combined Nations All Stars | 1 | 1 | 0 | 0 | 0 |
- Spouse: Georgina Greig
- Children: 1
- Father: John Dowall

Shaun Kenny-Dowall (born 23 January 1988) is a New Zealand international former rugby league footballer who last played as a centre and winger for Hull Kingston Rovers in the Super League. He was also the club captain.

He previously played for the Sydney Roosters, winning the 2013 NRL Grand Final with them and the Newcastle Knights in the NRL. He has played for the New Zealand Māori and NRL All Stars, and played in New Zealand's 2010 Four Nations-winning side as well as the 2014 Four Nations-winning side.

== Early years ==
Kenny-Dowall was born in Woodridge, Brisbane, Queensland, Australia. He is of English & Māori descent specifically the Ngāti Ākarana Iwi (tribe).

He moved to Auckland as a three-year-old and began his rugby league career playing for the East Coast Bays Barracudas on Auckland's North Shore. Kenny-Dowall later resided in Ngāruawāhia, where he attended Ngaruawahia High School and played for Turangawaewae and the Ngaruawahia Panthers. Kenny-Dowall was a New Zealand Warriors junior but was unwanted by the club before moving to Sydney in 2004. Kenny-Dowall was selected for the Junior Kiwis in 2006.

His father, John Dowall, won a gold medal in javelin and a silver medal in shot put at the 2000 Paralympic Games.

== Playing career ==
=== 2006 ===
Kenny-Dowall played in the 2006 NSW Cup grand final for Newtown who were the Sydney Roosters feeder club at the time against Parramatta. Newtown would lose the grand final 20-19 at Stadium Australia.

=== 2007 ===
Kenny-Dowall joined the Sydney Roosters and made his National Rugby League debut in round 1 the 2007 NRL season against the South Sydney Rabbitohs, playing on the wing in the Roosters' 6–18 loss. In round 4, against the Brisbane Broncos, Kenny-Dowall scored his first NRL try in the Roosters 10–32 loss at the SFS. In round 13, Kenny-Dowall scored a hat-trick in the Roosters 64–30 victory over the North Queensland Cowboys at the SFS. Kenny-Dowall finished his debut year in the NRL with playing in 14 matches and scored 8 tries in the 2007 NRL season. At the end of the season he was selected for the New Zealand All Golds to play against the Northern Union in October as part of the 2007 All Golds Tour. He missed out on selection for the New Zealand national rugby league team for the 2007 Baskerville Shield test series against the Great Britain Lions but was selected for the test against France due to the injury of Taniela Tuiaki, scoring a try on test debut in the 22–14 win.

=== 2008 ===
Kenny-Dowall played 19 matches and scored 15 tries for the Roosters in the 2008 NRL season. Kenny-Dowall was named in the New Zealand training squad for the 2008 World Cup but was not selected. Instead, Kenny-Dowall played for the New Zealand Māori which met the Indigenous Dreamtime team in a curtain-raiser to the World Cup, scoring a try in the 34–26 loss.

=== 2009 ===
Kenny-Dowall played in all 24 matches and scored 14 tries and kicked three goals in the Roosters' Wooden Spoon 2009 NRL season.

=== 2010 ===
In round 20, against the Brisbane Broncos, Kenny-Dowall scored 4 tries in the 34–30 win at Suncorp Stadium, becoming the first Rooster in 35 years to score 4 tries in a single match. In the Roosters qualifying final match, against the Wests Tigers at the SFS, Kenny-Dowall scored the winning try in golden point extra time by intercepting the ball and running 70 metres downfield to win the match for the Roosters 19–15. Kenny-Dowall played at centre in the Roosters 2010 NRL Grand Final 32–8 loss to the St George Illawarra Dragons. Kenny-Dowall played in all the Roosters 28 matches and scored 21 tries being the 2010 NRL season's highest tryscorer along with Newcastle's Akuila Uate. Kenny-Dowall cemented his position in the centres for the Kiwis in the 2010 Four Nations series, scoring three tries including one in the final. Kenny-Dowall combined with Benji Marshall, Jason Nightingale and Nathan Fien to set up the series winning 79th minute try. Kenny-Dowall's form throughout 2010 saw him runner up to Marshall in the Rugby League World Golden Boot Award, where he made centre in the team of the year.

=== 2011 ===
On 13 February 2011, Kenny-Dowall was chosen to play for the NRL All Stars team on the interchange bench, scoring a try in the 28–12 win over the Indigenous All Stars at Cbus Super Stadium. On 10 March 2011, Kenny-Dowall agreed to a 4-year deal with the Roosters worth $1.4m. Kenny-Dowall played for the New Zealand Kiwis at centre in the 2011 Anzac Test at Cbus Super Stadium against Australia in the 20–10 defeat. In round 19, against the South Sydney Rabbitohs, Kenny-Dowall played his 100th NRL career match for the Roosters, scoring a try in the 21–20 loss at ANZ Stadium. Kenny-Dowall played in 20 matches and scored 9 tries for the Roosters in the 2011 NRL season.

=== 2012 ===
Kenny-Dowall played in the Kiwis 2012 Anzac Test at centre in the 20–12 loss to Australia at Eden Park. Kenny-Dowall played in 17 matches and scored 8 tries for the Roosters in the 2012 NRL season.

=== 2013 ===
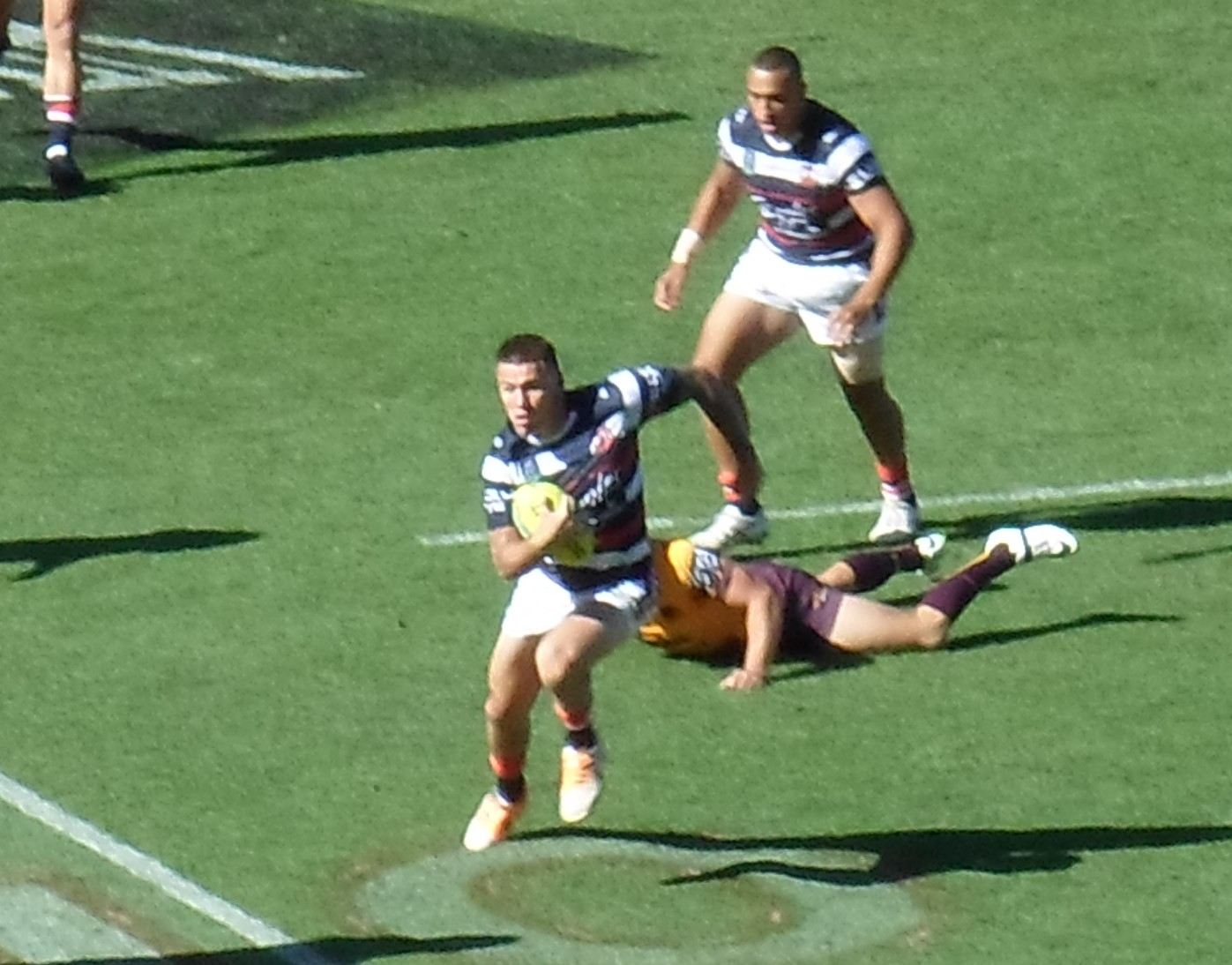
Shaun Kenny-Dowall with a run during the Roosters' inaugural Nines campaign

On 13 February 2013, Kenny-Dowall was chosen to play for the NRL All Stars team at centre in the 32–6 loss over the Indigenous All Stars at Suncorp Stadium. For the 2013 Anzac Test, Kenny-Dowall was selected to play for New Zealand at centre in their 32–12 loss to Australia at Canberra Stadium. Kenny-Dowall played in the Roosters 26–18 victory in the 2013 NRL Grand Final against the Manly-Warringah Sea Eagles. scoring a try in the 60th minute of the match. After the match it was revealed that he had broken a tooth and fractured his jaw in an early encounter in the match. The injury forced him to miss the 2013 Rugby League World Cup. Kenny-Dowall played in all the Roosters 27 matches and scored 9 tries.

=== 2014 ===
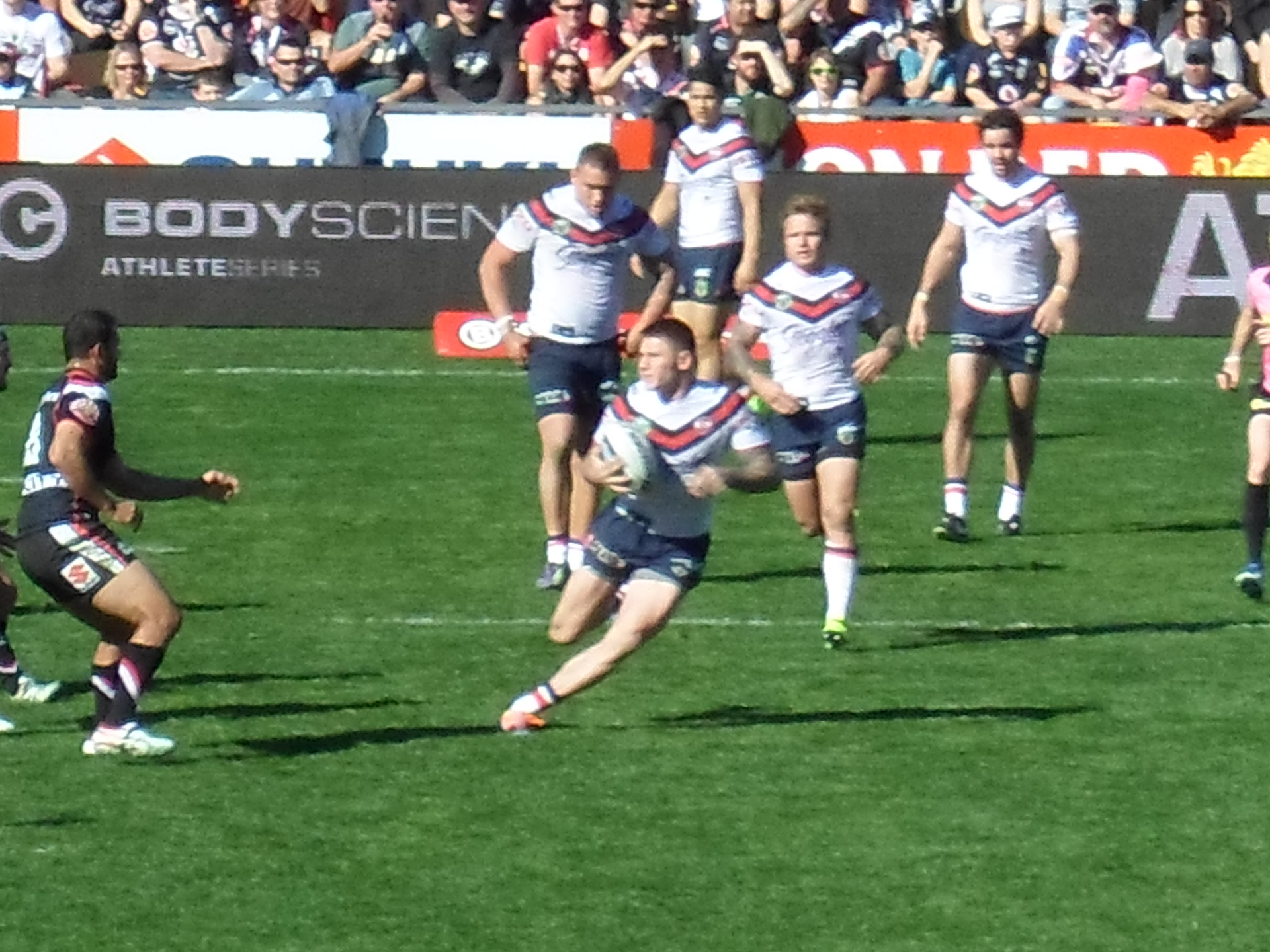
Kenny-Dowall with the ball against the Warriors in 2014

In the 2014 NRL season round 1 season opener, against the South Sydney Rabbitohs, Kenny-Dowall played his 150th career NRL match for the Roosters in the 28–8 loss at ANZ Stadium. Kenny-Dowall finished off the 2014 NRL season with him playing in all of the Roosters 27 matches and scoring 11 tries. On 7 October 2014, Kenny-Dowall was selected in the New Zealand Kiwis final 24-man squad for the 2014 Four Nations series. Kenny-Dowall played at centre in the Kiwis 22–18 Four Nations final win over Australia at Westpac Stadium.

=== 2015 ===
In round 8, against the St George Illawarra Dragons, Kenny-Dowall scored his 100th NRL career try in the Roosters 14–12 loss at the Sydney Football Stadium. On 3 May, Kenny-Dowall played for New Zealand against Australia in the 2015 Anzac Test, playing at centre and scoring a try in the Kiwis' 26–12 win at Suncorp Stadium. On 11 May 2015, Kenny-Dowall extended his contract with the Roosters for a further two years keeping him at the club until the end of the 2017 season. In round 15, against the St George Illawarra Dragons, Kenny-Dowall scored 2 tries in the match becoming the Roosters second highest tryscorer with 105 tries, overtaking Bill Mullins record of 104 tries during the Roosters 19–14 win at the Sydney Football Stadium. After missing nearly two months of the season due to off-field issues, Kenny-Dowall returned to the field in round 26 against the South Sydney Rabbitohs in the Roosters 30–0 win at the Sydney Football Stadium. In the preliminary final match, against the Brisbane Broncos, Kenny-Dowall made headlines after making one of the biggest blunders of the season when he attempted throw a pass from the wing to fullback Roger Tuivasa-Sheck under pressure. The pass was easily intercepted by Broncos fullback Darius Boyd and Boyd ran away to score the try in the first minute of the match in the Roosters 31–12 loss at Suncorp Stadium. Kenny-Dowall finished his highly publicised 2015 NRL season with him being the Roosters highest tryscorer for the season with 17 tries in 20 matches. On 8 October 2015, Kenny-Dowall was selected in the 23-man New Zealand squad for the 2015 Tour of Great Britain. Kenny-Dowall played in all three test matches against England on the wing and scored a try in the Kiwis 2-1 Baskerville Shield series loss.

=== 2016 ===
On 2 February 2016, Kenny-Dowall was named in the Roosters 2016 NRL Auckland Nines squad. On 29 February 2016, Kenny-Dowall was found not guilty to all of the domestic violence charges against his ex-girlfriend, Jessica Peris. In round 4, against the Manly-Warringah Sea Eagles, Kenny-Dowall played his 200th NRL career match and scored 2 tries in the Roosters 22–20 loss at the Sydney Football Stadium. On 1 May 2016, Kenny-Dowall was named in the New Zealand Kiwis 19-man squad for the 2016 ANZAC Test but was later ruled out of the match due to a foot injury. Kenny-Dowall finished the 2016 NRL season with him playing in 19 matches and scoring 7 tries for the Roosters. On 6 September 2016, Kenny-Dowall was added to the New Zealand national rugby league team train-on squad for the 2016 Four Nations.

=== 2017 ===
On 5 May, Kenny-Dowall was charged with possessing a prohibited drug after he was found with half a gram of cocaine at a Sydney nightclub. On 12 June, he had his Roosters contract terminated. On 27 June, after escaping conviction for the charges, it was announced that he was able to join the Newcastle Knights effective immediately on a contract until the end of 2019. He finished his season with Roosters having played in 9 matches and scoring 2 tries.

At the time he was released, he was the sixth highest capped Rooster in their 110-year history as well as their second highest try-scorer with 122. Kenny-Dowall also kicked three goals, all in 2009, for the tri-colours.

Kenny-Dowall made his Knights debut against the Roosters in round 20 of the 2017 season, scoring the Knights' only try in their 4–28 loss.

=== 2018 ===
In round 9 of the 2018 season, Kenny-Dowall scored 2 tries in the Knights' 12–34 loss to the South Sydney Rabbitohs, at McDonald Jones Stadium.

=== 2019 ===
In September, it was revealed that 2019 would be Kenny-Dowall's last year in the NRL. On Thursday 19 September, it was announced that he would be joining Super League side Hull Kingston Rovers on a 2-year contract starting from 2020. He finished his time with the Knights having played in 53 matches and scoring 18 tries.

=== 2020 ===
Kenny-Dowall made 19 appearances for Hull KR and scored 4 tries in the 2020 Super League season. Hull KR finished bottom of the table but avoided relegation due to the interrupted season which was caused by the COVID-19 pandemic.

=== 2021 ===
In round 18 of the 2021 Super League season, he scored two tries for Hull KR in a 34-28 victory over Leigh. Kenny-Dowall played every game for Hull KR in the 2021 Super League season as the club reached the semi-final stage of the competition before losing 28-10 against the Catalans Dragons.

=== 2022 ===
Kenny-Dowall made 23 appearances for Hull KR in the 2022 Super League season scoring four tries. Kenny-Dowall was later named in the 2022 Super League dream team at centre.

=== 2023 ===
On 7 March, Kenny-Dowall was given a four-game ban including a £750 fine for making unnecessary contact with an injured opponent during Hull Kingston Rovers loss against Leigh in round 3 of the 2023 Super League competition. On 24 May, Kenny-Dowall announced he would be retiring at the end of the 2023 season. On 12 August, Kenny-Dowall played for Hull Kingston Rovers in their 17-16 golden point extra-time loss to Leigh in the Challenge Cup final. Kenny-Dowall's final game as a player was their 42-12 semi-final loss against Wigan which saw Hull Kingston Rovers finish just one game away from the grand final.

== Controversies ==
On 18 July 2015, Kenny-Dowall was charged with ten domestic violence offences over the alleged abuse of his former de facto partner, Jessica Peris, daughter of ex-Olympian-turned politician Nova Peris. A police statement said the incidents were believed to have taken place between October 2014 and June 2015. Peris filed for an Apprehended Violence Order against Kenny-Dowall two days before he was charged. Kenny-Dowall pleaded not guilty to the charges at a hearing in August 2015.

Kenny-Dowall's trial commenced on 24 February 2016 in Sydney. On 29 February, magistrate Gregory Grogin found him not guilty on all 11 charges, taking into account lack of evidence, witness credibility issues, and his good character.

On 5 May 2017, Kenny-Dowall was charged with possessing a prohibited drug after he was found with half a gram of cocaine at a Sydney nightclub. He pled guilty and was placed on a one-year good behaviour bond. It was found in court that Kenny-Dowall had taken a hair follicle drug test which returned a negative result.
