= Day Hort MacDowall (British Army officer) =

British Army general (1795–1870)

Lieutenant-General Day Hort MacDowall DL
- Born: 3 July 1795
- Died: 14 September 1870 (aged 75)
- Military career
- Allegiance: United Kingdom
- Branch: British Army
- Rank: Lieutenant-General

Lieutenant-General Day Hort MacDowall DL (3 July 1795 – 14 September 1870) was a British Army officer who served as colonel of the 3rd (the East Kent) Regiment of Foot.

== Military career ==
MacDowall was commissioned as an ensign on 15 April 1813 and then served as a major in the 44th Regiment of Foot. He became colonel of the 3rd (the East Kent) Regiment of Foot and was promoted to lieutenant-general in 1866. As the 22nd MacDowall of Garthland, MacDowall was also a Scottish laird.
