= Erin Kamler =

American writer, composer, and academic researcher

- Born: February 13, 1975 (age 51); Ann Arbor, Michigan, U.S.
- Education: Sarah Lawrence College (BA); USC Annenberg School for Communication and Journalism (MA, PhD); USC School of International Relations (MA)
- Occupations: Writer, composer, academic researcher
- Awards: Los Angeles Ovation Award (2009); Backstage Garland Award (2010); Frederick Loewe Award (2008); Hopwood Award (1994)
- Website: kamlerproductions.com

Erin Kamler (born February 13, 1975) is an American writer, composer, and academic researcher whose cross-disciplinary work includes musical theater, recording, and feminist scholarship.

A native of Ann Arbor, Michigan, Kamler has a PhD from USC's Annenberg School for Communication and Journalism, a master's in Public Diplomacy from the USC School of International Relations, a master's in communication arts from USC Annenberg, and a bachelor's in music composition from Sarah Lawrence College. Conversationally fluent in Thai, her doctoral research focused on the trafficking and migration of women in Thailand and Burma.

As a playwright and composer, Kamler is a winner of the Los Angeles Ovation Award, Backstage Garland Awards, a three-time winner of Stephen Sondheim's Young Playwrights Festival Award and the University of Michigan Hopwood Award. Her musicals have been staged at New Dramatists, Berkeley Repertory Theatre, The Public Theater, Playwrights Horizons, and the Edinburgh Festival Fringe. She is a member of the Dramatists Guild of America.

== Career ==
=== Playwright and Composer ===
Kamler began writing and composing musicals as a child in Ann Arbor, Michigan, producing over fifteen full-length works by age eighteen. Her early plays were staged at The Public Theater and Playwrights Horizons in New York. She won Stephen Sondheim's Young Playwright's Festival three times (1991, 1992, 1994) and received the University of Michigan Hopwood Award for playwriting in 1994.

Her musical Runway 69 — a work about a strip club on the eve of the Times Square clean-up, co-written with Carson Kreitzer — was developed at New Dramatists, where it won the 2008 Frederick Loewe Award.

=== Divorce! The Musical (2009) ===
Divorce! The Musical made its world premiere at the Hudson Mainstage Theatre in Hollywood on February 14, 2009, with book, music, and lyrics by Kamler. The production was covered by Playbill both in advance and at opening, and ran for more than five months, receiving three extensions.

The Los Angeles production won six theatrical awards, including the 2009 Los Angeles Ovation Award for Best Book, Music, and Lyrics for an Original Musical — competing against the Broadway productions 9 to 5 and Minsky's. It also won the 2010 Backstage Garland Award for Best Playwriting and the 2010 Backstage Garland Award for Best Musical Score. The show was featured on NPR's All Things Considered, Entertainment Tonight, and received the Los Angeles Times Critic's Choice.

=== Land of Smiles (2013-2014) ===
Land of Smiles is a musical with book, music, and lyrics by Kamler, based on her doctoral fieldwork looking at human trafficking in Thailand. The show was first workshopped at the Gate Theater in Chiang Mai, Thailand in 2013 and subsequently produced at the Edinburgh Festival Fringe in 2014, where it garnered critical acclaim.

Musical Theatre Review praised the production's "intelligent book and score" and described it as "a moving show that lives with you long after the final note has been played." The Scotsman called it "nothing short of remarkable" in tackling the subject in musical form. The Irrawaddy described the musical as "a beautifully composed and highly creative rebuttal to the widely held assumptions that underpin anti-trafficking policies." Prior to Edinburgh, the show ran at the Los Angeles Theatre Center, and was previewed by LA Downtown News.

Chiang Mai CityLife published an extended interview with Kamler about the show's development, describing its premiere as a "groundbreaking production" and detailing the way Kamler's fieldwork interviewing migrant sex workers and NGO employees formed the foundation of the script.

== Academic Research ==
Kamler's scholarship focuses on feminist research, communication, and using arts-based methods in international development practice and human rights advocacy. She has conducted fieldwork with anti-trafficking NGOs, female migrant laborers, trafficking survivors, community-based women's organizations, and U.S. and Thai government actors across Southeast and East Asia.

=== Rewriting the Victim (Oxford University Press, 2019) ===
Kamler's book Rewriting the Victim: Dramatization as Research in Thailand's Anti-Trafficking Movement was published by Oxford University Press in 2019, as part of the Oxford Studies in Gender and International Relations series. The book introduces Kamler's concept of Dramatization as Research (DAR) — a methodology blending arts-based practice with feminist theory, and applied through the research, writing, and production of Land of Smiles.

The book received endorsements from Heather Barr of Human Rights Watch's Women's Rights Division, who described it as "an invaluable antidote to the paternalism and moralizing behind too many anti-trafficking efforts." Duncan McCargo of Columbia University called it "a compelling piece of research that shares the stage with an extraordinary theatrical performance, breaking down the barriers between academia, development practice, and the arts."

A peer review in Feminist Encounters: A Journal of Critical Studies in Culture and Politics (2020) characterized the book as "brilliantly deconstructing the chimerical binaries that engulf trafficking discourse" while urging policymakers to move toward holistic, evidence-based solutions.

=== Academic Positions ===
Between 2014 and 2025, Kamler served as Affiliated Researcher at Chiang Mai University and as Director, Partner Programs, Asia at Minerva Project, as well as Visiting Professor of Arts and Humanities at Minerva University. She was also a recipient of the USC Graduate Research Enhancement Fellowship.

== Music ==
As a singer, songwriter, and recording artist, Kamler has released multiple albums and performed internationally in India, Japan, Mexico, Italy, Turkey, Thailand, and throughout the United States.

=== Refuge (2025) ===
Refuge (2025) is Kamler's most recent album, bringing together Buddhist and Jewish mantras with original songs of love and grief, inspired by her years living in Thailand during the COVID-19 pandemic. The 12-track album features piano and vocal performances by Kamler, alongside Nepali folk musicians from the ensemble Kutumba, Thai percussionists, and New York string players. String arrangements are by orchestrator David Shenton.

BroadwayWorld described it as "a true global endeavor," noting that it was recorded between Chiang Mai, Kathmandu, Los Angeles, and New York. Religion News Service published a feature interview with Kamler about the album's origin and themes, situating it within her long-running research on gender equality in Southeast Asia and describing how the Myanmar coup directly shaped its contents. Imprint Entertainment covered the album's release, describing Kamler as a composer, human rights activist, and academic researcher.

=== Earlier Releases ===
Kamler's earlier work was released under the name Mantra Girl, including Mantra Girl: Truth (2005) — which Billboard described as "as calming as it is energizing," and featuring instrumentation from members of the New York Philharmonic — and Mantra Girl: Trinity (2007), as well as Kundalini Yoga Instructional DVDs (2003).

== Awards and Recognition ==
- 2009 Los Angeles Ovation Award for Best Book, Music, and Lyrics for an Original Musical (Divorce! The Musical)
- 2010 Backstage Garland Award for Best Playwriting (Divorce! The Musical)
- 2010 Backstage Garland Award for Best Musical Score (Divorce! The Musical)
- 2008 Frederick Loewe Award, presented by New Dramatists (Runway 69)
- Stephen Sondheim's Young Playwright's Festival Award (1991, 1992, 1994)
- University of Michigan Hopwood Award for Playwriting (1994)
- 2013 USC Graduate Research Enhancement Fellowship
- 2009 LA Drama Critics Circle Award nomination for Best Original Score (Divorce! The Musical)

== Selected Works ==
=== Theatrical Works ===
- Runway 69 — book, music, and lyrics by Erin Kamler; co-written with Carson Kreitzer; winner of the 2008 Frederick Loewe Award (New Dramatists)
- Divorce! The Musical — book, music, and lyrics by Erin Kamler (world premiere 2009, Hudson Mainstage Theatre, Los Angeles)
- Land of Smiles — book, music, and lyrics by Erin Kamler (Chiang Mai, 2013; Edinburgh Fringe Festival, 2014)
- The Monsoon Trilogy — a series of musicals about women's rights in Southeast Asia (in development)

=== Discography ===
- The Street Is Not a Woman (1999)
- Mantra Girl: Truth (2005)
- Mantra Girl: Trinity (2007)
- Refuge (2025)

=== Academic Publications ===
==== Books ====
- Kamler, Erin M. (2019). Rewriting the Victim: Dramatization as Research in Thailand's Anti-Trafficking Movement. New York: Oxford University Press.

==== Journal Articles and Book Chapters ====
- Kamler, E., Jirattikorn, A., Sutsassanamarlee, D., and Sincharoen, K. (2025). "Gender, affective labor and the family-run business in Thailand during the Covid-19 pandemic." International Journal of Gender and Entrepreneurship.
- Krause, J., and Kamler, E. (2022). "Ceasefires and civilian protection monitoring in Myanmar." Global Studies Quarterly, 2(1), ksac005.
- Kamler, Erin M. (2016). "Performing Land of Smiles: Dramatization as research in Thailand's antitrafficking movement." International Journal of Communication 10: 3666-3688.
- Kamler, Erin M. (2015). "Women of the Kachin conflict: Trafficking and militarized femininity on the Burma-China border." Journal of Human Trafficking, 1:3, 209-234.
- Kamler, Erin. (2014). "Trafficking and Coerced Prostitution in Thailand: Re-Conceptualizing International Law in the Age of Globalization." In Liamputtong, P. (ed.), Contemporary Socio-Cultural and Political Perspectives in Thailand. Springer.
- Kamler, Erin Michelle. (2013). "Toward a methodology of arts-based participatory action research: Evaluating a theatre of the oppressed classroom site." New Scholar, 2(1), 107-120.
- Kamler, Erin Michelle. (2013). "Negotiating narratives of human trafficking: NGOs, communication and the power of culture." Journal of Intercultural Communication Research, 42(1), 73-90.
- Kamler, Erin. (2012). "Anti-Trafficking Responses to Thailand's Tier 2 Watch List Status: Seeing Policy Through Women's Eyes" (policy report).
- "NGO narratives in the global public sphere." (2011). The International Journal of Diversity in Organizations, Communities and Nations. Illinois: Common Ground.
- "Thai nationalism and the crisis of the colonised self." (2010). The South and Southeast Asia Culture and Religion Journal, Vol. IV, pp. 98–112.
- "National identity, the Shan, and child trafficking in northern Thailand: The case of D.E.P.D.C." (2010). In Shan and Beyond. Bangkok: Institute of Asian Studies, Chulalongkorn University.
