= Erin D. Michos =

American cardiologist and researcher

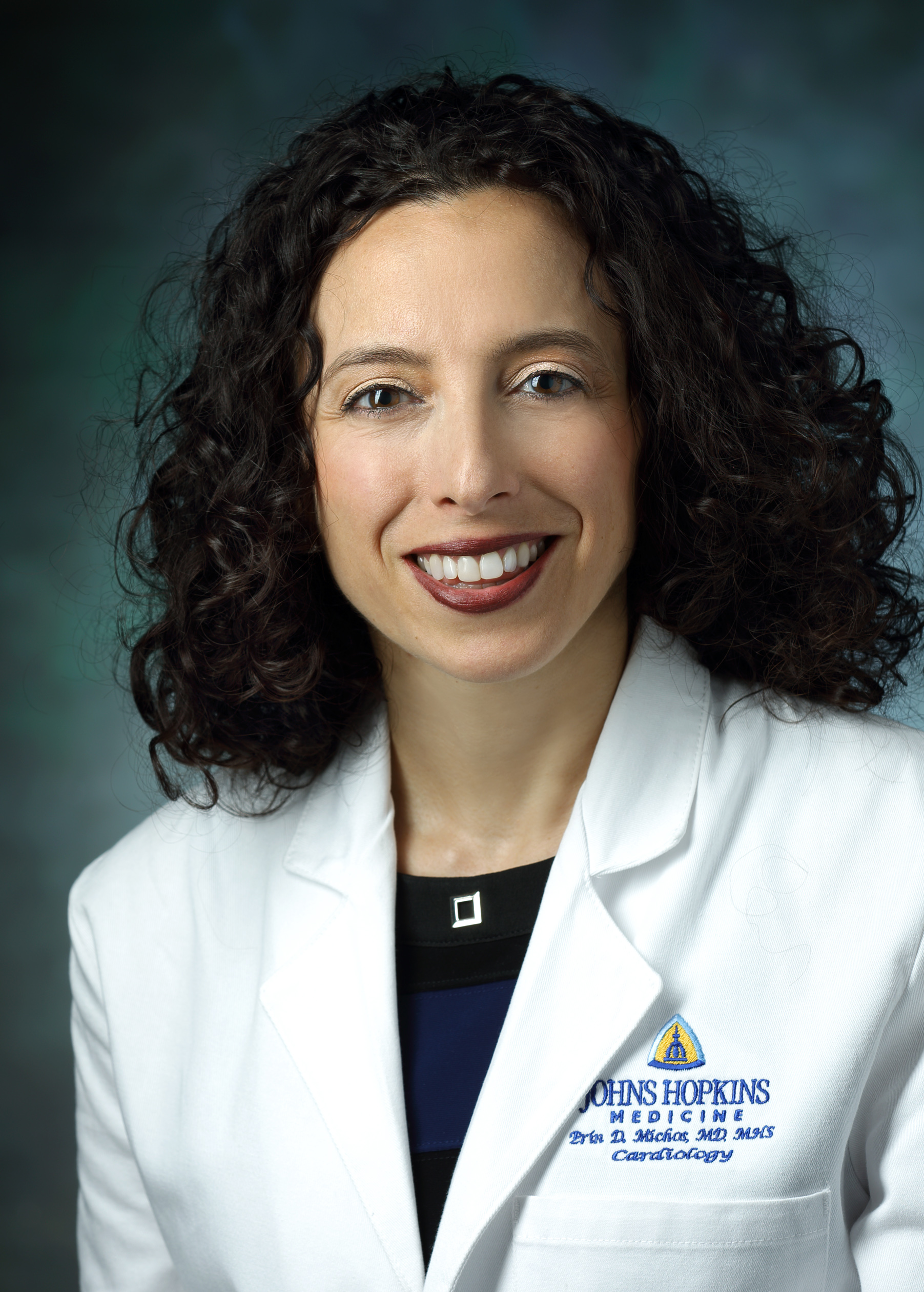

Academic background
- Education: B.Sc, Molecular Biology, 1996, MD. 2000, Northwestern University; MHS., Cardiovascular Epidemiology, 2007, Johns Hopkins Bloomberg School of Public Health

Academic work
- Institutions: Johns Hopkins School of Medicine
- Main interests: Preventive Cardiology
- Website: drerinmichos.com

Erin Kathleen Donnelly Michos is an American cardiologist. She is an associate professor of Medicine and Director of Women's Cardiovascular Health at Johns Hopkins School of Medicine. Michos is also an Associate Faculty of the Welch Center for Prevention, Epidemiology and Clinical Research at Johns Hopkins, and has a joint faculty appointment in the Department of Epidemiology at the Johns Hopkins Bloomberg School of Public Health.

Michos is an honorary fellow for the American Heart Association (FAHA), the American College of Cardiology (FACC), the American Society of Echocardiography (FASE), and the American Society for Preventive Cardiology (ASPC). During her tenure at Johns Hopkins, Michos has authored or co-authored over 300 manuscripts or book chapters published in peer-reviewed journals/textbooks.

== Personal life and education ==
Michos earned her medical degree from Northwestern University and her Master's in public health (MHS) from Johns Hopkins Bloomberg School of Public Health. After earning her MHS, Michos became a clinical fellow at Johns Hopkins, where she co-authored an editorial with Dr. Roger S. Blumenthal titled Further improvements in CHD risk prediction for women. The editorial was published in the Journal of the American Medical Association and argued for improvements to be made to the criteria in assessing postmenopausal women's chances of developing cardiovascular diseases.

Michos is half Italian and married to a Greek husband. She competes in marathons during her time off.

== Career ==
Michos joined the faculty at Johns Hopkins School of Medicine in 2007 as an instructor in their Division of Cardiology. She was promoted to assistant professor the following year. On July 1, 2008, Michos received the Clinician Scientist Award, which granted her $40,000, and American College of Cardiology Foundation/Pfizer Career Development Award, which granted her $65,000 over three years. In 2011, she was awarded a $1 million grant over four years from the National Institutes of Health National Institute of Neurologic Disorders and Stroke (NINDS) to evaluate the association of vitamin D with brain health outcomes. By May 2014, Michos was promoted to Associate professor.

Michos has participated in multiple national and international society guidelines and position statements including the 2019 American College of Cardiology (ACC)/American Heart Association (AHA) guideline to update recommendations for the primary prevention of cardiovascular disease. She has also been a co-author on a 2017 AHA Scientific Statement on Meditation and Cardiovascular Risk Reduction, and the 2017 American Diabetes Association (ADA) position statement on Hypertension management.

Michos has been chosen to sit on the American College of Cardiology (ACC) Prevention Leadership Council and the board of directors for the American Society of Preventive Cardiology (ASPC). She also became an associate editor on the journal Circulation and for the American Journal of Preventive Cardiology (AJPC). She is an honorary fellow for the American Heart Association (FAHA), the American College of Cardiology (FACC), the American Society of Echocardiography (FASE), and the American Society of Preventive Cardiology (FASPC).

=== Research ===
As an assistant professor, Michos was a co-lead investigator on a study published in the Archives of Internal Medicine which found that inadequate levels of vitamin D could lead to a 26 percent increased risk of death. Michos and her colleagues came to this conclusion by analyzing data from the Third National Health and Nutrition Examination Survey and people's vitamin D levels at the time of death. She also completed another study in November where she studied if there was a correlation between changes in coronary artery calcium and levels of sex hormones. The study concluded that men who produced natural sex hormones ran a higher risk of developing atherosclerosis or hardening of the arteries. It also found that older women who produced high levels of estrogen were more likely to develop coronary artery calcium. In 2009, Michos and Blumenthal used data collected from the JUPITER trial to research how many United States patients with low-cholesterol and high-C-reactive protein would benefit from digesting statin. They gathered data generated by the National Health and Nutrition Examination Survey from 1971 to 2009 of patients who fit the JUPITER trial requirements and concluded that 6.5 million older adults would benefit. The following year, Michos introduced data collected from a 14-year study of over 8,000 white and black adults which concluded that unlike for white people, low vitamin D was not the cause for the higher rate of strokes amongst black adults.

Upon earning a promotion to associate professor, Michos published in the Journal of American Heart Association (JAHA) an observational study that linked the use of calcium supplements (but not calcium in diet) with increased risk of developing calcification in the coronary (heart) arteries. This was followed up in 2018 when her team evaluated data from 18 studies involving over 2 million participants and found that no evidence for any cardiovascular benefit from multivitamin use. By 2019, her team led a study testing the legitimacy and quality of supplements aimed at improving heart health or lengthening life. Using data collected from 277 clinical trials, she concluded that the most effective supplements with possible health benefits only derived from a low-salt diet, omega-3 fatty acid supplements, and possibly folic acid supplements. It also found that supplements combining calcium and vitamin D could lead to an increased risk of stroke.

Michos simultaneously conducted studies for the betterment of women's cardiovascular health by examining how sex hormones can influence cardiovascular risk in women. In 2018, she and her research team published in the Journal of the American College of Cardiology (JACC) their findings that women after menopause who have higher testosterone levels are at increased risk for cardiovascular events such as heart attacks, strokes, and heart failure, even after taking into account lifestyle factors and other cardiovascular disease risk factors. She also completed another study in 2019 where she studied if there was a correlation between changes in coronary artery calcium and levels of sex hormones. The study concluded that older women who produced higher levels of testosterone were more likely to develop coronary artery calcium, a marker of atherosclerosis. Additionally, her team examined national survey data and found that women with cardiovascular disease were more likely to report that they had poor experiences with their healthcare compared to similar men. In this study, women patients were more likely to report they had poor communication with their doctors and that they felt their doctors did not respect or listen to them, compared to men. Furthermore, pharmacy data confirmed that women were also sub-optimally treated for their cardiovascular disease and were under-prescribed established preventive medications.

In July 2019, Michos co-authored a study testing the legitimacy and quality of supplements aimed at improving heart health or lengthening life. Using data collected from 277 clinical trials, she concluded that the most effective supplements with possible health benefits only derived from a low-salt diet, omega-3 fatty acid supplements, and possibly folic acid supplements. It also found that supplements combining calcium and vitamin D could lead to an increased risk of stroke. She also found that women with a history of multiple live births (five or more) were less likely to be in ideal cardiovascular health once they reach middle or older ages. In another study, which was published in JAMA Network Open, she found that more than half of women with cardiovascular disease do not meet recommended physical activity goals and that was associated with increased health care expenditure.

In 2020, Michos helped develop the Kardashian Index as a way to measure the discrepancy between a cardiologist's social media profile and publication record. She also published a study in the journal Circulation that examined the enrollment of women physicians in cardiology training programs for the past decade and found there has been a stagnation of progress, with only 21% of cardiology fellowship trainees being women which improved very little across the past decade. In this paper, she describes opportunities to improve recruitment of women into the field of cardiology through mentorship and sponsorship activities.
