= Moyra McDill =

Canadian mechanical engineer

Jennifer Moyra Jeane McDill is a Canadian mechanical engineer and a professor emerita in the Department of Mechanical and Aerospace Engineering at Carleton University. Her research has involved thermomechanical analysis using the finite element method, with applications including welding and robotics.

== Education and career ==
McDill is originally from South Ottawa, one of four children of a science teacher and a military mechanical engineer. Her favorite childhood toy was a construction excavator. She was a student at Merivale High School in Ottawa, and has a bachelor's degree, master's degree, and Ph.D. from Carleton University. Between the master's degree and the doctorate, she worked in eastern and central Canada as an engineering analyst; after the doctorate, she continued at Carleton as a faculty member. At Carleton, she was the first woman to earn a doctorate in mechanical engineering, the first woman on the mechanical engineering faculty, and the first woman to become a full professor of mechanical engineering.

She served as a commissioner of the Canadian Nuclear Safety Commission from 2002 to 2015, and as Doktorandombud (ombudsperson for the doctoral students) at the Chalmers University of Technology in Sweden from 2015 to 2022.

== Recognition ==
McDill is a Fellow of the Canadian Academy of Engineering.

She was a 2009 recipient of the Engineering Medal of the Ontario Society of Professional Engineers.

== Personal life ==
McDill was married to Alan Sinclair Oddy, a mechanical engineer and one of McDill's research collaborators, whom she met as a laboratory partner in her first year at Carleton; they had three children. He died in 2001, at age 44, of brain cancer. McDill published a memoir of her experiences with her husband's cancer, When Cancer Entered Our Family: How We Lived, Laughed, Cried and Survived (Novalis Publishing, 2007).

In 2011 she remarried a widowed Swedish professor and moved to Sweden.
