= Stephen Dowell =

English historian and legal writer

Stephen Dowell (1 May 1833 – 28 March 1898) was an English historian and legal writer, best known for his history of taxation in England.

== Biography ==
Dowell was born on 1 May 1833, in Shorwell on the Isle of Wight, to Stephen Wilkinson Dowell and Julia (née Beasley), daughter of Thomas Beasley of Seafield, County Dublin. Stephen Wilkinson was born in 1802. He served as the rector of Mottistone and Shorwell, and—from 1848 to his death in 1870—vicar of Gosfield, Essex.

Dowell was educated at Cheltenham College, which he entered upon its opening in 1841. He received further education in Sherborne and Highgate schools, afterwards attending Corpus Christi College, Oxford, which he matriculated into on 7 June 1851. Dowell graduated BA in 1855, proceeding to MA in 1872. The same year he received his BA, he was article to the London solicitor R. Bray.

He played first-class cricket for the Marylebone Cricket Club against Sussex at Lewes in 1860.

On 1 May 1862, Dowell was admitted student of Lincoln's Inn. He was also appointed an assistant solicitor to the Board of Inland Revenue by Lord Palmerston in that year. Dowell retired from this position due to poor health in August 1896. He died of pneumonia on 28 March 1898, aged 65, at his residence on 46 Clarges Street, London. Dowell was unmarried as of his death, and his will was probated at £10,314 11s. 5d.

== Work ==
Dowell was the author of several legal and historical essays. One such tract, The Income Tax Laws (1874) went through nine editions. The first edition was entitled The Income Tax Laws at Present in Force in the United Kingdom; later editions were entitled The Acts Relating to the Income Tax. His 365-page book A Sketch of the History of Taxes in England (1876), preempted his later work on the history of taxation. Dowell also compiled a three-volume anthology of personal selections from several writers' work, entitled Thoughts and Words (3 vols. 1891–98) and printed privately.

Dowell's principal historical work was his History of Taxation and Taxes in England from the Earliest Times to the Present Day (1884), printed in four volumes. According to Dowell, this multi-volume division was made as the "multiplicity of the taxes imposed in this country in the last century is such as to render it unpractical to combine in a single narrative the details of taxes with the general theory of taxation." The first two volumes follow the general development of taxation in England from the Middle Ages to 1885. The last two volumes follow each tax individually, how they evolved and were (in some cases) terminated with the progression of English history.

Dowell made additions for a second edition, published in 1888; it was next reprinted in 1965. The short biography of Dowell in the 1901 supplement to the Dictionary of National Biography referred to the History as the "standard work on the subject" at the time. The publishers of the 1965 reprint referred to Dowell's work a "classic and unique study", which "remains a major source book on early English taxation". Patrick Polden, in his biographical sketch of Dowell for the Oxford Dictionary of National Biography (2004) describes the work as a "valuable contribution to historical knowledge", which remained valuable in the late 20th century for its "compendious account of more recent centuries", even if its "coverage of remoter periods is sketchy and outdated". The 1965 reprinting was supplemented with a two-volume companion work by A. R. Ilersic, which studied the history of taxation from 1885 until the re-publication.
