= Érin grá mo chroí =

Irish folk song

"Érin grá mo chroí" ("Ireland, love of my heart", Roud 14056) is an Irish folksong that tells of emigration from Ireland.
