= Erin Hunter (soccer) =

Australian former soccer player (born 1982)

Personal information
- Date of birth: 28 October 1982 (age 44)
- Place of birth: Woolongong, New South Wales, Australia
- Position: Goalkeeper

Senior career*
Years	Team	Apps	(Gls)
2001	Club Marconi (women)		
2002–2003	NNSW Pride	9	(0)
- * Club domestic league appearances and goals

Erin Hunter (born Woolongong, 28 October 1982) is an Australian former soccer player, who was a goalkeeper for Northern New South Wales Pride (NNSW Pride) in the Women's National Soccer League (WNSL) from 2002. Hunter won the WNSL Rising Star award for best young player of the year for that debut season.

== Early years ==
Hunter was born in Woolongong on 28 October 1982 and attended Corrimal High School. In May 2000 she captained the South Coast soccer team, which won the New South Wales (NSW) Combined High Schools state finals. She was selected as keeper for the NSW All-Schools girls soccer team in the national finals in August of that year.

== Soccer career ==
By 2001 Hunter was appearing for Club Marconi (women)'s seniors team in the state second-tier league, Football NSW League One Women's. Hunter made her senior debut as goalkeeper for Northern New South Wales Pride (NNSW Pride) in the Women's National Soccer League (WNSL) on 12 October 2002, after being substituted at the 14th minute, in their 4–0 loss against previous year's champions, Canberra Eclipse. She appeared nine times for the Pride in her debut season. Hunter won the WNSL Rising Star award for best young player of the year for that season.
