= McDowall (surname) =

McDowall, MacDowall or Macdowall is a surname. Notable people with the surname include:

- Adrian J. McDowall, Scottish film director
- Alex MacDowall (born 1991), British auto racing driver
- Andrew McDowall (1913–1981), British flying ace with the Royal Air Force
- Archibald McDowall (1841–1918), Australian surveyor
- Betty McDowall, Australian actress
- Bob McDowall (1939–2011), New Zealand ichthyologist
- Cecilia McDowall, (born 1951), British composer
- Charles McDowall (1862–1916), Australian politician
- Cyndra MacDowall (born 1953), Canadian artist
- David McDowall (disambiguation), several people
- Day Hort MacDowall (1850–1927), politician from old Northwest Territories, Canada
- Drew McDowall (born 1961), Scottish musician
- Duncan MacDowall (born 1963), English former professional footballer
- Frederick McDowall (1900–1975), New Zealand scientist
- Iain McDowall, Scottish writer
- Ian McDowall, American chief executive
- Jack McDowall (1905–1969), American football player
- Jai McDowall (born 1986), Scottish musician
- Jamie McDowall (born 1947), English cricketer
- Kenny McDowall (born 1963), Scottish footballer
- Les McDowall (1912–1991), Scottish footballer and manager
- Margaret McDowall (born 1936), Scottish swimmer
- Rachel McDowall (born 1984), English actress
- Robert Holford Macdowall Bosanquet (1841–1912), English scientist and music theorist
- Robert McDowall (1821–1894), Scottish-born Australian cricketer
- Roddy McDowall (1928–1998), Anglo-American actor
- Rose McDowall (born 1959), Scottish musician
- William MacDowall, Scottish priest and Master of Works to Mary, Queen of Scots and her mother Mary of Guise

== See also ==
- Clan Macdowall, Scottish clan
- Dowall
- McDowell (surname)
