= Lones–Dowell House =

Coordinates: 35.9469°N 84.0203°W

The Lones–Dowell House is a historic home located at 6341 Middlebrook Pike in Knoxville, Tennessee. Jacob Lones settled on the land in the late 18th century, but the home was not built until circa 1857. The home is generally believed to have been built by Jacob Lones' son, Charles Lones.

The house is named after its first and last owners.
