= Charlie Dowell =

Australian rules footballer

Personal information
- Full name: Charles Francis Dowell
- Born: 27 January 1888; Fitzroy North, Victoria
- Died: 10 December 1972; Bundaberg, Queensland
- Original team: North Fitzroy Juniors
- Height: 176 cm (5 ft 9 in)

Playing career^{1}
Years	Club	Games (Goals)
1911–1912	Fitzroy	8 (0)
- ^{1} Playing statistics correct to the end of 1912.

Charles Francis Dowell (27 January 1888 - 10 December 1972) was an Australian rules footballer for Fitzroy in the Victorian Football League (VFL).

Dowell began his VFL career for Fitzroy in 1911. He played his final VFL match in 1912 having played 8 matches.
