= John Dowall =

New Zealand Paralympic athlete (born 1965)

- Born: 19 December 1965 (age 60)
- Relatives: Shaun Kenny-Dowall (son)

John Dowall
Medal record

Men's para athletics

Representing New Zealand

Paralympic Games
Gold medal – first place	2000 Sydney	Javelin Throw - F44
Silver medal – second place	2000 Sydney	Shot Put - F44

John Dowall (born 19 December 1965) is a Paralympic athlete from New Zealand competing mainly in category F44 throwing events.

John has twice competed in the Paralympics, first in 1996 and then again in 2000. In 1996 he took part in the discus, javelin, long jump and shot put. In 2000 he took part in discus, pentathlon, won silver in shot put and gold medal in javelin.

== Personal life ==
Dowall lost his left leg below the knee in a lawnmower accident at the age of five. He is the father of the rugby league footballer Shaun Kenny-Dowall.
