= McDowell =

McDowell or MacDowell may refer to:

== People ==
- McDowell (surname), includes MacDowell
- McDowell Lake First Nation, Ontario, an Anisininew First Nation band government

== Places ==
=== Canada ===
- MacDowell Lake, a lake in Ontario

=== United States ===
- McDowell, Kentucky, an unincorporated community
- McDowell, Missouri, an unincorporated community
- McDowell County, North Carolina
- McDowell County, West Virginia
- McDowell Valley AVA, California wine region in Mendocino County
- MacDowell residency, formerly MacDowell Colony, an art colony in Peterborough, New Hampshire

== Streams ==
- McDowell Run (Bull Creek tributary), in southwestern Pennsylvania

== Other uses ==
- McDowell's No.1, a subsidiary of United Breweries Group in India
- McDowell, Obolensky Inc., a defunct American publisher

== See also ==
- McDowell's (disambiguation)
- McDowall (disambiguation)
- Dowell (disambiguation)
