= Erin Jeanne McDowell =

American cookbook author

- Born: 1986 or 1987 (age 38–39); Lawrence, Kansas
- Education: The Culinary Institute of America at Hyde Park
- Occupations: Author; recipe developer; food stylist; YouTuber

YouTube information
- Channel: @erin-jeanne-mcdowell
- Subscribers: 38,000
- Views: 1.4 million
- Last updated: January 15, 2025
- Website: www.erinjeannemcdowell.com

Erin Jeanne McDowell is an American cookbook author, recipe developer, food stylist, and YouTuber.

== Early life ==
McDowell grew up in Lawrence, Kansas. She began baking pies with her grandmother, Jeanne, when she was 14.

== Career ==
McDowell got her first job in a bakery when she was 16. A year later, she moved to New York to attend the Culinary Institute of America.

After being a community member of Food52 since 2009, McDowell began working for Food52 around 2013. She hosts Food52's YouTube cooking series, "Bake It Up a Notch".

Her debut cookbook, The Fearless Baker: Simple Secrets for Baking Like a Pro, was named one of The New York Times' "Best Baking Books of the Year" in 2017. Her next cookbook, 2020's The Book on Pie (2020) was a New York Times' bestseller. Her third cookbook, Savory Baking, was published in 2022.

In 2023, she appeared on Netflix's The Big Nailed It! Baking Challenge as a baking expert.

Her fourth cookbook, Bake Anything, was published in 2026, focusing on foundational recipes.

== Personal life ==
McDowell married Derek Laughren in 2019 at the New York City Hall. In 2022, they moved from North Bergen, New Jersey to Kansas City, Missouri. They filed a divorce in 2025

== Books ==
- The Fearless Baker: Simple Secrets for Baking Like a Pro (2017)
- The Book on Pie: Everything You Need to Know to Bake Perfect Pies (2020)
- Savory Baking: Recipes for Breakfast, Dinner, and Everything in Between (2022)
- Bake Anything: Essential Recipes and Techniques to Build On for Endless Possibilities (2026)
