= Up & Away (Gregory Douglass album) =

Studio album by Gregory Douglass
- Released: November 7, 2006
- Studio: A9 Studios; Digital Engine
- Genre: Indie rock, acoustic
- Length: 44:47
- Label: Emote Records
- Producer: Gregory Douglas; Stephen Holt

Gregory Douglass chronology
Stark (2005)	Up & Away (2006)	Retro Active : Volume 1 (2007)

Professional ratings
Review scores
Source	Rating
Indie-Music.com	link

Up & Away is a 2006 album from indie-rock artist Gregory Douglass. "Hang Around" was given a music video and was released on YouTube.

== Track listing ==
All tracks are written by Gregory Douglass.

No.	Title	Length
1.	"Light Don't Shine"	4:00
2.	"Sentimental Fury"	3:56
3.	"Living"	4:46
4.	"Hang Around"	3:35
5.	"Annabelle"	3:18
6.	"Into The Sunset"	3:47
7.	"Who Knows"	3:16
8.	"See You Cry"	3:30
9.	"There She Goes"	2:51
10.	"Don't Get Caught"	5:32
11.	"Up & Away"	6:02

== Personnel ==
Credits are adapted from the album's liner notes.

- Gregory Douglass – vocals (all tracks), clarinet (2)
- Seth Barbiero – bass (4, 5, 10)
- Stephen Holt – percussion (4)
- Martha Colby – cello (6, 7, 11)
- Tuck Stocking – Electric Guitar (9)
- Mike Zimmerman – Timpani (10)
