= Clan MacDowall =

Lowland Scottish clan

Clan MacDowall or MacDouall
- Mac Dubhghaill
- Crest: Issuant from a crest coronet Or, a Lion's paw erased and erected Proper holding a dagger point upwards Proper, hilted and pommelled Or
- Motto: Vincere Vel Mori (To conquer or die)

Profile
- Region: Lowlands

Chief
- Fergus Day Hort Macdowall of Garthland
- The Chief of the Name and Arms of Macdowall
- Seat: Barr Castle
Septs of Clan MacDowall or MacDouall
Coyle, Dole, Dougal, Dougall, Doyle, Dow, Dowdle, Dowall, Dowell, Dowler, Dowling, Dugle, Duvall, Duwall, Kyle, MacDewell, MacDill, MacDole, MacDool, MacDougall, McDougal, MacDouyl, M'Douwille, Macduoel, Mcdoual, Mcdoll, MacDowall, MacDowal, McDowall, McDowal, MacDowell, McDowell, MacDowile, MacDowile, MacDowile, MacDowilt, MacDuael, MacDuel, McDuhile, MacDull, Macduuyl, Macduyl, Makdougall, Makdull, Mcduwell, M'Gowall, Mactheuel
Clan branches
Macdowall of Garthland (chiefs)
Wahl family
Allied clans
Clan Comyn

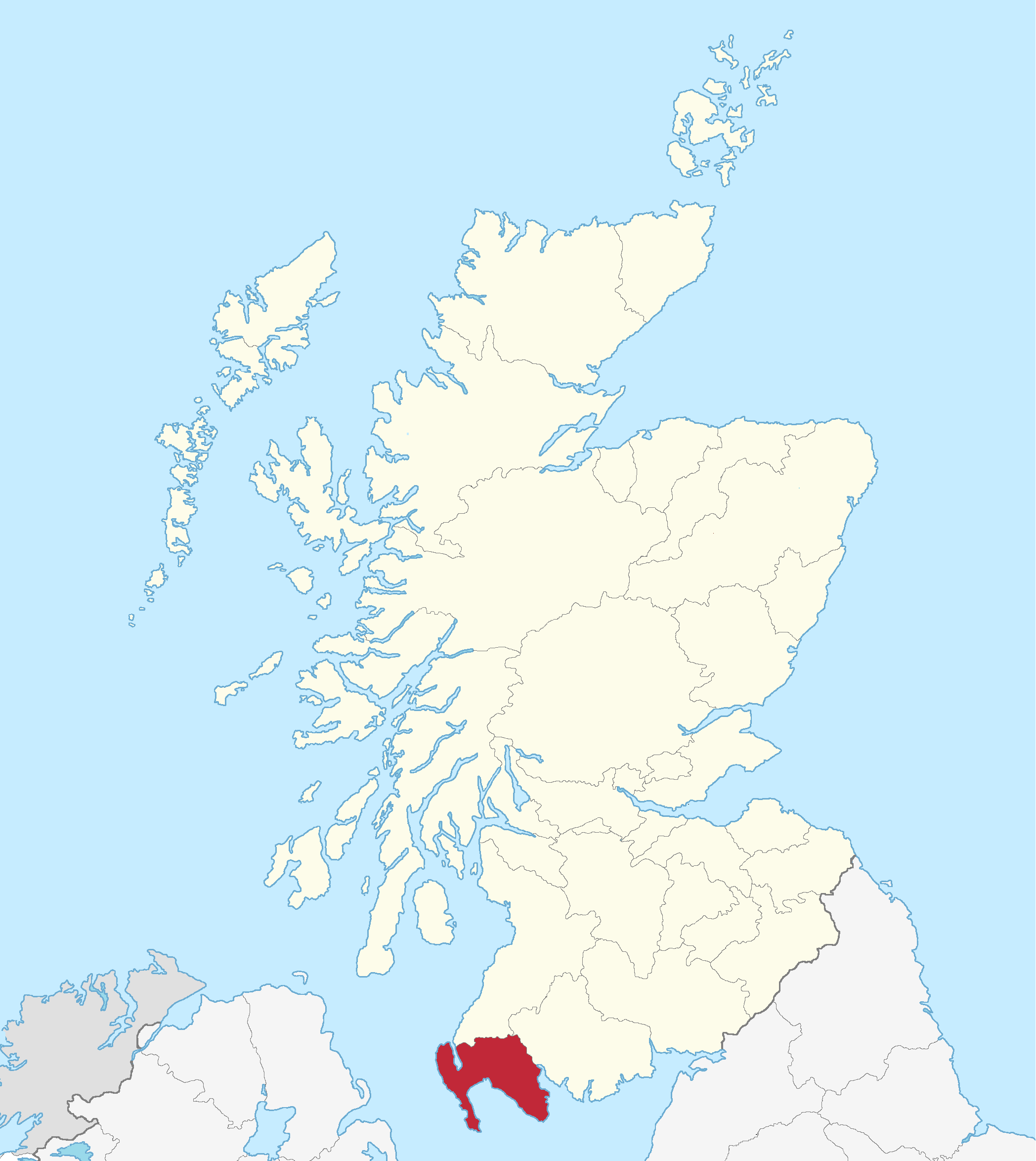
Wigtownshire, Galloway, Scotland

Clan MacDowall or MacDouall is a Lowlands Scottish clan.

== History ==
=== Origins of the clan ===
The name Macdowall is from the district of Galloway which itself was named after the Galli or Gaelic settlers of the seventh and eighth centuries. There are many legends surrounding the foundation of the princedom of Galloway and even historian Alexander Nisbet narrated that Dovall of Galloway killed Nothatus the Tyrant in 230 BC. The royal house of Galloway is said to have also resisted the Romans and Nesbit also stated that it was because of these early deeds that the lords included a fierce lion on their shield with a royal crown.

The Lords of Galloway were powerful and scattered their princedom with abbeys and priories. Fergus of Galloway was a Norse-Gaelic lord who flourished in the reign of David I of Scotland and he divided his princedom between his sons. One of his sons or grandsons was Dougal. The last native Lord of Galloway was Alan who died in about 1234. Alan's daughter was Devorgilla who married Balliol, Lord of Barnard Castle. Their son was John who claimed Galloway through his mother. In 1295 Balliol as Lord of Galloway granted a charter of the lands of Garthland to Dougal. In 1296 both Dougall and Fergus M'douall appear on the Ragman Rolls swearing fealty to Edward I of England.

=== 14th, 15th and 16th centuries ===
Dougal's grandson was Fergus, third of Garthland who during the reign of David II of Scotland was sheriff depute for Kirkcudbright. His grandson was Sir Fergus Macdowall, the fifth Laird who in 1401 was taken prisoner at the Battle of Homildon by the English.

Uchtred, the ninth of Garthland married Isobel Gordon of the branch of the Clan Gordon who controlled Lochinver. However he and his son Thomas were both killed at the Battle of Flodden in 1513 along with James IV of Scotland. John the eleventh Laird was also killed fighting the English at the Battle of Pinkie Cleugh in 1547.

John had passed his estates to his son, another Uchtred, before going to war. This Uchtred was implicated in the Raid of Ruthven when the Earl of Gowrie and other Protestant nobles kidnapped the young James VI of Scotland in 1582 and held him at Ruthven Castle and later Edinburgh Castle. Uchtred was later pardoned in 1584 for his involvement in the conspiracy and received a fresh charter from the king for the barony of Garthland and Corswall.

=== Modern history ===
James Macdowall and William Macdowall were the sixteenth and seventeenth Lairds respectively. During the seventeenth century, they were members of the Scottish Parliament for Wigtownshire. William and his wife, Grizel Beaton, had fourteen children. Their grandson, James Macdowall, became Lord Provost of Glasgow.

The twenty-first Macdowall Laird, William McDowall, was an advocate at the Scottish Bar and was elected to Parliament. From 1783 to his death in 1810, he served in the House of Commons at Westminster. He was succeeded by his nephew, William, who sold the clan lands of Garthland but transferred the name to his estate at Lochwinnoch, Renfrewshire. He and his brother died unmarried and the title passed to Lieutenant General Day Macdowall. At the end of the nineteenth century, the chiefly family of Macdowall emigrated to Canada.

Lesser-status MacDowalls were among those who were recruited by the English for plantations in Ireland in the early 18th century and many settled there.

== Clan chief ==
Prof. Fergus Day Hort Macdowall of Garthland is the current Chief of the Name and Arms.

== Clan castles ==
- Barr Castle, Garthland, Lochwinnoch, Renfrewshire is the present seat of the chief of Clan Macdowall.
- Garthland Castle was located near Garthland Mains, Stoneykirk, Rhins of Galloway, Wigtownshire, Dumfries and Galloway, Scotland. The castle was possibly built in 1211, as a datestone bearing that date has been discovered within the Garthland Mains estate. The castle was seat of the family of M'Dowall of Garthland.
- Logan Castle: In 1295 the McDouall family were granted lands in the Kirkmaiden Wigtownshire area by King John Balliol son of their half-sister, Dervorgilla, and built a stronghold at Castle Balzieland, which apparently burned down in about 1500. Today only the stump of one corner of this ancient castle still stands, as a spectacular ornament in the walled garden. The family moved to another residence close by, before building the current Logan House in AD1702. In about 1800 a walled kitchen garden was built to service Logan House, incorporating the remains of Castle Balzieland. James McDouall, Laird of Logan married Agnes Buchan-Hepburn and she passed on her love of gardening to her their sons, Kenneth and Douglas. In 1949, after about 700 years, the Logan estate passed out of McDouall / McDowell family hands.

== Branches of the clan ==
The main branches of the clan include:

- The MacDowalls anciently at Garthland Castle, Stoneykirk, Wigtownshire shown on a c.1747 military map at : The present seat is at Barr Castle, Garthland, Lochwinnoch, Renfrewshire.
- The MacDoualls of Freugh, Stoneykirk, Wigtownshire
- The MacDoualls of Logan, Kirkmaiden, Wigtownshire
- The MacDowalls of Machrimore, (Machermore, Machars, Old Luce, Wigtownshire in southern portion of Glenluce Parish prior to AD1707). Machermore is 3 miles S.E. from Glenluce. Uchtred Macdowall of Machermore m. Isobelle Gordon and they had a charter of the lands of Machermore, 7 July 1516. In 1576 Peter McDowell was fiar of Machermore, Glenluce. In AD1606 there were two charters of Cruggleton Castle Sorbie and the contiguous lands to James Kennedy, and Jaine Agnew his spouse : one from Peter M'Dowall of Machcrmore, Old Luce, Wigtownshire who seems to have been in actual possession under Sir John Vans, as superior; the second from Dominus Johannes Wauss de Longcastle, miles (soldier); signed Barnebarroch, who as superior confirmed the above 23 Sep. 1606. After Peter Macdowall of Machermore disponed Cruggleton castle in 1606, that Barony (MacDowall of Machermore) faded out. In 1626 Alex McDowell of Machermore, Wigtownshire, sold Physgill in Glasserton in Wigtownshire. This Machermore in Wigtownshire became the property of the Earl of Stair of nearby Sinnenness Castle.
- The Makdougals of Makerston, Jedburgh. Sir Fergus Maddougal / Macdowlle by charter (1373) knighted by King David II, witnessed a charter to Thomas MacDowall, Head of the Name granting him the family Baronies in Wigtownshire.

== Clan profile ==
- Chiefly arms: The current chief's coat of arms is blazoned: azure, a lion rampant argent crowned of a ducal coronet Or; Supporters: (on a compartment consisting of rocks with plant badge, issuing from the sea proper) two lions rampant, each gorged of an antique crown Or; Crest: (issuant from a crest coronet Or) a lion's paw erased and erected proper holding a dagger point upwards proper, hilted and pommelled Or; Motto: vincere vel mori. The motto translates from Latin as "to conquer or die". The chief's heraldic standard is blazoned: azure, a St Andrew's Cross argent in the hoist and of two tracts azure and argent, upon which is depicted the badge three times along with the motto "vincere vel mori" in letters azure upon two transverse bands Or.
- Clan member's crest badge: The crest badge suitable for members of the clan contains the chief's heraldic crest and motto. The crest is: (issuant from a crest coronet Or) A lion's paw erased and erected proper holding a dagger point upwards proper, hilted and pommelled Or. The motto is: vincere vel mori ("victory or death").
- Origin of the surname: The surname Macdowall and its variants are anglicised forms of the Gaelic Mac Dubhghaill, meaning "son of Dubhghall". The Gaelic personal name Dubhghall means "dark stranger".
- Branch Families, Septs and other spellings connected to Macdowall: Coyle, Dole, Dougal, Dougall, Doyle, Dow, Dowdle, Dowall, Dowell, Dowler, Dowling, Dugle, Duvall, Duwall, Kyle, MacDewell, MacDill, MacDole, MacDool, MacDougall, McDougal, MacDouyl, M'Douwille, Macduoel, Mcdoual, Mcdoll, MacDowall, MacDowal, McDowall, McDowal, MacDowell, McDowell, MacDowile, MacDowile, MacDowile, MacDowilt, MacDuael, MacDuel, McDuhile, MacDull, Macduuyl, Macduyl, Makdougall, Makdull, Mcduwell, M'Gowall, Mactheuel.

== Tartan ==
In 2007, Chief Fergus D. H. Macdowall of Garthland designed the Clan MacDowall tartan (the clan did not previously have one of its own, and used MacDougall or a Galloway district tartan). He registered it with the Lord Lyon King of Arms and Scottish Tartans Authority in 2008.

Tartan image	Notes
	Macdowall Tartan (STA Ref: 7260)

== See also ==
- Clan MacDougall, a separate clan which also derives its name from the Gaelic Mac Dubhghaill
