= Admiral Doyle =

Admiral Doyle may refer to:

- Austin K. Doyle (1898–1970), U.S. Navy admiral
- James H. Doyle (1897–1982), U.S. Navy vice admiral and namesake of the USS Doyle (FFG-39)
- James H. Doyle Jr. (1925–2018), U.S. Navy vice admiral
- Peter Hogarth Doyle (1925–2007), Royal Australian Navy rear admiral
- Robert Morris Doyle (1853–1925), U.S. Navy rear admiral
- USS Doyle (FFG-39), frigate launched in 1982, named after James Henry Doyle

== See also ==
- Warren D'Oyly (1867–1950), British Royal Navy vice admiral
