= James Doyle =

James Doyle may refer to:

== The arts ==
- James Francis Doyle (1840–1913), British architect
- James Doyle (dancer) (c.1888 –1927), partner artist (mainly in dancing performances) to Canadian tap dancer Harland Dixon
- James S. Doyle (born 1935), American journalist
- James William Edmund Doyle (1822–1892), English illustrator and antiquary
- Jimmy Doyle (musician) (1945–2006), Australian guitarist

== Politics and public service ==
- James Doyle (mayor) (1938–2016), mayor of Pawtucket, Rhode Island
- James Doyle (New Brunswick politician), member of the New Brunswick Legislative Assembly
- James Doyle II (born 1972), American state legislator in Rhode Island
- James Edward Doyle (1915–1987), United States federal judge in Wisconsin
- James H. Doyle (1897–1982), admiral in the United States Navy
- James H. Doyle Jr. (1925–2018), admiral in the United States Navy
- James William Doyle, Canadian politician
- Jim Doyle (Canadian politician) (born 1943), politician in British Columbia, Canada
- Jim Doyle (James Edward Doyle, born 1945), former governor of Wisconsin

== Sports ==
- James Doyle (jockey) (born 1988), English flat racing jockey
- James 'Chick' Doyle (1930–1985), Irish badminton player
- Jamie Doyle (footballer, born 1961), Scottish football player (Partick Thistle, Motherwell, Dumbarton)
- Jamie Doyle (footballer, born 1985), Scottish football player
- Jim Doyle (baseball) (1881–1912), American Major League Baseball infielder
- Jimmy Doyle (hurler) (1939–2015), Irish hurler
- Jimmy Doyle (boxer) (1924–1947), American welterweight boxer

== Other ==
- James Doyle (Ferns), Roman Catholic priest; involved in the Ferns Report, an Irish government inquiry
- James Edwin Doyle (1902–1989), advertising entrepreneur
- James Warren Doyle (1786–1834), Irish bishop
- Jimmy "Popeye" Doyle, a fictional character portrayed by Gene Hackman in the film The French Connection, and its sequel
