= USS Doyle =

USS Doyle has been the name of at least three ships in the United States Navy.

- USS Doyle (DMS-34), a Gleaves-class destroyer, from 1943 to 1945, then a fast minesweeper until 1955. Named for Richard Doyle, who fought during the Barbary Wars and was killed while in service in 1807.
- USS Cecil J. Doyle (DE-368), a John C. Butler-class destroyer escort from 1944 to 1946. Named for USMC aviator Lt. Cecil J. Doyle, posthumous recipient of the Navy Cross for heroism during 18 to 25 October 1942 in the Solomon Islands campaign.
- USS Doyle (FFG-39), an Oliver Hazard Perry-class guided missile frigate from 1983 to 2011. Named for Vice Admiral James Henry Doyle.
