= Robert Doyle (disambiguation) =

Robert Doyle (born 1953) is an Australian politician and the 103rd Lord Mayor of Melbourne.

Robert Doyle may also refer to:

- Robert Morris Doyle (1853–1925), rear admiral in the United States Navy
- Robert B. Doyle, Canadian judge
- Robert Doyle (footballer) (born 1951), Australian rules footballer

== See also ==
- Bob Doyle (disambiguation)
- Bobby Doyle (disambiguation)
