= Philippine Sea (disambiguation) =

Philippine Sea may have the following meanings:

- Philippine Sea, part of the western Pacific Ocean bordered by the Philippines, Taiwan, Japan, the Marianas, and Palau
- Battle of the Philippine Sea, a World War II naval battle between Japan and the United States
- Two ships of the United States Navy have been named USS Philippine Sea, after the Battle of the Philippine Sea in World War II
  - The first USS Philippine Sea (CV-47), an aircraft carrier in service from 1946 to 1958, and a participant in the Korean War
  - The second USS Philippine Sea (CG-58), a guided missile cruiser commissioned in 1989 and on active service as of 2020

== See also ==
- West Philippine Sea, an alternative name for a portion of the South China Sea
