= James H. Doyle Jr. =

US Navy admiral

Vice Admiral James Henry Doyle, Jr. USN
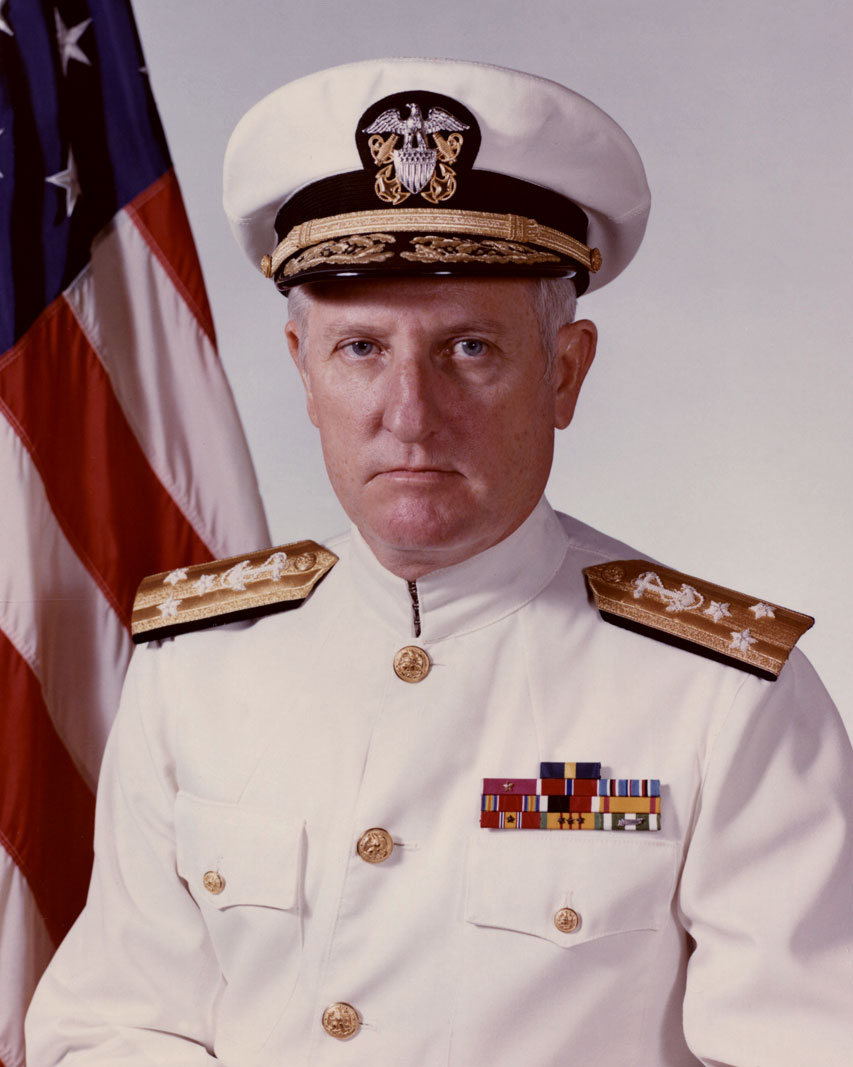
- VADM James H. Doyle, Jr.
- Born: March 27, 1925; Medford, Massachusetts
- Died: February 23, 2018 (aged 92); Bethesda, Maryland
- Spouse: Jeanette
- Children: Kathleen, James III, and Anne
- Relatives: VADM James H. Doyle (father)
- Military career
- Allegiance: United States
- Branch: United States Navy
- Service years: 1943-1980
- Rank: Vice admiral
- Commands: USS Bulwark (MSO-425), USS Redstart (MSF-378), USS John R. Craig (DD-885), USS Bainbridge (DLGN-25), Cruiser-Destroyer Group 12, Third Fleet

James Henry Doyle, Jr (27 March 1925 – 23 February 2018) was a vice admiral of the United States Navy, and the son of Vice Admiral James H. Doyle, USN.

== Early years ==
Doyle was born in Medford, Massachusetts, the eldest son of James Henry Doyle and Eleanor Ruth (nee Fields) from Passaic, New Jersey, as his father's ship happened to be at Boston Naval Shipyard for repairs. The naval family moved regularly, to Panama, the Philippines, San Diego, Hawaii, Norfolk, Berkeley, and Washington, D.C. His brother was born in 1939 while the family was in the Philippines. The family was at Honolulu, Hawaii at the time of the Japanese attack in 1941, with his father commanding USS Regulus. His ROTC unit was mobilized to guard the beaches against possible enemy landings.

After the family's evacuation to Berkeley, Doyle met his high school sweetheart, Jeannette Eleanor Blair. They were married on 5 June 1946.

Due to his disjointed schooling, Doyle needed a year of study at Drew Preparatory School in San Francisco before winning an appointment to the US Naval Academy by taking a competitive examination.

== Navy career ==
Doyle entered the Naval Academy in June 1943, and graduated on 5 June 1946 in the Class of 1947, a three-year wartime training class that retained its four-year designation. He and Jeanette married later in the day, at the Walter Reed Army Hospital Chapel with a reception at the nearby Shoreham Hotel. Famous classmates of Doyle's included: President Jimmy Carter; former CIA Director Stansfield Turner; Admiral Worth H. Bagley; Admiral, later Ambassador, William Crowe, Ambassador to the Court of St James's and former Chairman of the Joint Chiefs of Staff; Medal of Honor awardees, James Stockdale and Thomas Hudner; and US Senator Jeremiah Denton.

Following a short period of training at Jacksonville, Florida, the newly-weds travelled to California for a month's leave, before Doyle left for Japan and service in the cruiser USS Chicago leaving his wife to complete her degree at Berkeley.

Doyle became the officer in charge of number three turret, with three eight-inch guns and around 30 sailors, as their Division Officer. He was also catapult officer for the embarked Curtiss SC-1 seaplane. He was sent back to do gunnery training at Coronado, California, then rejoined Chicago at Bremerton Navy Yard as the ship was inactivated.

He was then posted to USS John W. Thomason, an Allen M. Sumner-class destroyer based at San Diego, for three years, making two deployments to the Western Pacific. His wife lived at the Navy accommodation, the Hotel Del Monte, later the Naval Postgraduate School, at Monterey, California. He was quickly qualified by the Commanding Officer as an Officer of the Deck when sailing independently, while undertaking the duties of Combat Information Centre Officer and Communications Officer. In 1949, as the Chinese Communists moved across the Yangtze River and took control of the capital, Shanghai, the Thomason was involved uniquely as the communications relay for the American Ambassador. The ship then evacuated the embassy staff, and steamed down the Yangtze River at general quarters, with star shells bursting overhead. His eldest daughter was born while he was on this deployment.

=== Legal training ===
Doyle took his father's example and wished to do legal training. He was allowed three years at George Washington University law school (1950–53) that coincided with the Korean War, in which his father was Commander of the Amphibious Forces during the invasion of Inchon with General Douglas MacArthur aboard the flagship, and also participated in the Hungnam evacuation and the blockade of Wonsan.

Among his professors at GWU was Dean of the school, Vice Admiral Oswald S. Colclough, who had served as Judge Advocate General of the Navy 1945-48 and Commander, Submarine Force, U.S. Pacific Fleet (COMSUBPAC) 1948–49.

Doyle received a degree of Juris Doctor with distinction, did the Washington D.C. bar exam, and was admitted to practice in California.

=== First command ===
After completing a short course at the Naval Justice School in Newport, Rhode Island, Doyle attended mine warfare school at Yorktown and then joined the minesweeper USS Bulwark, at the Norfolk Navy Shipyard, as its executive officer. He saw the ship completed in the yard, and undertook the work-up and commissioning training and some deployments.

In June 1954, Doyle became commanding officer of USS Ruff, a late World War II-constructed ship for sweeping fixed mines. He relieved his predecessor at Panama City, Florida, and then sailed to Charleston, South Carolina, its home port, and spent a little under a year as CO. Ruff was going into maintenance, and Doyle was picked to proceed to Long Beach, California, and command USS Redstart for a two-year tour. As well as fleet exercises, Redstart also deployed to the Western Pacific and operated out of Sasebo, Japan. During this period, the ship ran into the tail end of a typhoon and could only face into the swells and ride out the storm.

Between June 1957 to June 1959, Doyle served in the Judge Advocate General's International Law Division, in Washington. He was promoted to Lieutenant Commander during this posting.

=== Hawaii ===
He was next posted in June 1959 as Executive Officer of the USS John S. McCain, a destroyer leader ASW/gun ship commissioned in 1953, the second of the Mitscher-class destroyers. It was based in Honolulu, Hawaii, but John S. McCain regularly deployed to the Western Pacific.

In July 1960, Doyle became personal aide and flag lieutenant to Commander in Chief, United States Pacific Fleet, Admiral Herbert G. Hopwood, then Admiral John H. Sides, responsible for the Admiral’s personal communications, schedule, and trip arrangements. He spent two years there, and was promoted to Commander.

Doyle reported to the destroyer USS John R. Craig as Commanding Officer for the final stages of its Fleet Rehabilitation and Modernization (FRAM) overhaul at the Hunter's Point Naval Shipyard at San Francisco, California. This modernization notably added the SQS-23 sonar, RUR-5 ASROC anti-submarine rocket and the unmanned Destroyer Anti-Submarine Helicopter (DASH) to the lengthened hull. The ship did sea trials and fleet training in mid-1963, and relocated to its home port of San Diego. John R. Craig deployed to the western Pacific to operate with the United States Seventh Fleet. During this period, John R. Craig embarked special electronic countermeasures equipment and did a patrol along the maritime border of North Vietnam, to detect shore based gun fire control systems and communications between the systems. Shortly after, the Gulf of Tonkin incident occurred.

=== Nuclear training and service ===
While on a port visit to Subic Bay (Philippines) in John R. Craig, Doyle was ordered to Washington for interviews with Vice Admiral Hyman G. Rickover, head of Naval Reactors. Doyle already had orders to command USS Preble, a Coontz-class anti-air missile ship mounting the RIM-2 Terrier. However, Doyle was selected for nuclear power training, first to the school for six months at the Mare Island Naval Shipyard, Vallejo, California, then six months at the shore-based nuclear destroyer prototype power plant in West Milton, New York, completing training in June 1965.

With no nuclear ship CO positions available, Doyle was ordered to be the executive officer of the cruiser USS Newport News based in Norfolk, Virginia. The ship was the flagship of Commander Second Fleet, who was also Commander Striking Force Atlantic, a NATO Command.

Doyle was selected to command USS Bainbridge, but first had to pass the Nuclear Reactors "cram course" in Washington. On passing, Doyle was personally presented with a large paperweight which was engraved on one side, "Oh God, thy sea is so great and my boat is so small", and the other side, "Presented to Captain James H. Doyle, Jr., USN, by Vice Admiral H.G. Rickover, USN." He relieved Captain Hal Cushman Castle, in the Gulf of Tonkin in December 1966, spending almost four years in command.

In 1966-67, Bainbridge operated with USS Long Beach and USS Enterprise, primarily off Vietnam in the Tonkin Gulf on Yankee Station supporting the Enterprise aircraft doing air strikes into Vietnam. However, there was a notable port visit: On 8 March 1967, Bainbridge departed Vietnamese waters and arrived in Fremantle, Western Australia, the port city of Perth, the capital of Western Australia, on 13 March. The total distance was about 3,000 nautical miles (5,600 km), at an average speed was 25 knots (46 km/h; 29 mph). From there, the ship sailed 3,000 miles via the Lombok Strait (Indonesia) to Subic Bay, at an average speed of 29.2 knots (54.1 km/h; 33.6 mph).

Doyle then oversaw the first refuelling of Bainbridge (September 1967 – July 1968) at Mare Island and the following inspection by Nuclear Reactors staff and Vice Admiral Rickover. During its next deployment, Bainbridge was accompanying Enterprise when that ship had a major fire onboard. For the 1970 deployment, Bainbridge again visited Australia, this time related to the bicentennial of Lieutenant James Cook's discovery landing on the east coast at Botany Bay on 29 April 1770.

=== Washington ===
Doyle then served in the Office of the Chief of Naval Operations (Admiral Elmo Zumwalt) in the Program Planning and Budgeting Office. This was involved in the early considerations of the Strategic Arms Limitation Talks (SALT 1) and the Anti-Ballistic Missile Treaty (ABM).

In 1971, Doyle was selected for flag rank, and was posted into the joint environment at the request of Admiral Thomas Moorer, Chairman of the Joint Chiefs of Staff, in the International Negotiations Division, for two years. He was on the US delegation for the Third United Nations Conference on the Law of the Sea convened in New York in 1973.

=== Flag command ===
Following this, Doyle commanded Cruiser-Destroyer Group 12, homeported in Mayport, Florida. During this period, he deployed at sea twice, commanding an air task group from USS America for deployment preparations, and USS Forrestal in the Mediterranean during the tensions around Cyprus.

Doyle was then selected as Commander, Third Fleet, based at Ford Island, Pearl Harbor, Hawaii, on promotion to vice admiral. He was responsible for controlling the response to Soviet Navy submarines detected using the underwater SOSUS monitoring system, and for training units assigned often enroute to Seventh Fleet operations. This included Rim of the Pacific (RIMPAC) exercises involving the navies of other nations. His staff developed and he instituted the Composite Warfare Coordinator (later Commander) concept.

=== Op-03 role ===
In 1975, Doyle returned to the Pentagon as the Deputy Chief of Naval Operations for Surface Warfare (Op-03), for what became a five year tenure, directing the development of plans and programs for all surface ships except aircraft carriers. During this time, USS Ticonderoga, featuring the first AEGIS radar and fire control system, was authorized in the 1977 budget, in light of a lack of political will to fund nuclear powered cruisers and destroyers.

Doyle's experience with nuclear operations meant that his suggestion for a systems approach to manning and training enabled the crew to be trained on the system as it was built, then commissioned by the crew rather than dockyard staff. This substantially shortened the time between the ship’s commissioning and operational readiness. It is arguably this approach that earned Doyle recognition when the shore-based AEGIS system development center, USS Rancocas in Moorestown, New Jersey, commissioned by Doyle and Rear Admiral Wayne E. Meyer (the "father of AEGIS") in 1977, was renamed the "Vice Admiral James H. Doyle, Jr. Combat System Engineering Development Site" (CSEDS) in May 2008.

Doyle's tenure also saw the requirements settled for the multi-mission Arleigh Burke-class destroyer, Whidbey Island-class dock landing ship, and Cimarron-class fleet replenishment oiler. Additionally, the Light Airborne Multi-Purpose System (LAMPS) ASW helicopter development, that became the SH-60B, was initiated by Op-03.

Doyle's wife, Jeanette, was the "launching lady" for USS Cimarron in 1981. Doyle retired from the US Navy on 1 September 1980. At his retirement ceremony, he was honored with the award of a second Distinguished Service Medal for service as Deputy CNO, Surface Warfare.

== Post-Navy ==
The Doyles retired to their home in Bethesda, Maryland, that they had owned since 1971. Doyle created a family corporation, JHD Inc., that allowed him to become a consultant to industry. That included RCA Missile and Surface Radar Systems, Johns Hopkins University Applied Physics Laboratory, General Dynamics, Martin Marietta, Presearch, Burdeshaw, Kaman, General Physics, Bath Iron Works, Vought, and Brunswick and Diagnostic Retrieval Systems.

== Personal ==
Doyle and his wife Jeanette had three children, Kathleen, James III, and Anne.

== Legacy ==
The Naval War College established the "Vice Admiral James H. Doyle, Jr., Military Operations and International Law Prizes."

USS Rancocas (LS-1) is the former name of an engineering development facility at the border between Moorestown Township and Mount Laurel Township, New Jersey. In May 2008, it was formally renamed the Vice Admiral James H. Doyle, Jr. Combat System Engineering Development Site (CSEDS).
