= Marios Iliopoulos (Greek businessman) =

Greek businessman

- Born: 18 September 1966 (age 59); Psychiko, Greece
- Occupations: Shipowner; Businessman
- Board member of: Co-founder & owner of Seajets; Owner of AEK Athens F.C. Minority shareholder of Juventus 3.5%

Marios Iliopoulos (Greek: Μάριος Ηλιόπουλος; born 18 September 1966) is a Greek shipowner and businessman. He is the co-founder and owner of the Greek ferry company Seajets and the controlling shareholder of the Greek football club AEK Athens F.C. In 2019, the High Court of London ruled that Iliopoulos had orchestrated the destruction of the tanker Brillante Virtuoso in a case of insurance fraud.

== Early life ==
Iliopoulos was born on 18 September 1966 in Psychiko, a suburb of Athens, the son of Panagiotis and Despoina Iliopoulos. He had two brothers, Yiannis (died 2017) and Antonis. He attended Athens College.

== Brillante Virtuoso ==
On 6 July 2011, the tanker Brillante Virtuoso, owned by a company controlled by Iliopoulos, was attacked and set on fire off the coast of Aden. The incident was initially reported as a pirate attack.

David Mockett, a surveyor appointed to investigate the damage, was killed by a car bomb in Yemen after expressing doubts about the insurance claim.

In 2019, the High Court of London ruled in a civil case that the fire had been deliberately set and that the fraud had been orchestrated and instigated by Iliopoulos. The court also noted that another tanker owned by Iliopoulos, the Elli, had been similarly destroyed by fire two years earlier, involving the same salvage companies and the same chief engineer.

Iliopoulos was arrested in London in 2016 on suspicion of conspiracy to commit fraud in connection with the case but was released without charge.

== Business career ==
In 1989 Iliopoulos and his father co-founded the Greek ferry company Seajets. As of 2026, Seajets' fleet consisted of 29 ships.

On June 10, 2024, Iliopoulos bought an 85% stake in Greek football team AEK Athens F.C. for an estimated €90 million. At the press conference Iliopoulos stated, “I will give my soul, my mind…my whole being to conquer titles”.

On October 12, 2024, Iliopoulos purchased a 3.5% stake in Italian football club Juventus, reportedly paying €32-34 million.
