= Carrier Strike Group 14 =

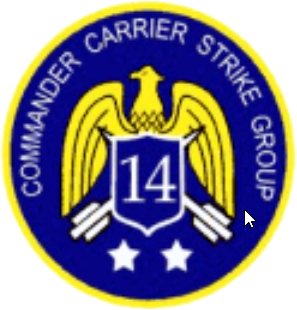
- Carrier Strike Group 14 crest
- Founded: 1 October 2004
- Disbanded: c.2011/2012?
- Country: United States
- Branch: United States Navy
- Type: Carrier Strike Group
- Role: Ballistic missile defense Regional air defense Battle space management Maritime interdiction operations Maritime security operations Cruise-missile strike operations
- Part of: United States Fleet Forces Command
- Garrison/HQ: Naval Station Mayport, Flor ida, U.S.
- Website: Navy Carrier Strike Group 14 website

Aircraft flown
- Helicopter: SH-60B Seahawk

Carrier Strike Group 14 (CSG-14 or CARSTRKGRU 14, sometimes with the "Fourteen" spelled out) was a U.S. Navy carrier strike group. The group was for some time the only U.S. carrier strike group that did not have an assigned aircraft carrier or carrier air wing. As of December 2010, it directed the cruisers USS Gettysburg (CG-64) and USS Philippine Sea (CG-58). Carrier Strike Group 14 was seemingly last based at Naval Station Mayport. Without a carrier flagship, it did not conduct the typical deployments of other carrier strike groups; instead, its two cruisers made independent voyages.

The group is not listed in the Administrative Organisation of the Operating Forces of the United States Navy: Fleet Chain of Command, March 2012, and thus appears to have been disestablished.

== Overview ==
The group commander exercised oversight of unit-level training, integrated training, and readiness for assigned units, as well as maintained administrative functions and material readiness tracking for the group's units.

The group reported to the commander of the United States Fleet Forces Command. The group's pre-deployment training and certification would have theoretically come under the control of Fleet Forces Command following the disestablishment of the U.S. Second Fleet on 30 September 2011. However, without a carrier assigned, the group does not conduct pre-deployment group workups.

Administratively, Gettysburg and the Philippine Sea were under the authority of the Commander, Naval Surface Force Atlantic.

Ticonderoga class cruisers provide a wide range of capabilities, including ballistic missile defense (BMD), regional air defense (RAD), battlespace management (BSM), maritime interdiction operations (MIO), maritime security operations (MSO), and precision strike Tomahawk (PST) strike missions.

== History 1973–2004 ==
Effective 30 June 1973, Commander Cruiser Destroyer Flotilla 12 was re-designated as Commander Cruiser-Destroyer Group 12 (CCDG-12). In May 1975, Leahy and USS Tattnall (DDG-19), under the command of Rear Admiral Justin D. Langille III, visited Leningrad, as reported by the Chicago Tribune on May 13, 1975. It appears the two ships formed a task group of Task Force 100 during the visit.

In 1986, while commanding Cruiser-Destroyer Group 12, Rear Admiral Henry H. Mauz, Jr., commanded the America carrier battle group and Task Group 60.3, part of Task Force 60, U.S. Sixth Fleet during an operation codenamed 'Attain Document', which led to the Action in the Gulf of Sidra (1986). The operation was intended to assert the freedom of navigation in the Gulf of Sidra as well as to challenge the territorial claims of Libya to the area. Subsequently, the America carrier battle group and the rest of Task Force 60 carried out Operation El Dorado Canyon, a series of punitive strikes against Libya in retaliation for the 1986 Berlin discotheque bombing.

Commander, Cruiser-Destroyer Group 12 previously served as Immediate Superior-in-Command for USS Enterprise (CVN-65), Carrier Air Wing Eight, Destroyer Squadron 18, USS Gettysburg (CG-64), and USS Philippine Sea (CG-58). CCDG-12 reported to Commander, Second Fleet as one of six carrier battle group Commanders in the Atlantic Fleet. CCDG-12's 2003 deployment included the destroyers USS Cole, USS Thorn, and USS Gonzalez.

On 1 September 2004, Commander, Cruiser Destroyer Group 12 transferred command of the USS Enterprise (CVN 65) and its Carrier Strike Group to Commander, Cruiser-Destroyer Group 8. This apparently left Cruiser-Destroyer Group 12 without an assigned aircraft carrier.

On 1 October 2004, Cruiser-Destroyer Group 12 was redesignated Carrier Strike Group 14.

As of 2010, Carrier Strike Group 14 may have been deactivated. The Navy's Strike Group 14 webpage is no longer active, and the admiral listed in command is no longer mentioned in the official US Navy biography website of currently active flag officers, suggesting this officer may have since retired.

It was announced on 22 October 2009 that the last listed commander of the group, Rear Admiral Bernard J McCullough, was to be reassigned from deputy chief of naval operations for integration of capabilities and resources, N8, Office of the Chief of Naval Operations, for reappointment to the grade of vice admiral and assignment as commander, Fleet Cyber Command/commander, Tenth Fleet, Fort Meade, Md.

== 2005 operations ==
On 25 May 2005, USS Philippine Sea departed Naval Station Mayport, Florida, for a four-month surge deployment in support of Maritime Inerdiction Operations (MIO) in the Persian Gulf and Mediterranean Sea, returning on 8 December 2005. USS Gettysburg and its embarked U.S. Coast Guard Law Enforcement Detachment (LEDET) completed a six-month Counter Narco-Terrorism operations in the western Hemisphere as part of Joint Interagency Task Force South which ended on 4 April 2006.

== 2006 operations ==
On 6 June 2006, USS Philippine Sea departed Naval Station Mayport for a six-months in support of maritime security operations (MSO) and Operation Iraqi Freedom in the Persian Gulf, returning 8 December.

== 2007 operations ==
USS Philippine Sea completed an Expeditionary Strike Group Integration (ESGINT) exercise and a 17-day Composite Unit Training Exercise (COMPTUEX) in preparation for its 2008 overseas deployment. On 6 July, USS Gettysburg departed Naval Station Mayport on a five-and-a-half month deployment involving Maritime Security Operations (MSO) in the Persian Gulf, including 71 consecutive days supporting Operation Iraqi Freedom (OIF) before returning on 19 December 2007.

== 2008 operations ==
During its U.S. Sixth Fleet deployment to the Mediterranean Sea, USS Philippine Sea (CG-58) tracked a contact of interest, the motor vessel Iran Bagheri, between 11–13 March 2008. Following 3-day port visit to Souda Bay, Crete, Philippine Sea participated in Caya Green 08, a bilateral two-phased military exercise with the Israel Defense Forces (IDF). Between 16–19 March, Phase I involved Philippine Sea leading U.S. naval assets conducting maritime patrols and harbor sweeps in Haifa with Israeli air assets. Following pre-sail planning meetings in Haifa, Phase II began on 24 March, and Philippine Sea and the Israeli Navy participated in small-boat defense, convoying operations, and anti-submarine warfare (ASW) against a non-nuclear diesel-electric submarine in a littoral environment. Following the conclusion of Caya Green 08, Philippine Sea departed Haifa on 26 March.

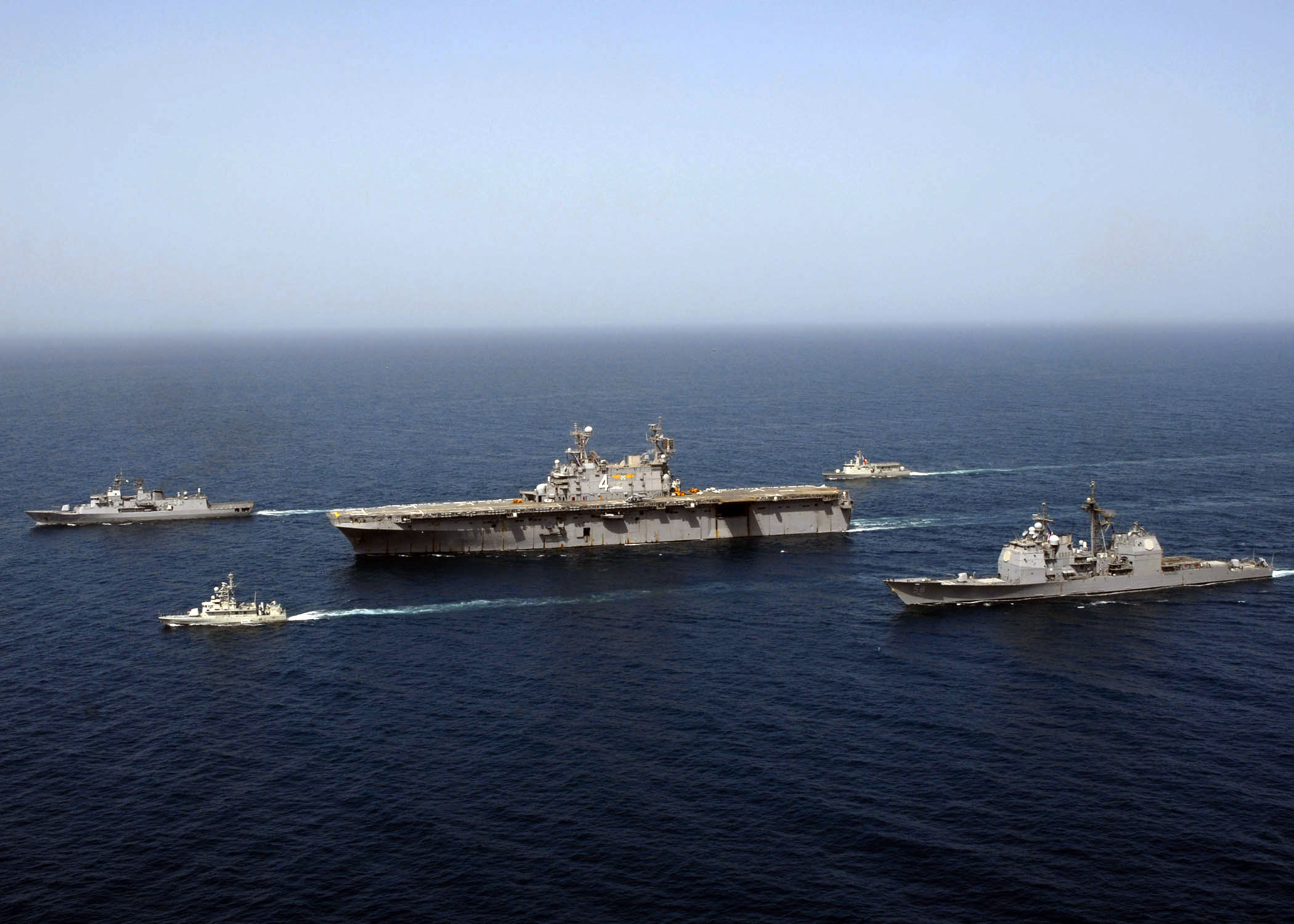
Goal Keeper III

On 29 March 2008, Philippine Sea transited the Suez Canal with the vehicle cargo ship Gilliland and the guided-missile destroyers Bulkeley and Ross. On 9 April, Philippine Sea escorted the departing amphibious assault ship Tarawa, and following a port visit to Fujairah, United Arab Emirates (UAE), Philippine Sea participated in Arabian Shark ’08/SHAREM, a multilateral anti-submarine warfare (ASW) exercise in the Gulf of Oman held between 14–20 April 2008. Following Arabian Shark ’08/SHAREM, between 22–20 April, Philippine Sea operated with Combined Task Force 158 (CTF-158) protecting the Al Basrah Oil Terminal, as well as conducting maritime security operations and maritime interception operation for the CTF-158, in the Persian Gulf. Following its second port visit to Jebel Ali, Philippine Sea participated in Goal Keeper III, a multilateral maritime security operation exercise (pictured), before returning to the CTF-158 area of responsibility (AOR) on 14 May. Following a four-day port visit to Bahrain, Philippine Sea completed its Persian Gulf tour of duty by escorting the amphibious assault ship Nassau, the dock landing ship Ashland, and the guided-missile destroyer Russell through the Straits of Hormuz on 31 April 2008. Philippine Sea completed its 2008 MED deployment with port visits to Aksaz, Turkey; Split, Croatia; and Sicily, Italy, before returning to Naval Station Norfolk on 11 July 2008.

== 2009 operations ==
On 21 February 2009, Ticonderoga-class guided-missile cruiser Gettysburg departed Naval Station Mayport. During its 2009 overseas deployment, Gettysburg served as the flagship of Combined Task Force (CTF-151), an international naval task force to counter piracy activity off the coast of Somalia, under the overall command of Rear Admiral Caner Bener of the Turkish Navy.

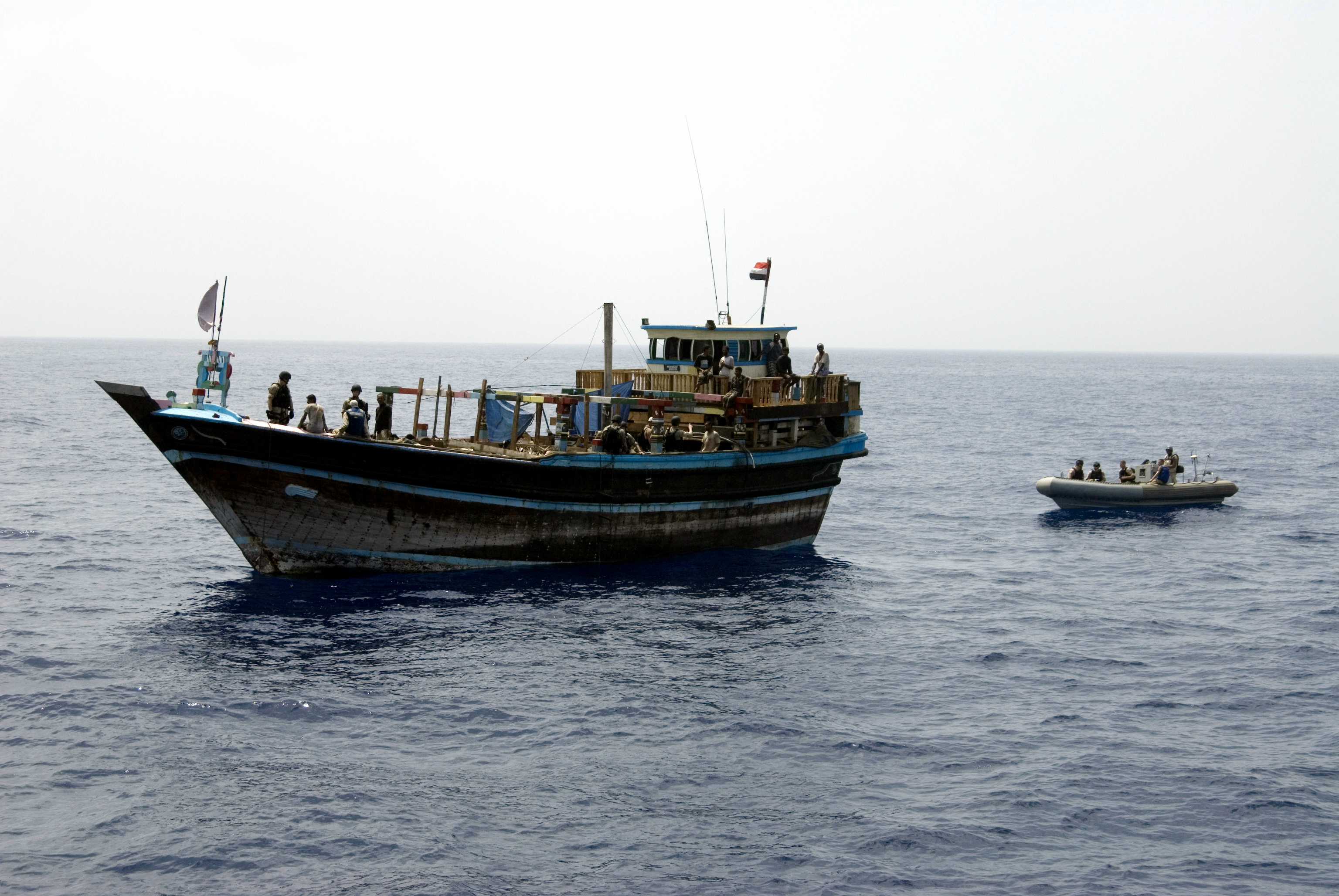
VBSS boarding (13 May 2009)

The most significant accomplishment during Gettysburg's tour of duty as CTF-151 was the capture of more than a dozen suspected pirates aboard an alleged "mothership" on 13 May 2009. The Republic of Korea destroyer Munmu the Great and Gettysburg responded to a distress call from the Egyptian-flagged merchantship MV Amira, which was under attack 75 nautical miles (138.9 km) south of Mukalla, Yemen. Helicopters were launched from Munmu and Gettysburg, which located Amira and a nearby dhow suspected of serving as a pirate "mothership" with approximately 17 people on board. Gettysburg's visit, board, search and seizure (VBSS) team and U.S. Coast Guard Law Enforcement Detachment 409 (LEDET-409) board the suspected dhow and discovered eight assault rifles, a rocket-propelled grenade launcher, and one rocket-propelled grenade (RPG). All 17 passengers were transferred to Gettysburg for further questioning.

On 28 June 2009, the guided-missile cruiser Anzio relieved USS Gettysburg (CG-64) as the flagship for Combined Task Force 151. Commenting on Gettysburg's three-month tour of duty as CTF-151's flagship, Admiral Bener noted:

Whatever the situation, whether engaged in the boarding or the safe and secure holding of suspected pirates for 28 days, Gettysburg undertook them all without complaint. The experience Gettysburg and her crew brought to our mission as flagship was a major key to our success in counterpiracy operations over the last couple months.

USS Gettysburg and embarked Helicopter Anti-submarine Squadron Light 46 (HSL-46) Detachment 9 returned to Naval Station Mayport on 28 July 2009.

== 2010 operations ==
USS Philippine Sea participated in a multinational NATO exercise called Joint Warrior, held 11–21 May 2010; it was then followed by a two-day port visit to Plymouth, England, and Faslane, Scotland. Both Gettysburg and USS Philippine Sea are undergoing training operations in the Atlantic Ocean.

== 2011 operations ==
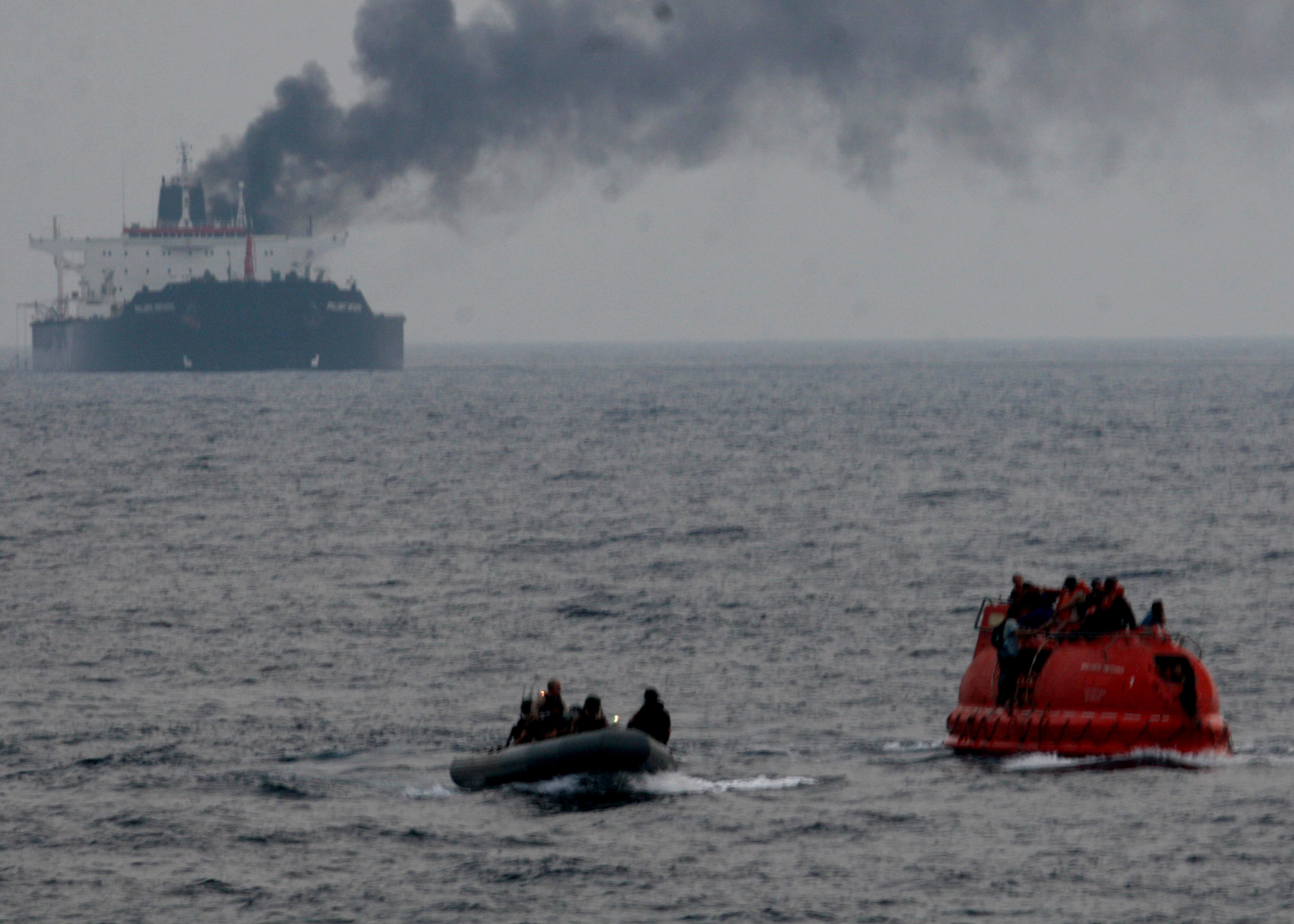
MT Brilliante Virtuoso (6 July 2011)

Gettysburg completed its Composite Training Unit Exercise (COMPTUEX) as part of the Carrier Strike Group Two on 10 February 2011. Gettysburg deployed with an embarked Helicopter Maritime Strike Squadron 70 (HSM-70) detachment as part of Carrier Strike Group Two, departing Naval Station Mayport on 10 May 2011. Gettysburg subsequently participated in NATO naval exercise Exercise Saxon Warrior off the coast of England.

On 3 June 2011, Philippine Sea paid a port visit to Kiel, Germany, prior to participating with the multi-national exercise Baltic Operations 2011 (BLATOPS-2011). This exercise included naval units from the United States, Russian, Danish, Polish and French navies, and BALTOPS-2011 ended on 21 June 2011.

On 6 July 2011, Philippine Sea rescued 26 Filipino crew members from the Marshall Islands-owned, Liberian-flagged supertanker Brillante Virtuoso (pictured) southwest of Aden, Yemen, after the ship's superstructure was set on fire following a reported pirate attack from the rocket-propelled grenades (RPG). Philippine Sea transited the Suez Canal on 1 July 2011.

Philippine Sea returned to her homebase on 15 November 2011, and Gettysburg returned on 8 December 2011.

== 2012 operations ==
On 17 September 2012, Gettysburg departed Norfolk to participate in the multi-national exercise Joint Warrior 12-2 held off the coast of Scotland from 1–11 October 2012. Gettysburg paid a port visits at HM Naval Base Clyde from 26–30 September and Portsmouth, England, from 13–18 October before returning to Norfolk on 31 October 2012.
