= Bob Doyle =

Bob Doyle may refer to:

- Bob Doyle (activist) (1916–2009), activist, World War II veteran and Irish member of the International Brigades during the Spanish Civil War
- Bob Doyle (politician), member of the Ohio House of Representatives, 1983–1992
- Bob Doyle (rugby league) (born 1944), Australian rugby player

== See also ==
- Robert Doyle (disambiguation)
- Bobby Doyle (disambiguation)
