= Bobby Doyle =

Bobby Doyle may refer to:

- Bobby Doyle (Scottish footballer) (1953–2019), former professional association footballer
- Bobby Doyle (Gaelic footballer), former Gaelic football player for Dublin
- Bobby Doyle (jazz vocalist) (1939–2006), jazz singer from Houston, Texas, who toured with Kenny Rogers

== See also ==
- Robert Doyle (disambiguation)
- Bob Doyle (disambiguation)
