= USS Philippine Sea (CG-58) =

Ticonderoga-class cruiser

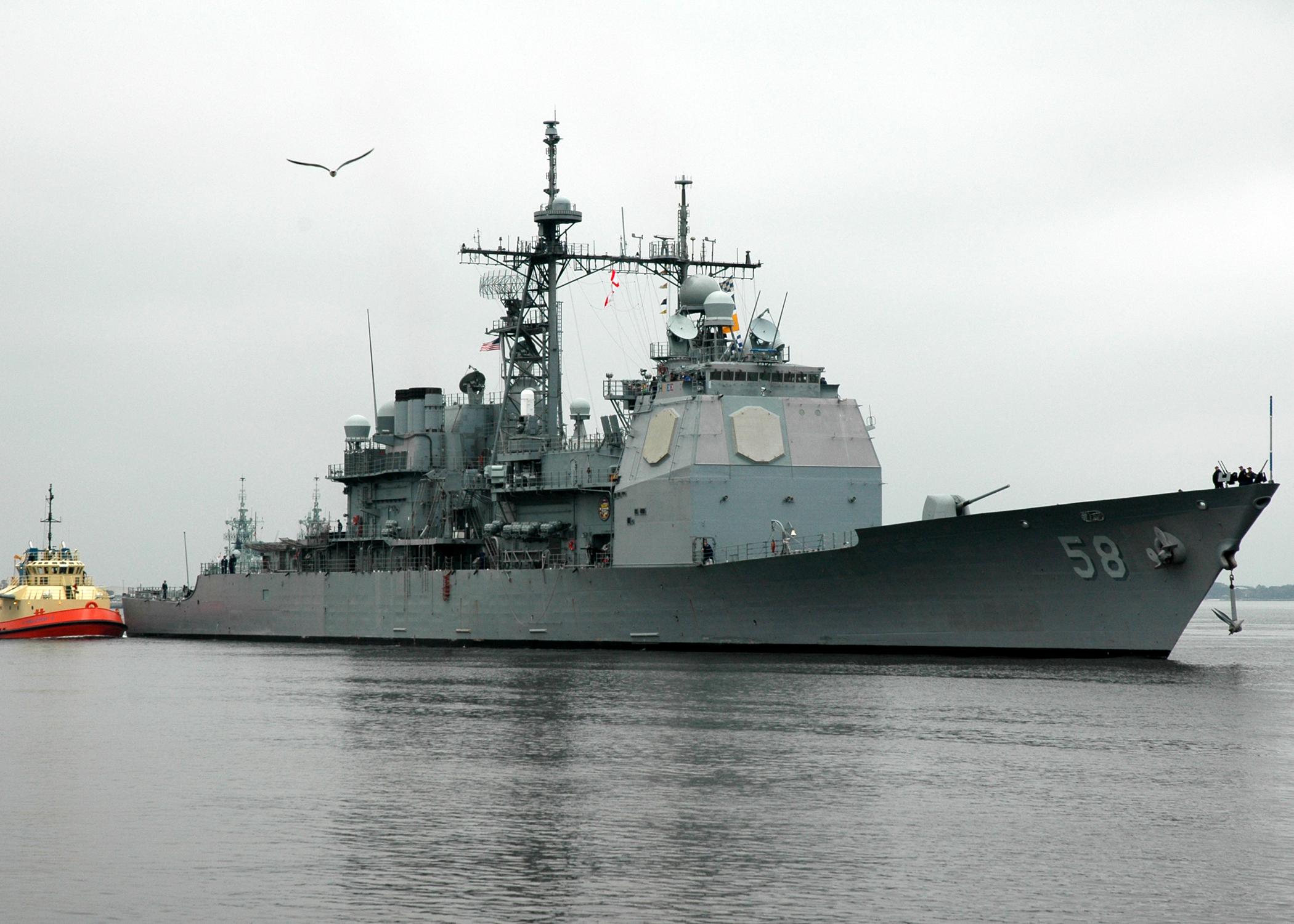
- USS Philippine Sea on 22 February 2005

History

United States
- Name: Philippine Sea
- Namesake: Battle of the Philippine Sea
- Ordered: 27 December 1983
- Builder: Bath Iron Works
- Laid down: 8 April 1986
- Launched: 12 July 1987
- Commissioned: 18 March 1989
- Decommissioned: 25 September 2025
- Stricken: October 2025
- Identification: Call sign: NWIN; Hull number: CG-58
- Motto: Eternal Vigilance
- Status: Decommissioned
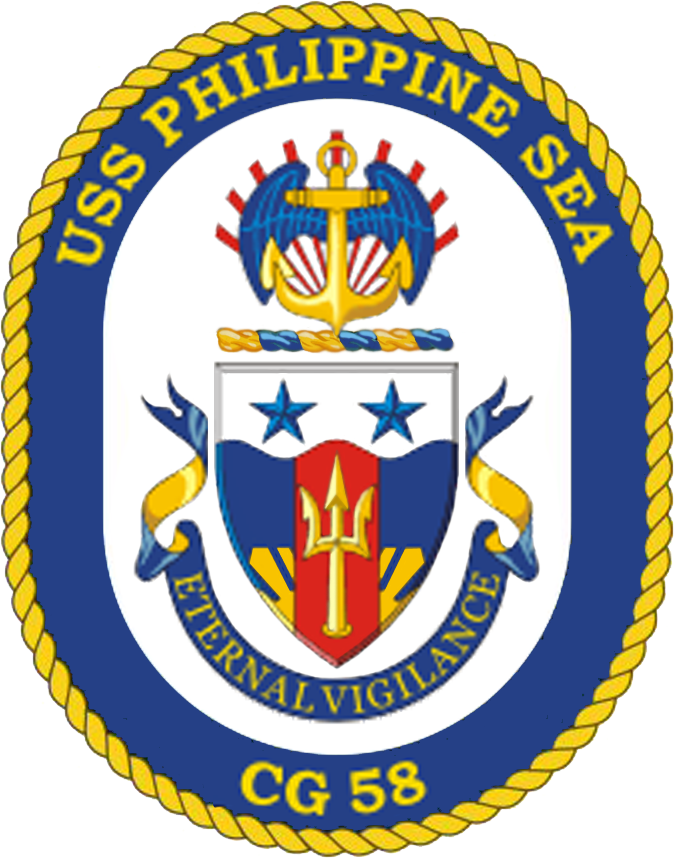
- Badge

General characteristics
- Class & type: Ticonderoga-class cruiser
- Displacement: Approx. 9,600 long tons (9,800 t) full load
- Length: 567 feet (173 m)
- Beam: 55 feet (16.8 meters)
- Draft: 34 feet (10.2 meters)
- Propulsion: 4 × General Electric LM2500 gas turbine engines; 2 × controllable-reversible pitch propellers; 2 × rudders
- Speed: 32.5 knots (60 km/h; 37.4 mph)
- Complement: 30 officers and 300 enlisted
- Sensors & processing systems: AN/SPY-1A/B multi-function radar; AN/SPS-49 air search radar (Removed on some ships); AN/SPG-62 fire control radar; AN/SPS-73 surface search radar; AN/SPQ-9 gun fire control radar; AN/SQQ-89(V)1/3 - A(V)15 Sonar suite, consisting of: AN/SQS-53B/C/D active sonar; AN/SQR-19 TACTAS, AN/SQR-19B ITASS, & MFTA passive sonar; AN/SQQ-28 light airborne multi-purpose system
- Armament: 2 × 61 cell Mk 41 vertical launch systems containing; 122 × mix of: RIM-66M-5 Standard SM-2MR Block IIIB; RIM-156A SM-2ER Block IV; RIM-161 SM-3; RIM-162A ESSM; RIM-174A Standard ERAM; BGM-109 Tomahawk; RUM-139A VL-ASROC; 8 × RGM-84 Harpoon missiles; 2 × 5 in (127 mm)/62 caliber Mark 45 Mod 4 lightweight gun; 2 × Mk 38 25 mm Machine Gun Systems; 2–4 × .50 in (12.7 mm) cal. machine gun; 2 × Phalanx CIWS Block 1B; 2 × Mk 32 12.75 in (324 mm) triple torpedo tubes
- Aircraft carried: 2 × MH-60R Seahawk LAMPS Mk III helicopters.

USS Philippine Sea (CG-58) is a decommissioned Flight II Ticonderoga-class guided missile cruiser of the United States Navy. She is named for the Battle of the Philippine Sea during World War II and is the second ship to bear the name. She completed multiple deployments as part of Operation Enduring Freedom from 2001 to 2014.

== Operational history ==
Philippine Sea was built by Bath Iron Works in Bath, Maine. Her keel was laid on 8 April 1986 and she was launched on 12 July 1987. Upon completion of her sea-trials after construction, Philippine Sea transferred to the Atlantic Fleet and was commissioned on 18 March 1989 in Portland, Maine. Her initial homeport was Naval Station Mayport, Florida.

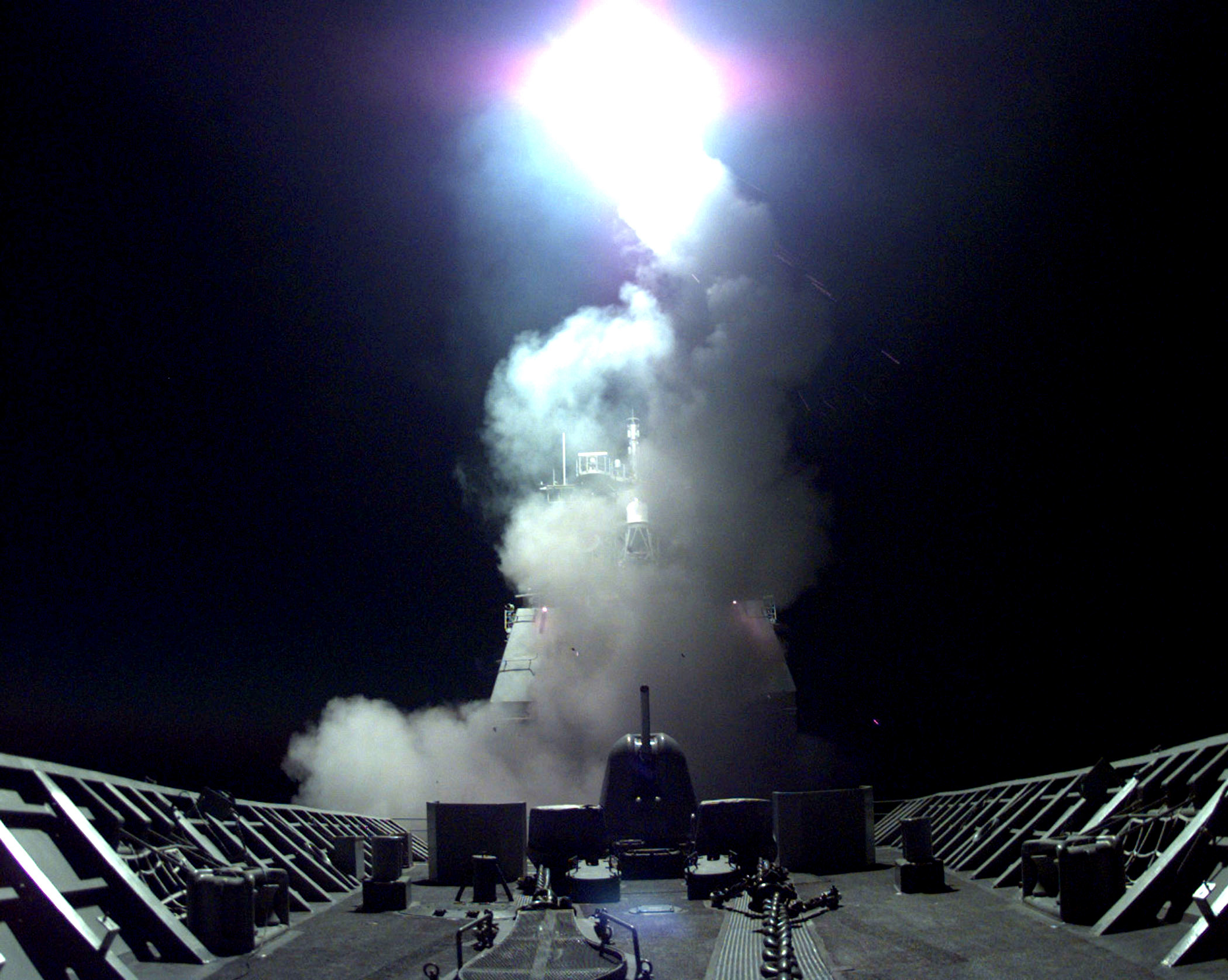
Philippine Sea launches a missile as part of Allied Force, 24 March 1999.

In 1999, for Operation Alled Force, Philippine Sea launched missiles, alongside USS Gonzalez, USS Albuquerque, USS Miami, and the Royal Navy submarine HMS Splendid.

In 2003, the ship was assigned to Cruiser-Destroyer Group 12.

In 2010, the ship failed her initial Board of Inspection and Survey (INSURV) inspection. On 7 May 2011, Philippine Sea departed Mayport for a scheduled overseas deployment to the U.S. Fifth Fleet and U.S. Sixth Fleet Area of Responsibility. On 3 June 2011, Philippine Sea paid a port visit to Kiel, Germany, prior to participating with the multi-national exercise Baltic Operations 2011 (BALTOPS-2011). This exercise included naval units from the United States, Russian, Danish, Polish and French navies, and BALTOPS-2011 ended on 21 June 2011. On 6 July 2011, Philippine Sea rescued 26 Filipino crew members from the Marshall Islands-owned, Liberian-flagged supertanker Brillante Virtuoso southwest of Aden, Yemen, after the ship's superstructure was set on fire following a reported attack by pirates using rocket-propelled grenades (RPG). Philippine Sea transited the Suez Canal on 1 July 2011.

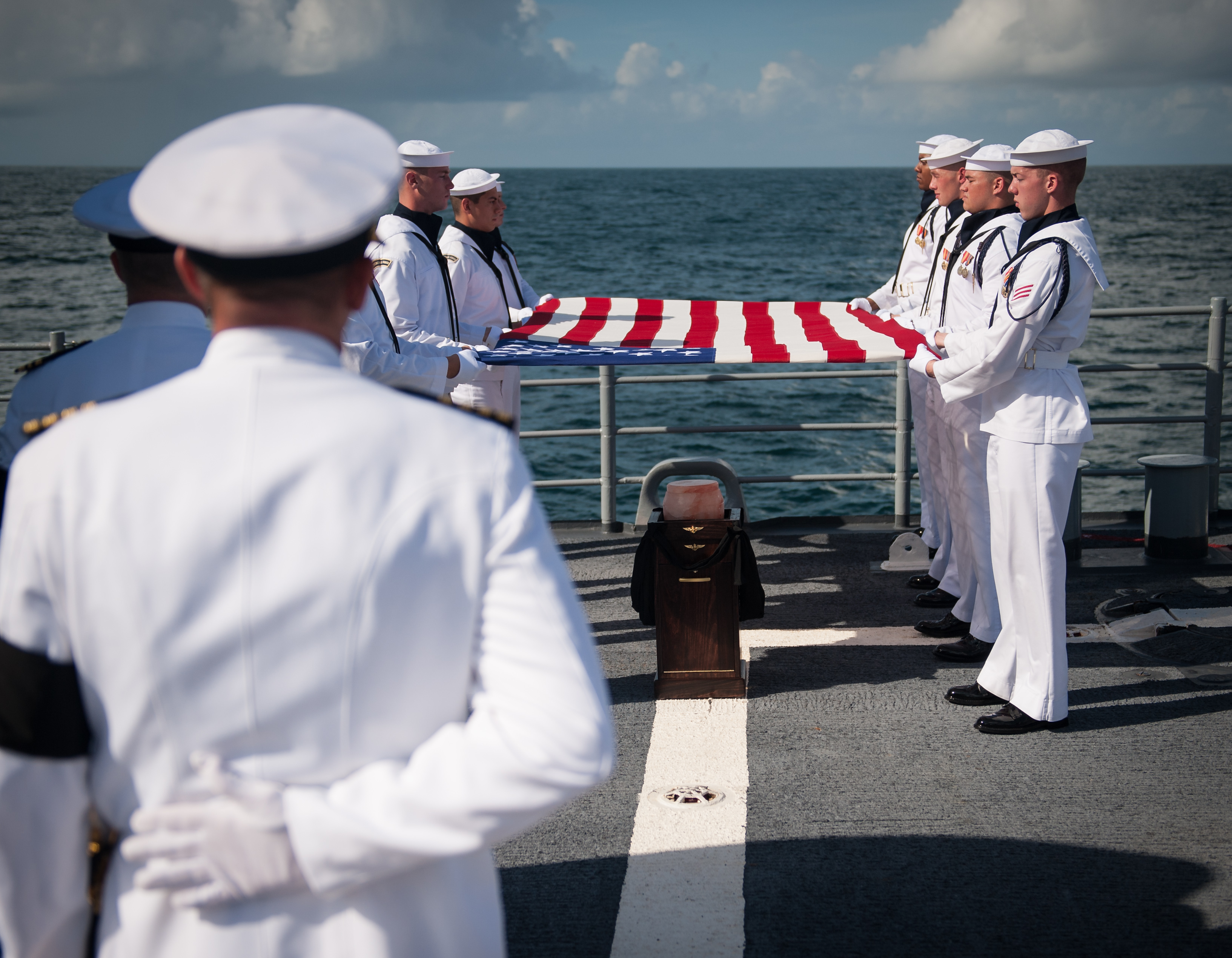
Neil Armstrong's burial at sea on 14 September 2012

The cremated remains of Neil Armstrong, the first man to walk on the Moon, were buried at sea from the warship on 14 September 2012, in the Atlantic Ocean.

Starting on 23 September 2014, USS Philippine Sea fired Tomahawk missiles in the Persian Gulf at sites in Syria, targeting Islamic State of Iraq and the Levant's command-and-control centers, training camps and weapons depots. The operation was expected to last several hours, with the first explosions from Tomahawk missiles heard near Raqqa in northern Syria. The USS Philippine Sea was part of the USS George H.W. Bush carrier strike group.

In June 2021, Philippine Sea left her homeport Naval Station Mayport, Florida to her new homeport Naval Station Norfolk, Virginia.

=== 2023 Israel-Hamas war ===
On 14 October 2023, Lloyd Austin directed Dwight D. Eisenhower and her carrier strike group, which included Philippine Sea, and destroyers Laboon, Mason and Gravely, to the eastern Mediterranean in response to the Gaza war. This is the second carrier strike group to be sent to the region in response to the conflict, following Gerald R. Ford and her group, which was dispatched only six days earlier.

=== United States–Houthi conflict (2023–present) ===
On 12 January 2024, Philippine Sea, Mason and Gravely fired Tomahawk cruise missiles at Iranian-backed Houthi rebels in Yemen. Aircraft from Carrier Air Wing Three, embarked on the carrier Dwight D. Eisenhower also participated in the strikes.

In March 2024, Philippine Sea and the Indian Navy destroyer INS Kolkata aided the crew of MV True Confidence following an Houthi missile strike on the ship. The surviving crew were evacuated to Djibouti.

In June 2024, Philippine Sea assisted in the rescue of the crew of MV Tutor attacked by Iranian-backed Houthis in the Red Sea. A helicopter from Helicopter Maritime Strike Squadron 74 airlifted 24 civilian mariners from the ship to Philippine Sea.

In January 2025, the Ticonderoga-class guided-missile cruiser USS Philippine Sea (CG 58) set sail on her final deployment after more than 35 years of service. On September 25, 2025, Philippine Sea was decommissioned alongside sister ship, Normandy. On October 20, 2025, the USS Philippine Sea was towed to the Philadelphia Navy Yard.

=== Awards ===
- Combat Action Ribbon - (Oct 2023 - Apr 2024)
- Joint Meritorious Unit Award - (Nov-Dec 1991)
- Navy Unit Commendation - (Jan-Feb 1991, Sep-Oct 2001, 19 Dec 2013, Jan-Dec 2013, Oct 2023-Jul 2024)
- Navy Meritorious Unit Commendation - (Jan-Jun 1994, Jan-Aug 2017)
- Battle "E" - (1993, 1994, 2000, 2001, 2012, 2013, 2014, 2017, 2018, 2023, 2024)
- Southwest Asia Service Medal - (Aug 1990-Feb 1991)
- James F. Chezek Memorial Gunnery Award - (1992)
- CNO Afloat Safety Award (LANTFLT) - (2005)

== See also ==
- Carrier Strike Group Two
