= Jamie Doyle (footballer, born 1985) =

Scottish footballer

Personal information
- Date of birth: 23 May 1985 (age 41)
- Place of birth: Glasgow, Scotland
- Position: Midfielder

Team information
- Current team: Shettleston

Senior career*
Years	Team	Apps	(Gls)
2002–2004	Leicester City	5	(0)
2004–2005	Ayr United	38	(10)
2005–2006	Albion Rovers	30	(1)
2007	Arbroath	20	(6)
2007–2009	Glenafton Athletic		
2009–2010	Clyde	7	(0)
2010	Lanark United		
2010–2011	Cumnock Juniors		
2011	Pollok		
2011–2012	Kirkintilloch Rob Roy		
2012–	Shettleston		
- * Club domestic league appearances and goals as of 16:15, 17 February 2013 (UTC)

Jamie Doyle (born 23 May 1985) is a Scottish football midfielder.

== Career ==
Doyle began his career with Leicester City making his senior debut against FC Barcelona in a pre season friendly. After a few loan spells at Canvey Island and failing to get regular first team football, he returned home to Scotland in January 2004 to join Ayr United. He scored a goal on his debut for Ayr, in a 2–1 defeat away to Inverness Caledonian Thistle. Doyle left Ayr in June 2005, and after 6 months without a club, he joined Albion Rovers. He stayed with the Coatbridge outfit for a year, making 34 appearances, before signing for Arbroath in January 2007 for a fee of £12,000. He only made 20 appearances for Arbroath, and dropped out of the senior game to sign for Junior side Glenafton Athletic.

After two years with Glenafton, Doyle took part in Clyde's open trials, and was rewarded with a one-year contract after impressing in a friendly with Partick Thistle. He terminated his contract in January 2010 after making seven appearances, returning to Junior football with Lanark United. Doyle later played for Cumnock Juniors, Pollok and Kirkintilloch Rob Roy before signing for Shettleston in October 2012.

On 12 October 2013 Jamie Doyle again terminated his contract with Junior Side Shotts Bon Accord due to unpaid wages.

He returned to Junior Side Shettleston again, after his released from Shotts Bon Accord.
