= Brillante Virtuoso =

Greek-owned Liberian-flagged suezmax tanker

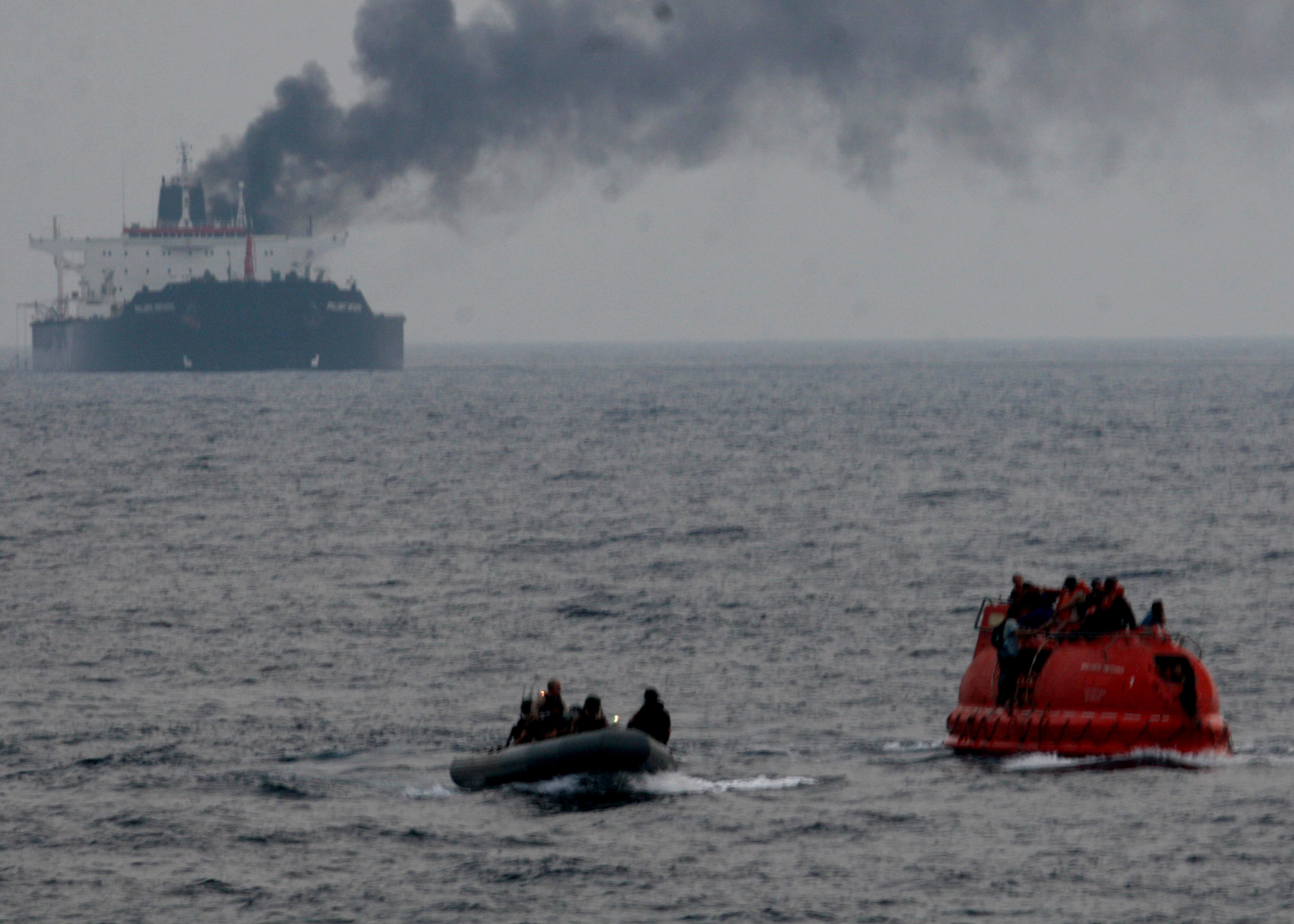
- Sailors from USS Philippine Sea rescue the crew of the Brillante Virtuoso

History

Liberia
- Name: St. Romauld (1992); Nandu (1992–2005); Stainless (2005–2008); Brillante Virtuoso (2008–2011)
- Owner: Suez Fortune Investment Ltd., Greece
- Port of registry: Marshall Islands
- Builder: Samsung Shipbuilding & Heavy Industries, Geoje, South Korea
- Launched: 7 March 1992
- In service: 1992
- Out of service: 2011
- Identification: IMO number: 9014822
- Fate: Scrapped

General characteristics
- Type: Oil tanker
- Tonnage: 80,569 GT; 149,601 DWT
- Length: 274 m (898 ft 11 in)
- Beam: 48 m (157 ft 6 in)
- Draught: 16 m (52 ft 6 in)
- Crew: 26

MT Brillante Virtuoso was a Greek-owned, Liberian-flagged suezmax tanker damaged beyond repair as part of an insurance fraud, which involved a faked hijacking by Yemenis posing as Somali pirates in the Gulf of Aden on 6 July 2011. A British High Court found that the faked attack was orchestrated and instigated by the vessel's beneficial owner, Marios Iliopoulos, who was at the time experiencing significant financial difficulties. As at 2025, Iliopoulos has not faced criminal prosecution for his role in the staged attack on the Brillante Virtuoso.

David Mockett, a British marine shipping surveyor and consultant who was investigating the incident, was reported to have believed that the attack on the Brillante Virtuoso was carried out by a criminal gang as part of an insurance fraud. According to the testimony of the ship's crew members, Iliopoulos and his employees were aware that Mockett's investigation had come to disagree with Iliopoulos' insurance claim. Before he could act further, Mockett was killed by a car bomb in Yemen on 20 July 2011. As of 2025, his murder remains unsolved.

A book on the events surrounding the ship by Bloomberg reporters Matthew Campbell and Kit Chellel, entitled Dead in the Water: A True Story of Hijacking, Murder, and a Global Maritime Conspiracy, was published in 2022.

== Ship history ==
The ship was built by Samsung Shipbuilding & Heavy Industries in Geoje, South Korea, in 1992. Originally named St. Romauld, she was soon renamed Nandu, then to Stainless in 2005, before becoming Brilliante Virtuoso in 2008. In 2011 she was registered in the Marshall Islands, and flying the flag of Liberia. In February 2012, Aryana Shipping bought the vessel and sent it to Gadani in Pakistan where it was scrapped.

== 2011 incident ==
Early on 6 July 2011, the ship was en route from Kerch, Ukraine, to Qingdao, China, with a cargo of fuel oil worth $100 million. Having transited the Suez Canal, and being approximately 20 nautical miles (37 km; 23 mi) south west of Aden, she reported being under attack by Somali pirates with small arms and a rocket-propelled grenade which had started a fire in the accommodation block of the ship's superstructure, and that the crew were abandoning ship. The United States Navy guided missile cruiser USS Philippine Sea, operating as part of the Combined Maritime Forces, responded and rescued the crew of 26, all Filipinos, but found no evidence of pirates. The ship's owners, Suez Fortune Investment Ltd., based in Greece, sent two tugboats from Aden to extinguish the fire and tow the vessel to safety. Subsequent surveys showed no signs of RPG damage or small arms fire penetration from outside, but evidence that AK-47s had been fired inside the ship.

=== Initial investigations ===
David Mockett, a British marine shipping surveyor and consultant, who was investigating the incident, was reported to have believed that the attack on Brillante Virtuoso was carried out by a criminal gang as part of an insurance fraud. Before he could act further, Mockett was killed by a car bomb in Yemen on 20 July 2011.

In the years after the alleged attack the insurers of the ship expressed doubt that the incident was caused by Somali pirates. They noted discrepancies in the captain's handling of the ship in dangerous waters versus what was standard practice.

Two years earlier, in 2009, a tanker Elli also beneficially owned by Marios Iliopoulos ran aground off the coast of Yemen following a fire. The chief engineer of the Elli was Nestor Tabares who was later the chief engineer of the Brillante Virtuoso. The two firms involved in the salvage of the Elli were the same two involved in the salvage of the Brillante Virtuoso.

=== Court case ===
On 7 October 2019, a High Court judge, Mr Justice Teare, ruled after a 52-day trial of the claim brought against the vessel's war risk underwriters that the so-called pirate attack was no such thing, and that the whole enterprise was a fake, and was orchestrated and instigated by the vessel's beneficial owner, Marios Iliopoulos, who was at the time experiencing significant financial difficulties. Co-conspirators included the master and chief engineer of the vessel, the local salvors, Poseidon Salvage (in particular Vassilios Vergos), and the hired "pirates," who were in fact present or former members of the Yemeni coast guard or navy.

=== Aftermath ===
On the 24 October 2021, Sir Gary Streeter (Member of Parliament for South West Devon) raised the matter in Parliament and summarised his views: 'First, I will set out the background to the matter, and the link between the murder of Captain Mockett and the commercial court case of the Brillante Virtuoso. Secondly, I will set out the many attempts that the family have made to seek justice, and the failings of our prosecuting authorities. Finally, I will spell out the steps that we wish the Minister to take to achieve justice for my constituents.'

In February and March 2022, BBC Radio Four broadcast three programmes on this matter.

Veteran Bloomberg journalists Matthew Campbell and Kit Chellel built upon their 2017 article to publish a book, Dead in the Water: A True Story of Hijacking, Murder, and a Global Maritime Conspiracy.
