= USS Bulwark (AM-425) =

Minesweeper of the United States Navy

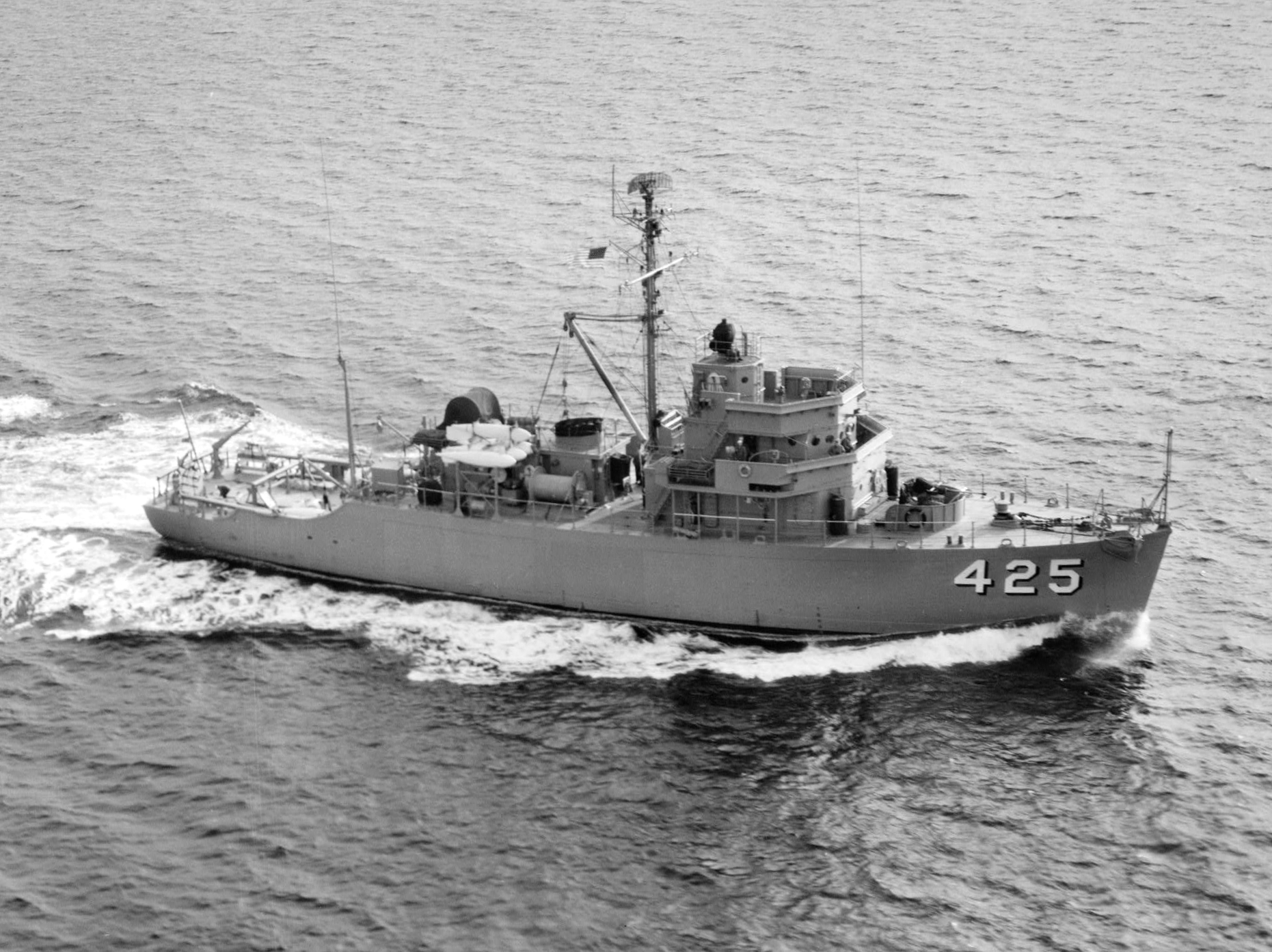
- USS Bulwark (MSO-425) underway c1954

History

United States
- Laid down: 12 December 1951
- Launched: 14 March 1953
- Commissioned: 12 November 1953
- Decommissioned: date unknown
- Stricken: 28 February 1975
- Home port: Charleston, South Carolina
- Fate: disposed of by Navy sale 1 May 1980

General characteristics
- Displacement: 620 tons
- Length: 172 ft (52 m)
- Beam: 36 ft (11 m)
- Draught: 10 ft (3.0 m)
- Speed: 16 knots
- Complement: 74
- Armament: one 40 mm mount

USS Bulwark (AM-425/MSO-425) was an Agile-class minesweeper acquired by the U.S. Navy for the task of removing mines that had been placed in the water to prevent the safe passage of ships.

Bulwark was launched 14 March 1953 by Norfolk Naval Shipyard; sponsored by Mrs. J. L. Maloney, wife of Captain Maloney, and commissioned 12 November 1953.

== East Coast operations ==
Bulwark conducted shakedown off Florida. During her first year of service she was engaged in a limited amount of duty due to her relatively new design which in the course of operations brought about numerous alterations.

In May 1955 Bulwark was ordered to join the U.S. 6th Fleet in the Mediterranean and on 18 May, with other members Or her division, she sailed into Lisbon, Portugal. Bulwark returned to Charleston, South Carolina., 4 October 1955.

Since that time she has operated out of Charleston conducting type training and exercises along the eastern seaboard and in the Caribbean.

== Decommissioning ==
Bulwark's classification was changed to MSO-425, 7 February 1955. Stricken 28 February 1975, she was disposed of by Navy sale 1 May 1980.
