= USS Doyle (FFG-39) =

1982 Oliver Hazard Perry-class frigate

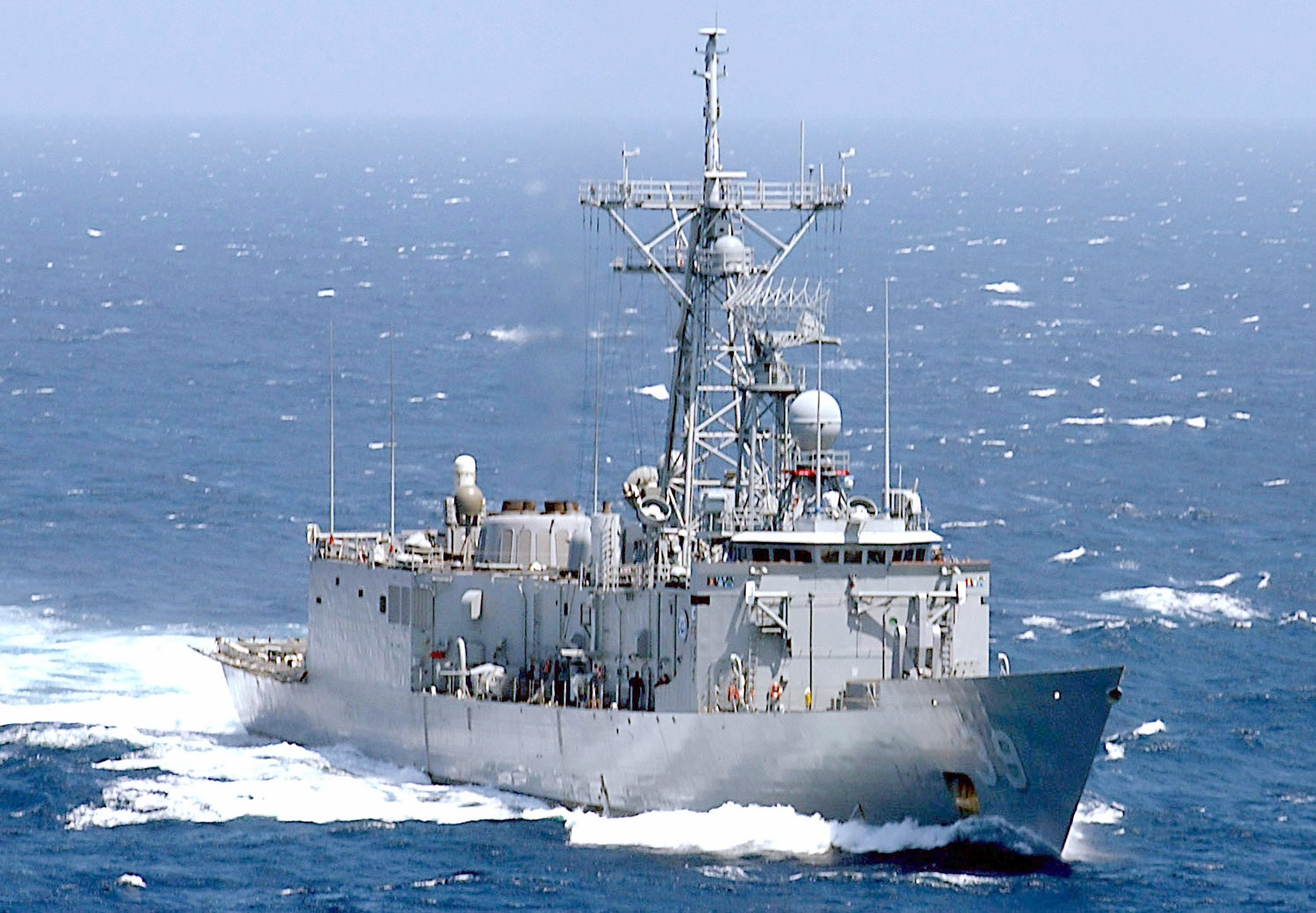
- USS Doyle (FFG-39)

History

United States
- Name: Doyle
- Namesake: Vice Admiral James Henry Doyle
- Awarded: 27 April 1979
- Builder: Bath Iron Works, Bath, Maine
- Laid down: 23 October 1981
- Launched: 22 May 1982
- Sponsored by: Mrs. Kathleen Doyle Watson; Ms. Anne Doyle
- Commissioned: 21 May 1983
- Decommissioned: 29 July 2011
- Stricken: 29 July 2011
- Home port: Naval Station Mayport (1983 to 2011)
- Identification: Hull symbol:FFG-39; Code letters:NJHD
- Nickname(s): "Valiant Mariner"
- Fate: Scrapped
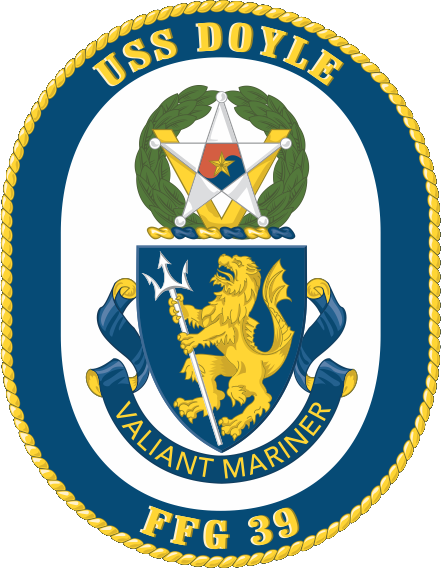
- Badge

General characteristics
- Class & type: Oliver Hazard Perry-class frigate
- Displacement: 4,100 long tons (4,200 t), full load
- Length: 453 feet (138 m), overall
- Beam: 45 feet (14 m)
- Draught: 22 feet (6.7 m)
- Propulsion: 2 × General Electric LM2500-30 gas turbines generating 41,000 shp (31 MW) through a single shaft and variable pitch propeller; 2 × Auxiliary Propulsion Units, 350 hp (260 kW) retractable electric azimuth thrusters for maneuvering and docking.
- Speed: over 29 knots (54 km/h)
- Range: 5,000 nautical miles at 18 knots (9,300 km at 33 km/h)
- Complement: 15 officers and 190 enlisted, plus SH-60 LAMPS detachment of roughly six officer pilots and 15 enlisted maintainers
- Sensors & processing systems: AN/SPS-49 air-search radar; AN/SPS-55 surface-search radar; CAS and STIR fire-control radar; AN/SQS-56 sonar.
- Electronic warfare & decoys: AN/SLQ-32
- Armament: As built: 1 × OTO Melara Mk 75 76 mm/62 caliber naval gun; 2 × Mk 32 triple-tube (324 mm) launchers for Mark 46 torpedoes; 1 × Vulcan Phalanx CIWS; 4 × .50-cal (12.7 mm) machine guns.; 1 × Mk 13 Mod 4 single-arm launcher for Harpoon anti-ship missiles and SM-1MR Standard anti-ship/air missiles (40 round magazine); Note: As of 2004, Mk 13 systems removed from all active US vessels of this class.
- Aircraft carried: 2 × SH-60 LAMPS III helicopters

USS Doyle (FFG-39) was the 30th ship to be constructed in the Oliver Hazard Perry class of guided missile frigates of the United States Navy. Doyle was named after Vice Admiral James Henry Doyle (1897–1982). Vice Admiral Doyle was most known for his contributions during the Korean War as Commander Amphibious Group One. The ship was in service from 21 May 1983 to 29 July 2011. During her 28 years of service, Doyle went on at least six deployments to the Mediterranean Sea and two deployments to the Persian Gulf, including participation in Operation Earnest Will. The ship also operated in the Black Sea, Baltic Sea, and deployed to operate with the Middle East Force. Doyle took part in UNITAS 39–98. Deployed to the Standing Naval Forces Atlantic, and conducted three Southern Command Deployments.

== History ==
Her keel was laid down by Bath Iron Works Corporation of Bath, Maine, on 23 October 1981. She was launched on 22 May 1982, sponsored by Mrs. Kathleen Doyle Watson and Ms. Anne Doyle, granddaughters of VADM Doyle. Doyle was commissioned on 21 May 1983.

Doyle deployed with the Nimitz Battle Group for Med 1–87 to the Sixth Fleet in the Mediterranean from 30 December 1986 – 30 June 1987. From 24 February to 3 March 1987, Doyle sailed in company with guided missile cruiser Josephus Daniels (CG-27) through the Turkish Straits and carried out freedom of navigation exercises in the Black Sea. On 1 March 1987, a Bulgarian (Druzki-class frigate (FF.12) trailed the U.S. ships, and the Soviets closely monitored their operations in the Black Sea. Doyle conducted surveillance of Soviet ships and submarines at an anchorage at Astypalaia, Greece from 3 to 12 March 1987. There were more significant incidents in adjacent years, 1986 Black Sea incident and 1988 Black Sea bumping incident.

During the fall of 1991, Doyle deployed with elements of Standing Naval Force Atlantic and embarked a CL-227 Maritime Aerial VTOL Unmanned System (MAVUS) for operational testing. Additionally, Helicopter Antisubmarine Squadron (Light) HSL-46 Detachment 8 “Rude Dogs” with a complement of 15 Naval Officers and enlisted was embarked for Anti-Submarine support.

During a counter narcotics deployment to the Caribbean, 4 April – 20 June 2005, Doyle, and Cutlass 463, her embarked Sikorsky SH-60B Seahawk of Helicopter Antisubmarine Squadron (Light) (HSL) 46 Detachment 3, pursued fishing vessel Dos Continentes, suspected of smuggling cocaine, north of the Panamanian/Colombian coast, 3 May. The smugglers set their boat ablaze and jumped overboard. Doyle launched Cutlass 463 and made for the scene at flank speed. She lowered a rigid hull inflatable boat (RHIB) that rescued four of the smugglers, and battled the fire for several hours until they extinguished the flames during the mid watch. The ship's damage control sailors, reinforced by Coast Guard law enforcement agents, boarded Dos Continentes and recovered several packages containing 150 pounds of cocaine from the hulk. Doyle prevented an estimated 13 tons of cocaine from entering the United States during this interception, and the U.S. later sank the vessel to prevent her from becoming a hazard to navigation. The frigate made a total of five interdictions during her deployment that led to the apprehension of 28 narco-terrorists, and the seizure or destruction of an estimated $315 million worth of cocaine (83 bales during the first month alone).

On 6 October 2005, Doyle returned from a six-month deployment.

On 6 December 2010, Doyle, her embarked SH-60B Seahawk from HSL-42, Proud Warrior 423, and her embarked Coast Guard Law Enforcement detachment, intercepted smuggling vessel Rio Tuira and seized 22 bales of cocaine, weighing approximately 500 kilograms (1,100 lb) and with an estimated street value of $15.4 million, in the Eastern Pacific about 180 miles from Panama.

On 5 April 2011, Doyle returned from her final deployment, a six-month deployment to the United States Southern Command.

== Fate ==
Doyle was decommissioned at Naval Station Mayport on 29 July 2011 after completing 27 years of service.

On 23 June 2018 ex-Doyle was towed to Southern Recycling, part of EMR, for dismantling.

== Awards ==
- Coast Guard Meritorious Unit Commendation, for service from 01-Nov-1985 to 28-Feb-1986
- Coast Guard SOS Ribbon, for service from 01-Jul-1987 to 30-Sep-1987
- Armed Forces Expeditionary Medal, for service from 11-Sep-1988 to 11-Jan-1989, Persian Gulf (24 Jul 87 – 1 Aug 90)
- Coast Guard SOS Ribbon, for service from 01-Oct-1989 to 31-Dec-1989
- Armed Forces Service Medal, for service from 17-Jun-1994 to 30-Jun-1994, 7-Jul-1994 to 17-Jul-1994 and 24-Jul-1994 to 8-Aug-1994, Bosnia
- Meritorious Unit Commendation, as a part of the George Washington battle group, for service from 11-Jun-1994 to 05-Nov-1994
- Meritorious Unit Commendation, as part of the Carl Vinson task group, for service from 10-Jul-1996 to 04-Sep-1996
- Joint Meritorious Unit Award, for service from 01-Jan-1997 to 31-Dec-1997
- Coast Guard Meritorious Unit Commendation, for service from 01-Apr-2005 to 30-Jun-2005
- Coast Guard SOS Ribbon, for service from 12-Jul-2005 to 16-Sep-2005
- Coast Guard SOS Ribbon, for service from 01-Oct-2010 to 30-Apr-2011
- Navy E Ribbon for 1994, 1996, 1998, 2000, 2007

== Coat of arms ==
The ship's motto was displayed on an azure doubled scroll with the inscription "Valiant Mariner" in gold letters.

The shield contained an Azure lion rampant with fishtail and grasping a trident point up argent. Dark blue and gold are colors traditionally used by the Navy and represent the sea and excellence. The creature, half lion and half fish, with Neptune's trident symbolized Admiral Doyle's military prowess and accomplishments in amphibious operations.

The crest contained the following: Upon a wreath of the colors a chevron reverse coupled or interlaced with mullet points balled argent, charged with a pentagram parted and colored in the manner of the Korean Taeguk (scarlet above, azure below) and charged with a gold mullet all encircled by a wreath of laurel vert. The stars, laurel wreath and "VEE" refer to some of Admiral Doyle's decorations and awards: The Distinguished Service Medal, Silver Star, Bronze Star Medal and the Legion of Merit. The reference to the Korean Taeguk commemorates Admiral Doyle's masterful exploits during the Korean War especially the invasion and the Hungnam withdrawal.
