= Robert Morris Doyle =

Rear Admiral Robert Morris Doyle
- Born: May 5, 1853; Dyersburg, TN
- Died: December 15, 1925 (aged 72) Miami, FL
- Branch: Navy
- Service years: 1875-1919
- Rank: Rear Admiral
- Conflicts: Spanish American War
- Spouse: Kate Amelia Doyle (1861-1947)

Robert Morris Doyle (May 5, 1853 – December 15, 1925) was a Rear Admiral in the United States Navy.

== Biography ==
Doyle was born on May 5, 1853, in Dyersburg, Tennessee. During the Spanish–American War, he was the navigating officer of the USS Dixie. He died of pneumonia on December 15, 1925, in Miami, Florida.

His last military posting was Commandant of the 14th Naval District at Pearl Harbor in 1918.

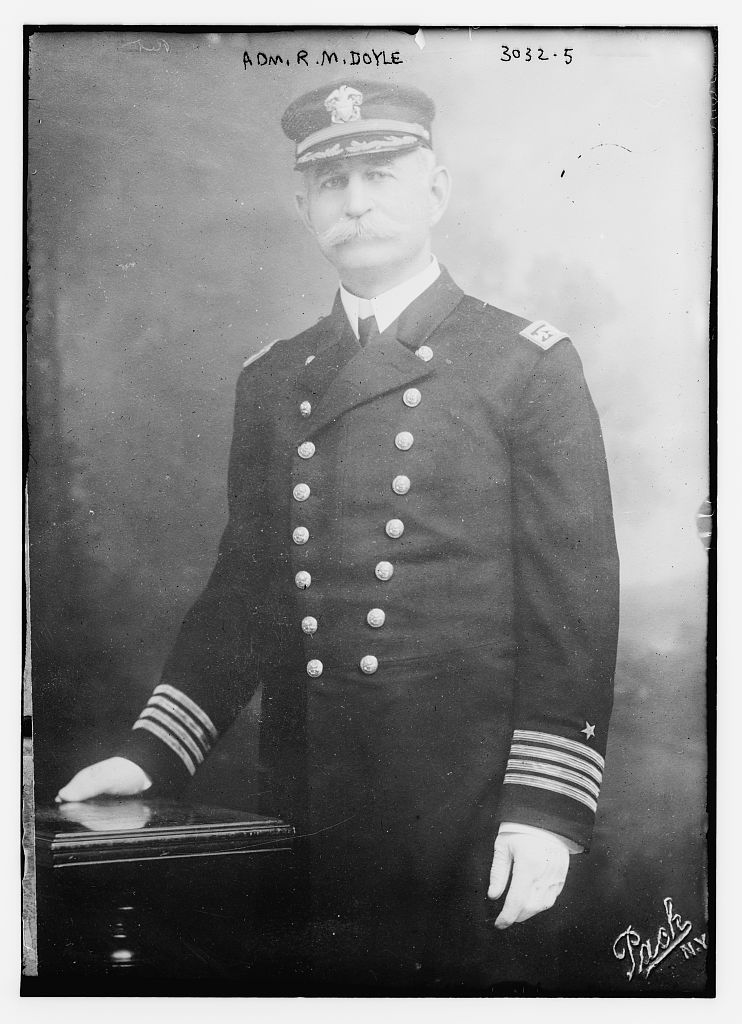
Doyle circa 1915
