= James H. Doyle =

American admiral (1897–1982)

James Henry Doyle
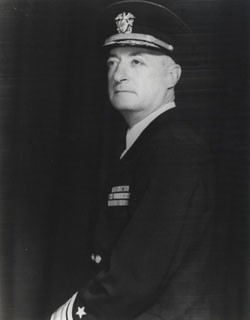
- Born: August 22, 1897; Jamaica, Queens, New York, U.S.
- Died: February 1, 1981 (aged 83); Oakland, California, U.S.
- Relatives: VADM James H. Doyle Jr. (son)
- Military career
- Allegiance: United States of America
- Branch: United States Navy
- Service years: 1919–1953
- Rank: Vice Admiral
- Commands: Amphibious Force, South Pacific; USS Pasadena; Amphibious Group 1
- Conflicts: World War I World War II: Guadalcanal Campaign; Solomon Islands campaign; Philippines Campaign; Korean War: Battle of Inchon
- Awards: Navy Distinguished Service Medal; Silver Star; Legion of Merit; Bronze Star Medal

James Henry Doyle (August 22, 1897 – February 1, 1981) was a vice admiral in the United States Navy. During the Korean War, he commanded the U.S. Navy, Marine, and Army forces of Amphibious Group 1, and was personally responsible for the execution of the amphibious phase of the Battle of Inchon in 1950. Admiral Doyle’s naval attack force put 13,000 Marines ashore on a coastline, together with all their heavy weapons and equipment. USS Doyle was named in his honor.

His son, James H. Doyle, Jr., was also a vice admiral.

== Biography ==
James Henry Doyle was born in Astoria, Long Island, New York, on 29 August 1897, son of John J. and Elizabeth (Johnson) Doyle. He attended the Jamaica Model School and Jamaica High School before entering the US Naval Academy in 1916 by appointment from the Second Congressional District of New York.

He served in World War I as a midshipman during the summers of 1917 and 1918 in the USS Arkansas and the USS Connecticut, successively. Graduating with the Class of 1920 on 6 June 1919, he was commissioned an ensign.

From his graduation in 1919 until August 1926, he served consecutively in the USS Mercury, USS Pennsylvania, USS George E. Badger, USS Delaware, and the USS Camden. On 1 August 1926 he reported for duty in the Office of the Judge Advocate General of the Navy, Navy Department, Washington, DC, and while so attached attended the George Washington University Law School. He graduated with distinction in 1929, receiving the degree of Bachelor of Laws.

Returning to duty afloat in July 1929, he joined the USS Lawrence as Executive Officer, and in August 1930 transferred in a similar capacity to the USS Buchanan. Detached from the latter in June 1932, he served the next three years in the Office of the Judge Advocate General, after which between June 1935 and June 1937 he was Aide and Flag Secretary on the Staff of Commander Destroyers, Battle Force, USS Detroit, flagship. He commanded the USS Sands until August 1938, and for the next two years was Aide to the Commandant, Sixteenth Naval District and the Navy Yard, Cavite, Philippine Islands. In August 1940 he assumed command of Destroyer Division 67 in the Atlantic, with additional duty as Commanding Officer of the USS Herndon. The next month that Division was turned over to the British Navy at Halifax, under the exchange of bases for destroyers agreement, and the Herndon was later renamed HMS Churchill.

On 24 September 1940, when detached from command of Destroyer Division 67, he reported as Commanding Officer of the USS Regulus, serving until May 1942. He then had duty on the staff of Commander Amphibious Force, South Pacific. He was awarded the Legion of Merit "For exceptionally meritorious conduct...during the Solomon Islands Campaign, from August 7, 1942 to July 15, 1943." The citation further states: "Displaying gallant determination and outstanding ability, (he) participated in the initial occupation of Guadalcanal and Tulagi and in all subsequent phases of the Solomon Islands Campaign during this hazardous period. Subjected to numerous enemy air attacks and bombardments by hostile shore batteries, he carried out his highly important tasks with the utmost courage, perseverance and heroic devotion to duty, thereby contributing in large measure to the success of our forces in that strategic area."

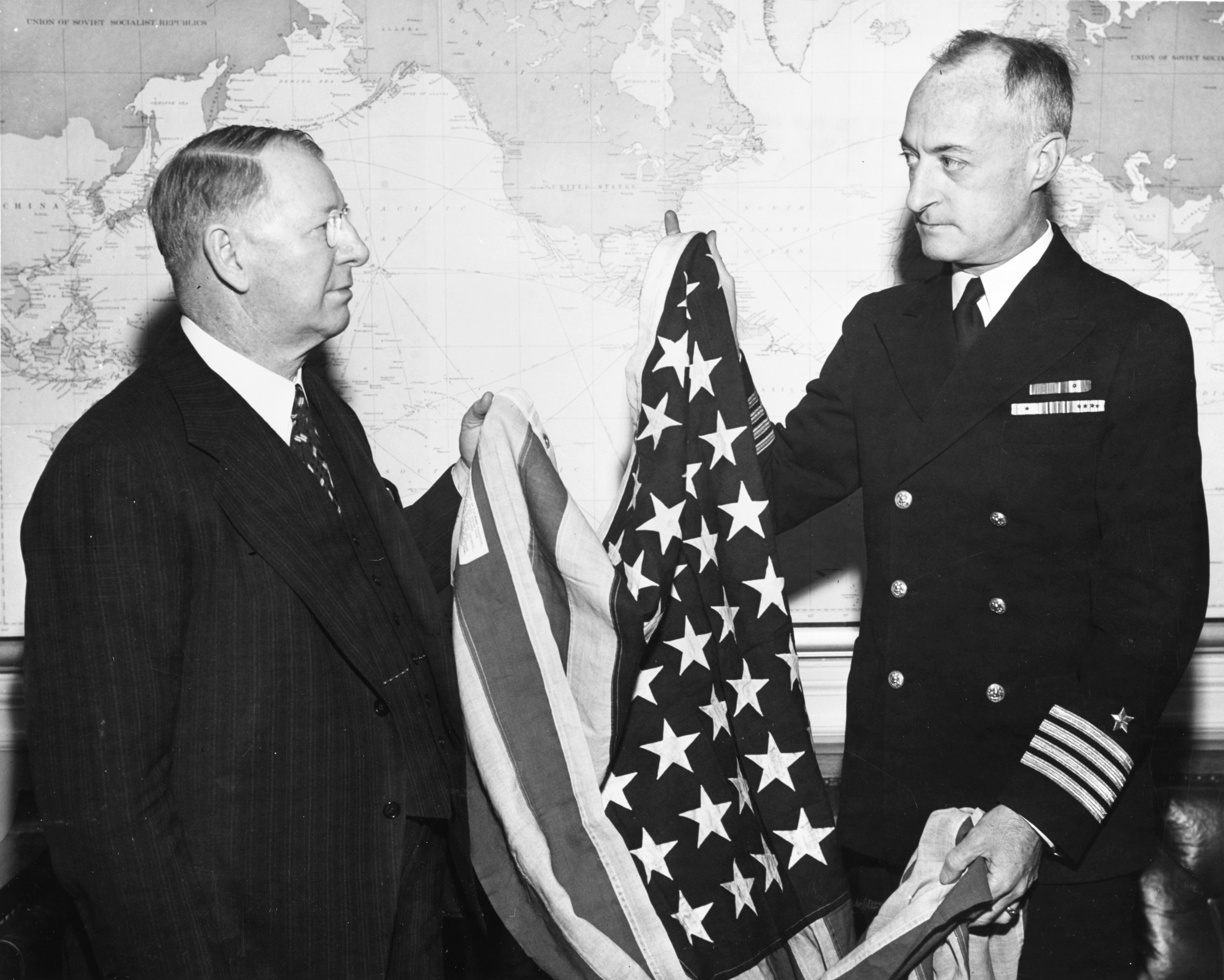
Secretary of the Navy Frank Knox is presented with the flag that flew over Kwajalein by Captain James H. Doyle.

He served in the Navy Department, Headquarters of the Commander in Chief, US Fleet, from November 1943 to April 1945, and after brief duty with Commander Cruisers, Pacific Fleet, he assumed command in May of that year of the USS Pasadena. He was awarded the Bronze Star Medal with Combat "V," for this final period of the war. The citation states in part: "For meritorious service as the Commanding Officer of the USS Pasadena...in the Western Pacific area from June 2 to September 1, 1945. Exercising ability and initiative, (he) skillfully directed his vessel in three anti-shipping sweeps and one shore bombardment in Japanese Empire home waters, in addition to outstanding service as a unit of the support force of the SECOND Carrier Task Force. Later, during the initial entry and occupation phases at Sagami Wan, (he) ably conducted his vessel as Flagship for the Commander of the Support Force..." Detached from command of the Pasadena in May 1946, he was a member of the Military Staff Committee of the Security Council, United Nations, at the United Nations Headquarters in New York. He remained there until September 1947, when he became Inspector-Instructor of Naval Reserves in the Thirteenth Naval District, with headquarters in Seattle, Washington. He was promoted to rear admiral to date from 7 August 1947. Ordered in January 1948 to the Amphibious Training Command, Pacific Fleet, based at Coronado, California, he assumed command of that unit on 26 March of that year, and in January 1950 reported as Commander Amphibious Group ONE, with additional duty as Commander Transport Squadron ONE. He was later detached from the additional duty.

For outstanding services during hostilities in the Korean area he was awarded the Army Silver Star Medal and the Distinguished Service Medal. The citations follow in part: Army Silver Star Medal - "(As)...Commander Attack Force, Joint Task Force SEVEN, United Nations Command, (he) distinguished himself by conspicuous gallantry in action in the Inchon-Seoul operation during the period September 15 to September 21, 1950. His actions contributed materially to the success of this operation..."

Distinguished Service Medal - "For exceptionally meritorious service...as the Commander Amphibious Group ONE, and Commander Task Force NINETY in operations against enemy forces in the Korean Area from June 25, 1950 to January 1, 1951. Directing the maneuvers of his various units with exceptional skill and foresight he was personally responsible for the success of the administrative landing of the FIRST Cavalry Division at Pohang-Dong, and for the planning and execution of the amphibious phases of the assault on Inchon and landings at Wonsan. Later, in the redeployment of friendly forces from Hungnam to Pusan, Rear Admiral Doyle, by his wise leadership, tireless efforts and profound knowledge of amphibious warfare, furnished the guidance for a unique and completely successful evacuation. His distinguished service throughout the whole of this critical period reflected the highest credit upon himself and the United States Naval Service."

In September 1951 he reported as President of the Board of Inspection and Survey in the Department of the Navy, and continued to serve in that capacity until May 1952, when he became Chairman of the Joint Amphibious Board, with headquarters at Little Creek, Virginia. He was relieved of all active duty pending his retirement effective 1 November 1953. On 1 November, he was transferred to the Retired List of the US Navy, and was advanced to the rank of vice admiral on the basis of combat service.

In addition to the Distinguished Service Medal, the Army Silver Star Medal, the Legion of Merit with Combat "V," and the Bronze Star Medal, also with "V," Rear Admiral Doyle has the World War I Victory Medal, Atlantic Fleet Clasp; the American Defense Service Medal, Fleet Clasp; the American Campaign Medal; Asiatic-Pacific Campaign Medal with one silver star and two bronze stars (seven engagements); the World War II Victory Medal; the Navy Occupation Service Medal, Asia Clasp; the National Defense Service Medal; the Korean Service Medal; the United Nations Service Medal; and the Philippine Liberation Ribbon.

He married the former Eleanor Ruth Fields of Brookline, Massachusetts. Their two sons are Vice Admiral James H. Doyle, Jr., USN (USNA Class of 1947); and John J. Doyle.

Vice Admiral Doyle was a member of the Bar of the District of Columbia and had been admitted to practice before the Supreme Court and Court of Appeals of the District. VADM Doyle died in Oakland, California, 1 February 1981.

== Decorations ==
Here is the ribbon bar of Vice admiral James H. Doyle:

1st Row	Navy Distinguished Service Medal		Silver Star	Legion of Merit with Combat "V"
2nd Row	Bronze Star Medal with Combat "V"	World War I Victory Medal with Atlantic Fleet Clasp	American Defense Service Medal with Fleet Clasp	American Campaign Medal
3rd Row	Asiatic Pacific Campaign Medal with seven service stars	World War II Victory Medal	Navy Occupation Service Medal	National Defense Service Medal
4th Row	Korean Service Medal with one service star	Philippine Liberation Medal with two stars	Korean Order of Military Merit	United Nations Korea Medal

== Attribution ==
Adapted from the biographical sketch for Vice Admiral James H. Doyle, USN, Navy Biographies Branch, OI-023, 21 December 1953, now part of the Modern Biographies files, Navy Department Library, Naval History & Heritage Command.
