= Clan Maxwell =

Scottish Lowland clan

- MacSuail
- Crest: A stag Proper, attired Argent, couchant before a Holly bush proper.
- Motto: Reviresco (I grow strong again).

Profile
- Region: Lowland
- District: Dumfries
- Clan Maxwell no longer has a chief, and is an armigerous clan
- Historic seat: Caerlaverock Castle
- Last Chief: William Maxwell of Carruchan
- Died: 1863
Septs of Clan Maxwell
Adair, Blackstock, Edgar, Egarr, Halldykes, Herries, Kirk, Kirkdale, Kirkhaugh, Kirkland, Kirko, Latimer, Latimore, Macetterick, Macettrick, Macgetrick, Macgettrich, Macgettrick, Macghittich, Machethrick, Macittrick, Mackethrick, Macketterick, Mackitterick, Mackittrick, Macsata, Macsetree, Maxey, Maxon, Maxton, Monreith, Moss, Nithdale, Paulk, Peacock, Poak, Pogue, Poke, Polk, Pollock, Pollok, Sturgeon, and Wardlaw
Clan branches
Maxwell of Cardoness
Maxwell of Monreith
Maxwells of Munches
Maxwell of Sprinkel
Maxwell of Pollock
Allied clans
Clan Pollock
Clan Heron
Clan Grierson
Clan Dinwoodie
Rival clans
Clan Johnstone
Clan Douglas

Clan Maxwell is a Scottish clan of the Scottish Lowlands and is recognized as such by the Lord Lyon King of Arms. However, as the clan does not currently have a chief, it is considered an armigerous clan.

== History ==
=== Origins of the clan ===
The claimed origin of the name Maxwell is that it comes from Maccus Well, a pool in the River Tweed near Kelso, Scottish Borders. Maccus or Magnus in Old Norse was believed to be a Norse chief who lived during the reign of David I of Scotland.

Sir John Maxwell was Chamberlain of Scotland but he died without issue and was succeeded by his younger brother, Aymer. From Aymer's sons sprang many branches of the family throughout south-west Scotland.

=== Wars of Scottish Independence ===
Sir Herbert Maxwell appears on the Ragman Rolls of 1296, swearing fealty to Edward I of England. Herbert's son, Eustace Maxwell held Caerlaverock Castle as a vassal of the English, however he later followed Robert the Bruce to the Battle of Bannockburn.

=== 15th and 16th centuries ===
Eustace's descendant, another Sir Herbert, was created Lord Maxwell in about 1440. He took a seat as a Lord of Parliament. A branch of the clan, the Maxwells of Monreith descend from his second son and they were later created baronets in 1681. John Maxwell, 4th Lord Maxwell was killed at the Battle of Flodden in 1513.

The fifth Lord Maxwell intrigued with King Henry VII of England. In 1526 the Maxwells supported Archibald Douglas, 6th Earl of Angus at the Battle of Melrose where they defeated the forces of Sir Walter Scott. However, by 1542 King James V of Scotland had appointed him Warden of the Marches. Also in 1542 Lord Maxwell was captured at the Battle of Solway Moss.

John Maxwell, the seventh Lord Maxwell was a devout Catholic throughout the Scottish Reformation and he was linked to a number of plots to restore Mary, Queen of Scots to the throne. After Mary was executed in 1587 and after the defeat of the Spanish Armada, Lord Maxwell continued to correspond with Philip II of Spain trying to gain support for a Catholic revolution. However Maxwell was killed in 1593 in a feud with the Clan Johnstone of Lockerbie. (See: Battle of Dryfe Sands). The feud continued and the next Lord Maxwell shot Sir James Johnstone. Maxwell's brother, Robert, succeeded to the Maxwell title and was created Earl of Nithsdale in 1620.

=== 17th century ===
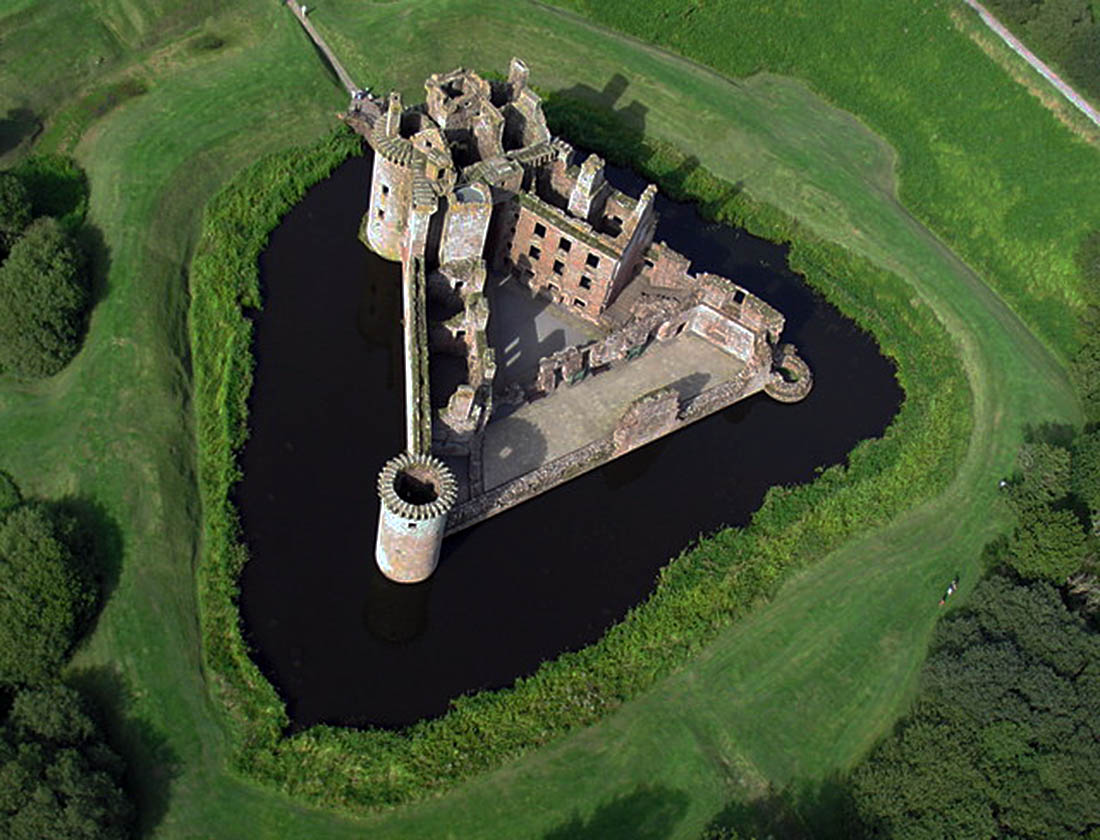
Caerlaverock Castle, historic seat of the chiefs of Clan Maxwell

Lord Maxwell was also at feud with the powerful Clan Douglas over the Earldom of Morton, which he regarded as his inheritance. For this quarrel he was imprisoned in Edinburgh Castle in 1607. After escaping, he shot Sir James in the back during a meeting held "under trust", and he fled to France. He was convicted of treason in his absence and sentenced to death. On his return to Scotland in 1612 he was arrested, and was beheaded at Edinburgh on 21 May 1613.

=== 18th century and Jacobite risings ===
The fifth Earl of Nithsdale was a staunch Jacobite and was captured at the Battle of Preston (1715) during the Jacobite rising of 1715. He was sentenced to death and imprisoned in the Tower of London. However, with the assistance of his wife Winifred, he disguised himself as a serving woman and the couple fled to Rome where the earl died in 1744.

== Notable People and Groups ==
- Barons Farnham
- Earls of Nithsdale
- Heron-Maxwell baronets
- Lords Herries of Terregles
- Maxwell baronets of Cardoness (1804)
- Maxwell baronets of Monreith (1681)
- Maxwell baronets of Orchardtoun (1663)
- Maxwell baronets of Pollok (1630)
- Maxwells of Munches
- Henry Maxwell (1669–1730)
- Peter Maxwell, Lord Maxwell
- James Clerk Maxwell
- Edward Maxwell
- William Herries Maxwell
- Robert Maxwell, 5th Lord Maxwell
- Robert Maxwell, 1st Earl of Nithsdale
- William Maxwell, 5th Earl of Nithsdale
- Sir Herbert Maxwell, 7th Baronet
- Wellwood Herries Maxwell
- Gavin Maxwell
- Catherine Maxwell Stuart, 21st Lady of Traquair
- Charles William Maxwell
- John Maxwell of Terraughty and Munches

== Castles ==
- Caerlaverock Castle was the seat of the chief of Clan Maxwell.
- Threave Castle was owned by the Clan Maxwell between 1526 and 1640.
- Maxwell Castle was built in 1545 but destroyed by the English in 1570.
- Buittle Castle owned by the Maxwells from the 16th century until 1984
- Newark Castle, Port Glasgow was built by the Clan Maxwell in the 15th century.
- Haggs Castle was owned by the Maxwells from 1585 to 1972.
- Pollok House, the seat of the Maxwell Baronets of Pollok, is now of international importance, as it houses the world-famous Burrell Collection in its grounds.
- Isle Tower

== Tartan ==
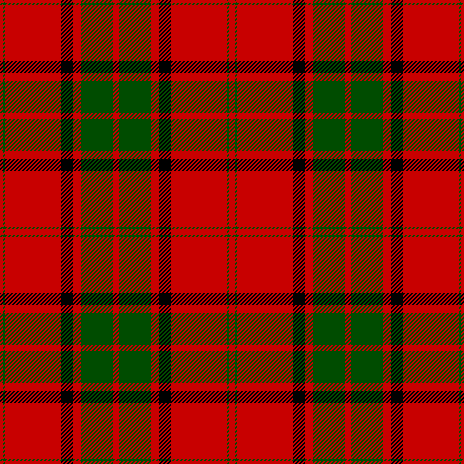
Maxwell tartan (modern dyes)
