= Maxwell baronets =

Set index for Maxwell baronets

There have been seven baronetcies created for persons with the surname Maxwell, six in the Baronetage of Nova Scotia, and one in the Baronetage of the United Kingdom.

- Maxwell baronets of Calderwood (1627): see Baron Farnham
- Maxwell baronets of Pollok (1630)
- Maxwell baronets of Orchardtoun (1663)
- Maxwell baronets of Monreith (1681)
- Maxwell baronets of Springkell (1683): see Heron-Maxwell Baronets
- Maxwell baronets of Pollock (1682/1707): see Maxwell Macdonald Baronets
- Maxwell baronets of Cardoness (1804)
