= Kirroughtree House =

Building in Dumfries and Galloway, Scotland

Coordinates: 54°57′50″N 4°27′58″W

Kirroughtree House is the heritage-listed mansion house (Category B listing.) of the Kirroughtree estate. It occupies a prominent position 1 mile (1.6 km) northeast of the town of Newton Stewart in the Galloway region of southwest Scotland. The main access is from the A712 close to its junction with the A75. Kirroughtree House was the family seat of the Heron family from the 14th or the 15th century until the 1880s. The mansion house is now a luxury hotel. While remnants of an older house have been found in a blocked-off cellar, the current house dates to 1719 with extensions to the northeast added in the 19th and early 20th century. The house has connections with both James Boswell and Robert Burns, each of whom stayed at Kirroughtree House as guests in the later 18th century.

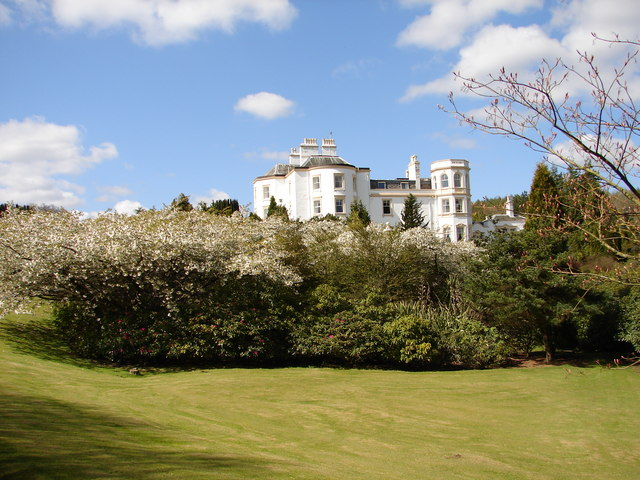
Kirroughtree House as it stands today

== The estate ==
During the heritorship of the Herons, the estate included Creebridge House and the Newton Stewart Golf Course to the west, and extended beyond Palnure. To the east, where the Forestry Commission's Kirroughtree Visitor Centre now stands, it included the lead mines of Blackcraig, which contributed to the estate's prosperity after their chance discovery during the construction of a military road in 1763. Kirroughtree House has retained 8 acres (3.2ha) of gardens incorporating a variety of well-grown trees that include North American species imported in the 18th century. The area behind the mansion house, where the ice house, the stables and the walled garden used to be located, has over time been turned into a secluded area of privately owned country cottages. The ice house is to be found incorporated into the garden wall of Ice House Cottage, and part of the wall to the original walled garden is still extant, while the dovecote, which was constructed around the same time as the main house, can be found on the golf course beyond.

== Origin ==
While there is no evidence of long-term Roman occupation in the area, an alliance of Romans and Picts reportedly fought a Scots army on the plain below where Kirroughtree House now stands. A tomb from the Roman period existed on the estate. It was uncovered in the 18th century when a mound was opened to get earth for tree-planting. Numerous urns and a skeleton were found in the tomb but were not preserved.

The name Kirroughtree, with a variety of spellings, was in use as the estate name in the Late Middle Ages, although its origin is a matter of conjecture. A popular explanation is that it derives from Caer Uchtred meaning fortress of Uchtred, one of the sons of Fergus of Galloway, but there is no evidence that Uchtred built a fortress in the area. It could, however, derive from a geographical description such as corrach-traigh "marsh at the river side" describing the lower part of the estate. A Battle of Kirroughtree took place in 1308 during the First War of Scottish Independence in which Edward Bruce put to flight a significantly larger English-led army.

== The Herons ==
When and how the Heron family, who also held land in Northumberland, came to be in possession of Kirroughtree is unclear. The estate may have been granted to them in the 14th century by King Robert the Bruce who rewarded his supporters this way following his final victory against the English at the Battle of Bannockburn, or it may have been granted to another family, either McLurg or McKie, and was obtained in the 15th century by the marriage of a Heron to an heiress of the original family when their own male line failed.

Early in the 17th century a land dispute occurred between Patrick Heron (c.1597–1666) of Kirroughtree and McLurg of Machirmore where McLurg ploughed a stretch of land that Heron then sowed corn into. Threats ensued, followed by litigation. While the disputing landholders were away at court in Edinburgh, the corn ripened and their wives had it cut down and fed it to the cattle of both properties, thus ending the dispute.

In 1683, following the Covenanter insurrection in Scotland, Patrick Heron's son Andrew Heron (c.1617–1695) was fined 5000 Scottish merks by the Privy Council of Scotland for "being at house and field conventicles, and intercommuning with, and resetting his son Patrick Heron a ring leader at (the battle of) Bothwell Bridge, and his son in law who had been likewise there". Andrew Heron was, however, allowed to keep both his life and his estate because, it seems, he had voluntarily admitted to the contact and pleaded ignorance of the law. Conventicles were held around a stone called the Preacher's Stone in a field to the northeast of Kirroughtree House. The persecutions of nonconformists during this period, called 'the Killing Time', may have been a reason why many of the Heron family emigrated to Ireland around this time.

== 18th century ==
The Revolution of 1688 ended the persecution of nonconformists and facilitated rising prosperity for the Heron family. The former fugitive and Bothwell "ring leader" Patrick Heron (1642–1721), accrued considerable wealth through raising cattle and exporting them to England. Each year from 1689 to 1691 it is recorded that he raised 1000 cattle in a park at Baldoon, south of Wigtown, and drove them to England via Dumfries for a handsome profit. After his father's 1695 death, Patrick Heron succeeded to Kirroughtree Estate and began to acquire additional land and enclose more parks for livestock, building dykes (dry stone walls) and planting trees around the landholdings. His prosperity enabled the building of the current Kirroughtree House and its dovecote, but his enclosures also contributed to the villagers of Minnigaff losing their access to fertile agricultural land and thus, after his death, to the Galloway Levellers uprising of 1724.

Patrick Heron's son, also named Patrick Heron (1672–1761), was instrumental in 1724 in the defusing of a tense situation during the uprising when the Levellers, men who were protesting against the use of enclosures by landowners like Heron (their name came from their practice of "levelling" the dykes that the landowners had erected), were confronted by a party of landowners. Heron convinced his fellow landowners that, as their numbers were less than the numbers of the Levellers, negotiation was a better strategy than force. Heron went to meet the Levellers, hat in hand, and proposed a conference. The conference enabled the Levellers to air their grievances, the landowners to deny those grievances and thus the status quo to be restored without violence. Following this, Heron was elected (by fellow landowners) to the House of Commons and was the Member for Kirkcudbright Stewartry from 1727 to 1741.

Patrick Heron (1736–1803) succeeded to his grandfather's estate in 1761. His social circles included Boswell and, later, Burns.

== Literary connections ==
James Boswell, diarist and biographer of Samuel Johnson, was a guest at Kirroughtree House in October 1762. Boswell described his host, young Patrick Heron, as "sensible, genteel, well-bred, has an uncommon good temper, and, at the same time, has all the spirit that becomes a man". Patrick married a cousin of James Boswell, Elizabeth Cochrane, in 1775 after divorcing his first wife, Jean Home, the daughter of Henry Home, Lord Kames, for adultery with a young officer. Jean Home may have had other affairs, including with Boswell himself, as Boswell wrote "I loved the daughter of a man of the first distinction in Scotland. She married a gentleman of great wealth. She allowed me to see that she love me more than she did her husband. She made no difficulty of granting me all.... She said, "I love my husband as a husband, and you as a lover, each in his own sphere.... Nature has so made me that I shall never bear children. No one suffers from our loves."".

Poet Robert Burns visited Kirroughtree House in the 1790s and is reputed to have recited his poetry sitting at the foot of the main staircase. Burns supported Patrick Heron's successful campaign to enter the House of Commons as the Member for Kirkcudbright Stewartry in 1795. He wrote the Heron Ballads in support of the "laird" of "Kirouchtree", describing Heron as "the independent patriot", "the honest man" and "an independent commoner" who "maun bear the gree" (must take the prize). Patrick did “bear the gree” to become the local Member, but after being elected for a second term in 1803, Heron was unseated by the decision of a parliamentary committee and died in Grantham whilst on his return journey to Scotland.

Burns additionally wrote a song, "Here is the Glen", to go with a tune, "The Banks o’ Cree", written by Lady Elizabeth Heron, second wife of Patrick Heron, whom Burns described as “a particular friend of mine”. Patrick Heron had an altar to Independence erected in Kirroughtree's grounds with an inscription written by Burns.

== 19th century to present ==
Heron's only child to survive to adulthood was his daughter Stuart Mary (1777–1856). She therefore inherited Kirroughtree along with her husband Sir John Shaw Maxwell, a British Army officer who then adopted the surname Heron-Maxwell. On Mary's death in 1856 Kirroughtree passed to their son Rev Michael Maxwell Heron (1809–1873) and thence to his son John Heron-Maxwell (1836–1899) who served as Member of Parliament for Kirkcudbright from 1880 to 1885.

During John Heron-Maxwell's parliamentary term, Kirroughtree House was disentailed from the family. Heron-Maxwell sold the estate to Major Arthur Armitage in 1889. The Armitage family owned the house and its gardens until the 1950s when it became a hotel.
