= Kirkcudbrightshire (disambiguation) =

Kirkcudbrightshire is a county in Scotland.

Kirkcudbrightshire can also refer to:

- Kirkcudbright Stewartry (UK Parliament constituency), also known as Kirkcudbrightshire
- Kirkcudbrightshire (Parliament of Scotland constituency)
