= Buittle Castle =

Castle in Galloway, Scotland

- Dumfries and Galloway in Scotland
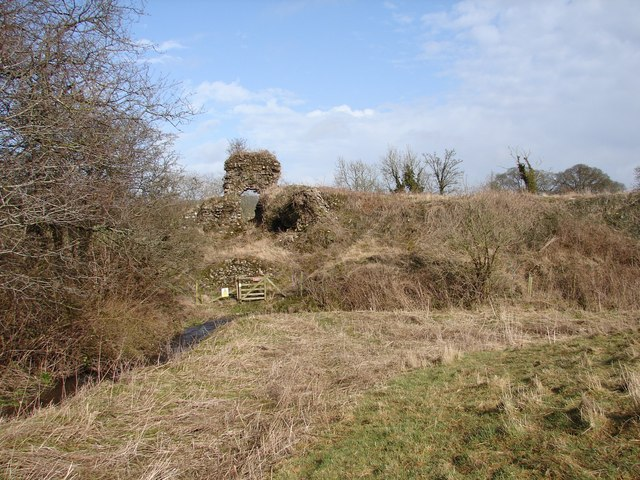
- Ruins of Buittle Castle

Site information
- Condition: Ruined

Location
- Coordinates: 54.935709°N 3.8452167°W

Site history
- Built: 12th century

Scheduled monument
- Official name: Buittle Castle
- Type: Secular: bailey; castle; motte
- Designated: 21 July 1937
- Reference no.: SM1115

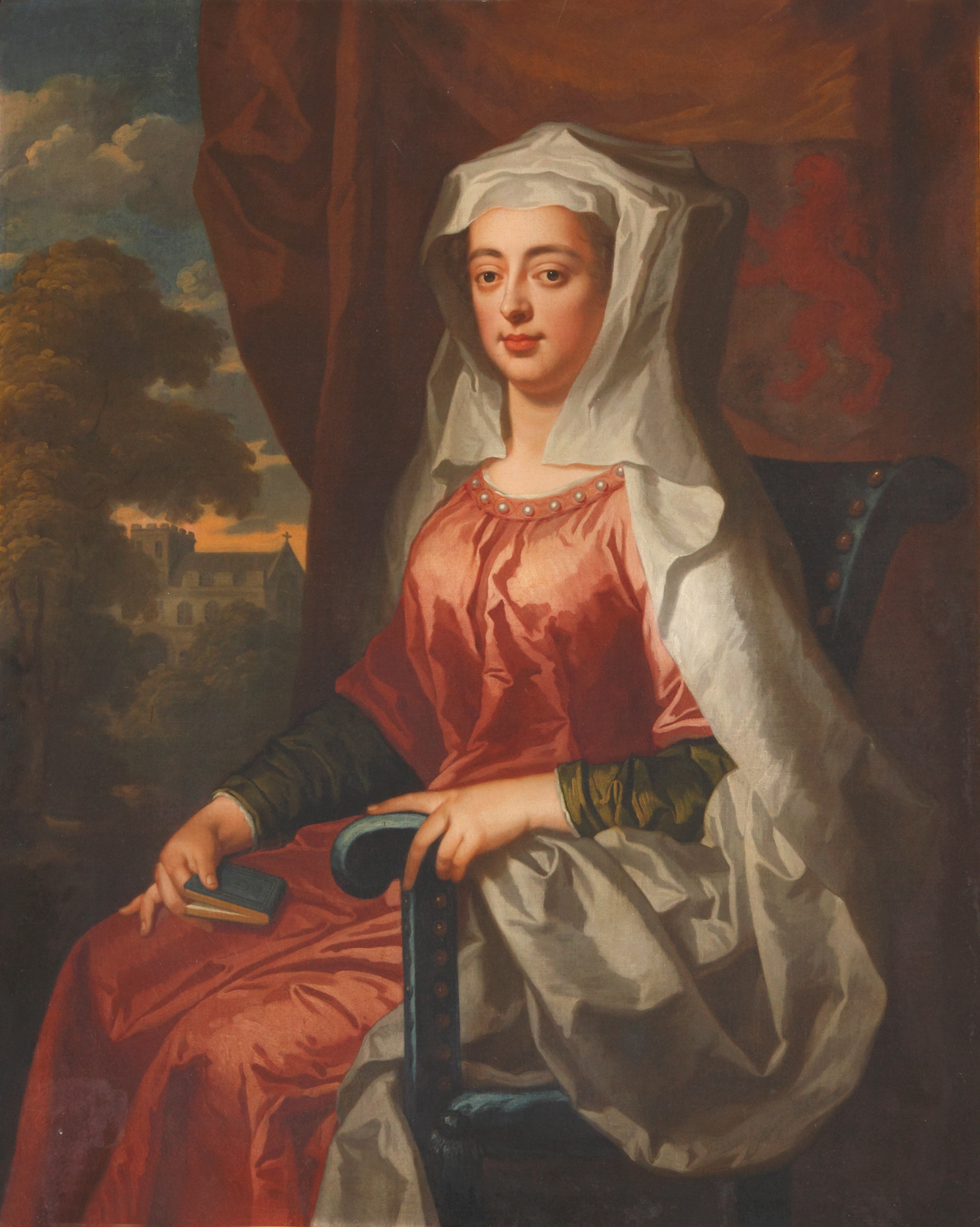
Dervorguilla of Galloway by Wilhelm Sonmans

Buittle Castle, also known historically as Botle or Botel Castle, is a Motte and Bailey site in Galloway, south-west Scotland with significant early and medieval history comprising a significant ruined Norman style Motte, and several extant buildings and gardens, including the later residential building in the form of the Tower House, on the historic Bailey. It is located in the valley of the River Urr, 1 kilometre (0.62 mi) west of Dalbeattie. The castle is within the parish of Buittle, in the traditional county of Kirkcudbrightshire and is a scheduled monument.

A motte and bailey castle was built either by Uchtred, Lord of Galloway or his son Roland, Lord of Galloway, in the 12th century. The castle passed by marriage to John de Balliol through the heiress of Alan, Lord of Galloway, Dervorguilla of Galloway, who built the Norman castle. Robert de Brus, 5th Lord of Annandale, captured the castle in 1286. The castle was in English hands in 1296. King Robert the Bruce captured the castle in 1308, and it was given to Sir James Douglas, Lord of Douglas.

The castle came into Edward Balliol's hands in 1332, before being given to Archibald the Grim, 3rd Earl of Douglas, in 1372. The castle remained in the hands of the Douglasses until 1456, when the castle reverted to the Crown. The castle was later in the hands of the Maxwells and briefly the Gordons of Lochinvar. The motte was slighted in 1595, leaving the remaining buildings of the bailey, which, it is believed, had already been taken on by this time as the primary residential buildings. This residential shift from the motte to the bailey of the castle began, in the first place, with the building of a Mansion House dated to 1347, likely affixed to the keep of the bailey, built by Edward Balliol, and latterly by the Tower House as the primary residential building of the castle. By this time in Scottish history, the tower house was the prevailing form of castle, or fortified building in Scotland.

The castle was in the ownership of the Maxwells of Buittle by the 16th century, but by the mid 18th century, probably due to a combination of Jacobite associations and changing fashion, the family had moved to Munches House, a Neo-Classical mansion a few miles to the west. It was at this time that the historic Motte and Bailey were put to agricultural use, and subsumed into the larger Munches Estate. Francis Grosse shows the Castle in a roofless state in 1798, with agricultural activities being undertaken in the buildings of the courtyard. The Munches Estate was divided and sold in the mid 20th century, but the ruins of the Motte were separately disponed from the bailey and remained in the possession of the Maxwells of Munches until 1984 when they were gifted to Balliol College, Oxford by Peter Maxwell QC of Munches himself a Balliol man.

== Early history ==
Between 1993 and 2000, significant archeological excavations were undertaken on the bailey of Buittle Castle, by A. Penman and E Cochrane. From these it has become apparent that the site has been occupied since at least the Mesolithic age, and also was subsequently occupied and, presumably, fortified by the Romans at this strategic point of crossing over the Water of Urr.

Amongst the finds were a proliferation of Neolithic, Bronze Age and Iron Age artefacts. The digs uncovered evidence of a permanent settlement during the Mesolithic era, temporary settlement during the Neolithic/Early Bronze Age, and permanent Iron Age/Romano-British occupation from the time of Agricola's invasion of Galloway in AD 82–84. An area of prehistoric pasture land has yielded a number of lithics, and there is post-hole and pottery evidence of an early roundhouse on this level.

Numerous prehistoric lithics and a small quantity of Roman and Romano-British pottery including sherds of amphora, a Romano-Celtic shrine, Romano-British pottery and a Roman bronze cavalry stud were also found.

== Medieval period ==
It appears that sometime around the turn of the 11th century the raised areas of ground were moated and a timber Motte and Bailey fortress was established. This complemented the existing Motte of Urr, further up the river. With the construction of this timber fortification and the large complex of buildings which sprung up around it, we see the proper beginnings of the Castle, which was to later be fortified in stone.

The stone fortifications ca. 1200 eventually comprised the residential Motte (some 100 x 150 feet), where the Lords of Galloway had their private chambers as well as the major reception rooms necessary for the running of a semi-sovereign demesne, the Inner Bailey with its two-storey Keep, Chapel of Ease, and associated buildings, and the Outer Bailey, likely comprising workshops and servants dwellings, stabling, etc. These eventually formed the primary seat of the Lords of Galloway, which Lordship was eventually settled on Devorguilla, as the sole surviving heiress of Alan of Galloway.

It is difficult to overstate Lady Devorguilla's influence during her lifetime, especially in her Lordship of Galloway which centred around her seat at Buittle. Her marriage to John de Balliol of Barnard Castle was a powerful alliance which only increased her status. In her own right she owned manors from France to Hitchin in Hertfordshire, and the coming together of the two great houses of Galloway and Balliol meant that the pair wielded an enormous amount of power. By all accounts, however, Devorguilla was noted for her piety and she and her husband ruled Galloway benevolently and with an eye to the public good. It was likely under her auspices that the Chapel of Ease, now no longer extant, was built at Buittle, and it must be either this establishment or her promulgation of the Statutes of Balliol College, annotated 'apud Botel', which is connected to the discovery of a Papal Bulla of Honorius IV during the excavations on the bailey.

Although King John did try to rule in the example of his parents, his attempts to summon parliaments, and to put down lawlessness were not enough to stave off accusations of ceding too much power to King Edward of England, to whom he was greatly indebted for support during the Great Cause. When he was forced to rebel against English control of Scotland, his followers were roundly defeated by the English at the Battle of Dunbar (1296) after which he was stripped of the crown of Scotland by Edward I and became a prisoner of the English, never returning to Buittle Castle. The castle eventually fell to Robert the Bruce's forces in February 1313, under the command of his brother Edward Bruce. King Robert retained possession of Buittle until finally granting it to Sir James Douglas, Lord of Douglas. The Douglases retained possession until Edward Balliol, King John's son, was crowned in 1332 in his attempt to overthrow King Robert the Bruce's son, King David II, but his attempt failed miserably. The new Lord of Douglas, Sir William, later Earl of Douglas, recaptured Buittle Castle for King David in 1352 and it once more reverted to the Douglases.

Edward built a stone and timber-framed Mansion House on the Bailey in preference to the Motte. It is likely at this time that the fortified, or Barmkin, Courtyard would have been established which is today attached to the Tower House, thereby making a more easily defended central nucleus of buildings. If Edward's father could have been said to be a failed King of Scots, he was nothing compared to Edward himself, who ceded the whole of Lothian to Edward III, King of England in thanks for his support in retaking the throne. In 1356, after a series of astonishing setbacks, he surrendered his claim to the Scottish Throne, and died in Doncaster a year later.

In 1456, Buittle reverted to the Crown, as part of the James, 9th Earl of Douglas's forfeiture. It would seem that, at this time, James III of Scotland settled the Barony of Buittle on his Queen, Margaret of Denmark, as part of her dowry. Some time after, it was granted to the Maxwells, in whose hands it remained for the next 450 years.

== Georgian to 20th century - farming period ==
William, 15th Lord Maxwell, who, after his father's death, was affectionately called the 6th Earl of Nithsdale by the people of Galloway, participated in the Jacobite Rising of 1745, but, apart from suffering the indignities imposed on all Jacobite supporters, seems to have come away from the affair relatively unscathed. Like all Jacobites, he was no longer legally permitted to make repairs to fortified buildings. It is likely that, at this time, he closed the tower of Buittle Castle and unroofed it for tax purposes, putting the courtyard's other buildings to agricultural use. Munches House, a new mansion in the Neo-Classical Robert Adam style, became the seat of the Maxwells of Munches, Terraughty, and Buittle, a subsidiary line of the Lord's of Maxwell. Buittle, therefore, passed through this Maxwell line, but, with the more fashionable house at Munches as the seat of the consolidated estate. It was not until ca. 1820 that Buittle was re-roofed and inhabited by tenant farmers. The most famous of these late 18th-century Maxwells was John Maxwell of Terraughty, born at Buittle, and presumably the last resident of the castle before the move to Munches. He was immortalised in Robert Burns's birthday epistle to him, which begins: ‘Health to the Maxwell's veteran Chief! Health, aye unsour'd by care or grief: Inspired I turn'd Fate's sibyl leaf This natal morn; I see thy life is stuff o’ prief, Scarce quite half-worn.’

In 1949, Desmond Herries-Maxwell disponed the lands of Buittle to smallholding dairy farmers the Barrowmans. Desmond Maxwell, and latterly his son Peter Maxwell, Lord Maxwell QC however, retained portions of the estate. In 1984, Lord Maxwell bequeathed the ruins of the ancient Motte unto ‘The Master and Scholars of Balliol College’. This historic conveyance marked the 720th anniversary of the founding of Balliol.

== Restoration and present day ==
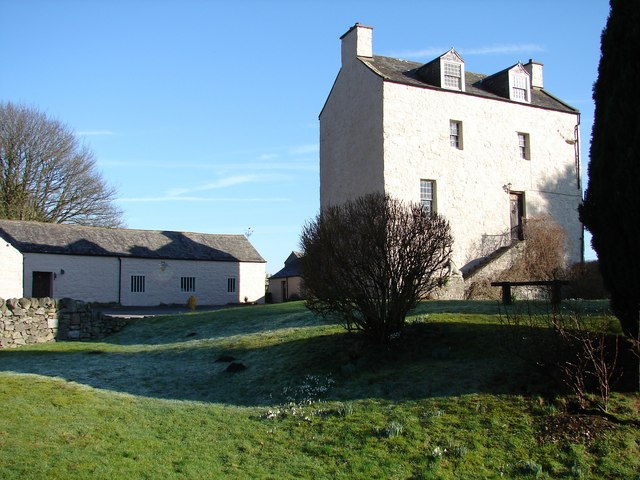
Old Place of Buittle

The current buildings, known during the farming period as Old Place of Buittle or Buittle Place comprise the Barmkin Courtyard with its main building - a largely 16th century Tower House, as well as a printing workshop and other outbuildings in the grounds of the bailey. It would seem that the tower house with courtyard complex had become known as Buittle Castle at least until the buildings were given over to agricultural use in the 18th century, as witnessed by Grose, Cardonnel, MacGibbon and Ross, et al. By about 1790 the tower was roofless but in the mid-nineteenth century it was re-roofed to serve as accommodation for farm workers when it became part of the neighbouring Munches estate, during which time the bartizan angle turrets were removed. The buildings, therefore, provided a challenge for restoration as significant farm buildings and arrangements had been erected during this period, as well as significant historical features removed.

The site was sold in 1992 to Jeffrey Burn, an artist, historian and re-enactor, who started the restoration of the historic buildings, largely stripping away the alterations and accretions of the farming period. Burn renamed the buildings 'Old Buittle Tower', seemingly the first time that this name was used in connection to the property. The current owners have reverted to the name used by Grose and Cardonnel of Buittle Castle, reflecting the continued occupation and history of the comprehensive site. This courtyard of the current castle contains the Talla-bìdh Tea Room, the Laigh or Great Hall, and B&B accommodation. In the vaulted undercroft of the tower is a chapel which regularly offers liturgical services according to the medieval Use of Sarum. The grounds contain a variety of garden areas designed and installed to highlight periods in the site's history, including a sunken garden designed on 15th century models by Anne Jennings. The property comprising the bailey of Buittle Castle is now used as a private residence, B&B, and religious site. The ruinous Motte of the Motte and Bailey site remains in the possession of Balliol College, Oxford, and is positioned to the immediate east of the Bailey.
