= Dalbeattie Town Hall =

Municipal building in Dalbeattie, Scotland

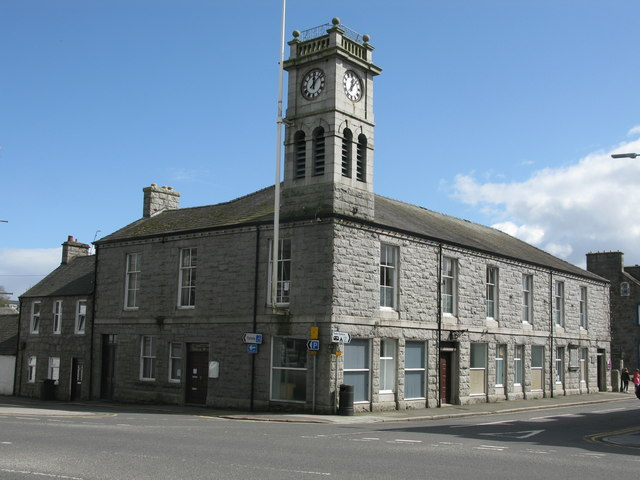
- Dalbeattie Town Hall

- Shown in Dumfries and Galloway
- 54.9333°N 3.8225°W
- Location: High Street, Dalbeattie

History
- Built: 1862

Site notes
- Architectural style: Italianate style

Listed Building – Category B
- Official name: 1–11 (Odd Numbers) High Street, Dalbeattie Town Hall and 4, Water Street
- Designated: 4 November 1971
- Reference no.: LB24310

Dalbeattie Town Hall is a municipal building in the High Street in Dalbeattie, Dumfries and Galloway, Scotland. The structure, which is used as community events venue, is a Category B listed building.

== History ==
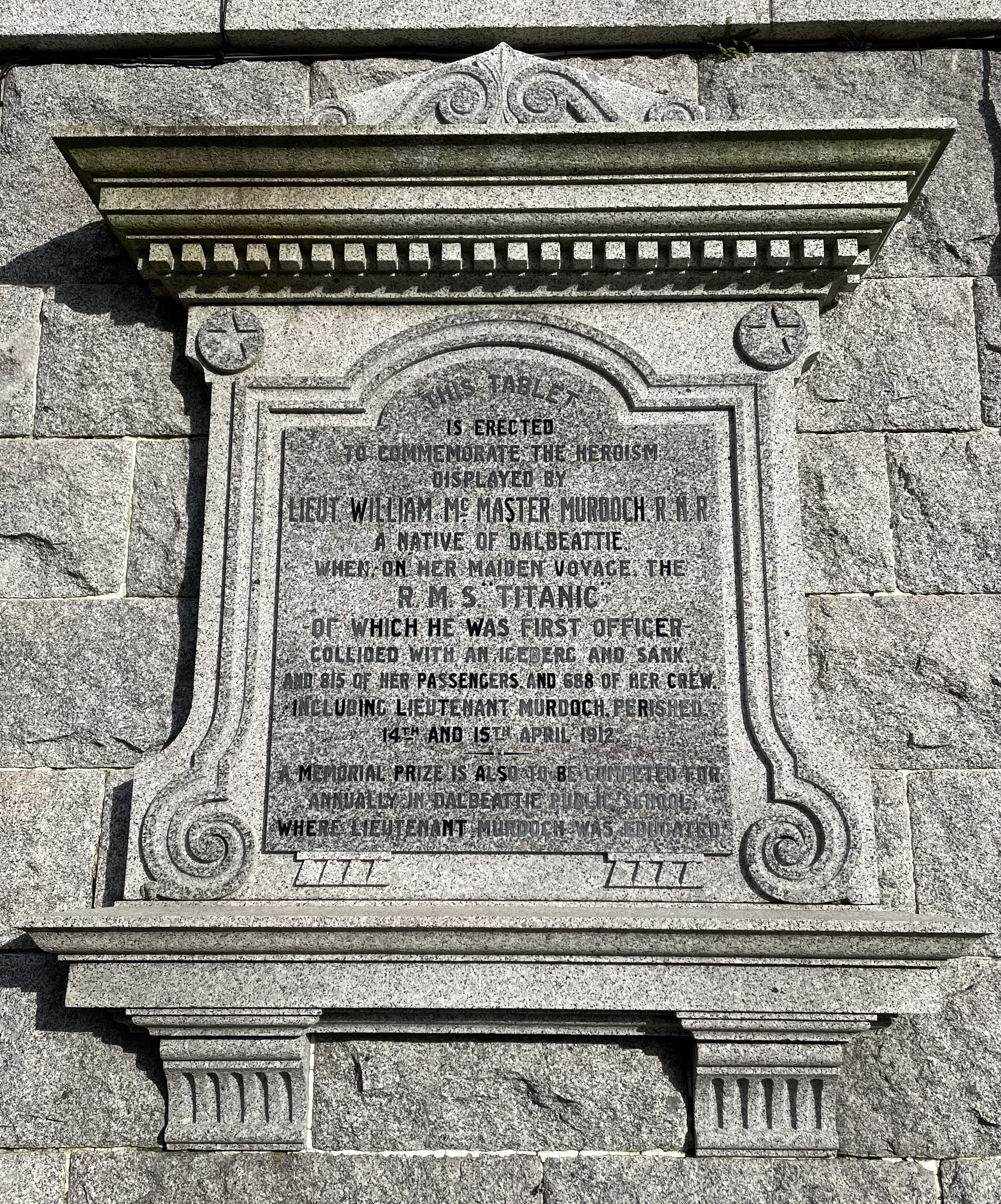
The plaque commemorating the life of William McMaster Murdoch, First officer of the RMS Titanic

After Dalbeattie became a police burgh in 1858, the new burgh leaders decided to commission a town hall. The new building was designed in a plain neoclassical style, built in local granite and was completed in 1862. The design involved a two-storey rectangular structure on the corner of Water Street and the High Street with three bays along Water Street and six bays along the High Street. The ground floor was originally occupied by a series of shops, while the first floor was fenestrated by a series of sash windows. Internally, the principal room was the main assembly hall.

In May 1862, Captain William Wilson, who had been born nearby in Colvend, was guest of honour in the town hall when he regaled his story of how, while in command of the merchant ship, Emily St. Pierre, he had been arrested by the captain of the Union Navy steamship, James Adger, for blockade running in the harbour at Charleston, South Carolina during the American Civil War. With the aid of just two other seamen, he had overpowered his captors and had sailed his ship back to Liverpool, much to the embarrassment of the U. S. Government.

A four-stage clock tower, designed by Alan Burgess Crombie in the Italianate style, was erected at the western corner of the building in the early 1890s: following its completion, the building was officially re-opened by the local member of parliament, William Maxwell, on 16 November 1894. The tower featured a belfry with louvres in the third stage and clock faces in the fourth stage, and was surmounted by a balustraded parapet with ball finials at the corners.

Following the sinking of the RMS Titanic on its maiden voyage in April 1912, a public meeting was convened in the town hall under the chairmanship of the provost, Dugald McLaurin, in August 1912. At the meeting, it was agreed to commission a memorial plaque to commemorate the life of William McMaster Murdoch, who had been born and raised in Dalbeattie and had been serving as First Officer of the ship at the time of its sinking. The plaque was duly engraved and installed on the southwest face of the town hall later that year.

The town hall continued to serve as the meeting place of the burgh council for much of the 20th century but ceased to be the local seat of government when the enlarged Stewartry District Council was formed in 1975. However, the building continued to be used for meetings of the Dalbeattie Community Council and for local community events. Another plaque was installed on the southwest face of the town hall to celebrate the bicentenary of the founding of the town in 1981.

== See also ==
- List of listed buildings in Dalbeattie, Dumfries and Galloway
