= Thomas Maitland =

Thomas Maitland may refer to:

- Thomas Maitland, Lord Dundrennan (1792–1851), Scottish judge
- Thomas Maitland (British Army officer) (1760–1824), British general
- Thomas Maitland, 11th Earl of Lauderdale (1803–1878), Royal Navy officer and peer
