= List of listed buildings in Dalbeattie, Dumfries and Galloway =

This is a list of listed buildings in the town of Dalbeattie, in the parish of Urr in Dumfries and Galloway, Scotland.

== List ==
Name	Location	Date Listed	Grid Ref. (Note: Sometimes known as OSGB36, the grid reference (where provided) is based on the British national grid reference system used by the Ordnance Survey. • "Guide to National Grid". Ordnance Survey. • "Get-a-map". Ordnance Survey.)	Geo-coordinates	Notes	LB Number (Note: Historic Environment Scotland assign a unique alphanumeric identifier to each designated site in Scotland, for listed buildings this always begins with "LB", for example "LB12345".)	Image
1-12 (Inclusive Nos) Craignair Road				54°55′52″N 3°49′37″W	Category C(S)	24306	Upload Photo
Craignair Road, St Peter's Roman Catholic Church, Boundary Railings And Gatepiers				54°55′57″N 3°49′34″W	Category B	24309	Upload Photo
83-91 (Odd Nos) High Street And Flank To Southwick Road				54°55′52″N 3°49′12″W	Category B	24311	Upload Photo
5 John Street, Colliston Boys Club Hall (Former Uf Church)				54°56′03″N 3°49′22″W	Category C(S)	24313	Upload Photo
Maxwell Road, The Maxwell Arms And Annexe				54°55′59″N 3°49′23″W	Category C(S)	24315	Upload Photo
Mill Street, Dalbeattie Park Church, (Church Of Scotland) Gatepiers, Gates And Boundary Walls				54°56′00″N 3°49′14″W	Category B	24317	Upload Photo
Craignair Road Craignair Church, (Church Of Scotland) Boundary Walls, Gatepiers And Gates				54°55′51″N 3°49′35″W	Category B	24307	Upload Photo
1 John Street, Bank Of Scotland				54°56′01″N 3°49′23″W	Category C(S)	24312	Upload Photo
17 Mill Street; Alma House, And Gatepiers				54°55′58″N 3°49′15″W	Category B	24316	Upload Photo
Colliston Park Bandstand				54°56′06″N 3°49′12″W	Category B	24305	Upload Photo
Craignair Road, Newton House, And Boundary Railings				54°55′52″N 3°49′34″W	Category C(S)	24308	Upload Photo
1-11 (Odd Nos), High Street, Dalbeattie Town Hall And 4 Water Street				54°56′00″N 3°49′21″W	Category B	24310	Upload another image
John Street, Water Street, The Round House				54°56′01″N 3°49′21″W	Category C(S)	24314	Upload Photo
5 Station Road				54°56′02″N 3°49′26″W	Category C(S)	24318	Upload Photo
32 Southwick Road, Cherrybank House And Retaining Walls To Southwick Road				54°55′55″N 3°49′07″W	Category C(S)	24320	Upload Photo

== Key ==
The scheme for classifying buildings in Scotland is:

- Category A: "buildings of national or international importance, either architectural or historic; or fine, little-altered examples of some particular period, style or building type."
- Category B: "buildings of regional or more than local importance; or major examples of some particular period, style or building type, which may have been altered."
- Category C: "buildings of local importance; lesser examples of any period, style, or building type, as originally constructed or moderately altered; and simple traditional buildings which group well with other listed buildings."

In March 2016 there were 47,288 listed buildings in Scotland. Of these, 8% were Category A, and 50% were Category B, with the remaining 42% being Category C.
