= Spencer-Smith baronets =

Baronetcy in the Baronetage of the United Kingdom

Escutcheon of the Smith baronets of Tring Park

The Smith, later Hamilton-Spencer-Smith, later Spencer-Smith Baronetcy, of Tring Park in the County of Hertford, is a title in the Baronetage of the United Kingdom. It was created on 11 June 1804 for Drummond Smith, with remainder to the heirs male of his niece Augusta (daughter of his eldest brother Joshua Smith, of Stoke Park, Wiltshire), wife of Charles Smith, MP, of Suttons, Essex. The latter was a descendant of Robert Smith, of Ilminster, from whom the Smith-Marriott baronets are also descended. The fifth Baronet (whose father Reverend Spencer Compton Hamilton-Spencer-Smith had assumed the additional surnames of Hamilton and Spencer in 1872, having married Mary, daughter of Admiral Cospatric Baillie-Hamilton, a descendant of Thomas Hamilton, 6th Earl of Haddington), was a member of the Military Inter-Allied Commission of Control from 1920 to 1924. The sixth Baronet discontinued the use of the surname of Hamilton.

Tring Park was acquired by the first Baronet in 1786. It was sold in 1823.

== Smith, later Hamilton-Spencer-Smith, later Spencer-Smith baronets, of Tring Park (1804) ==
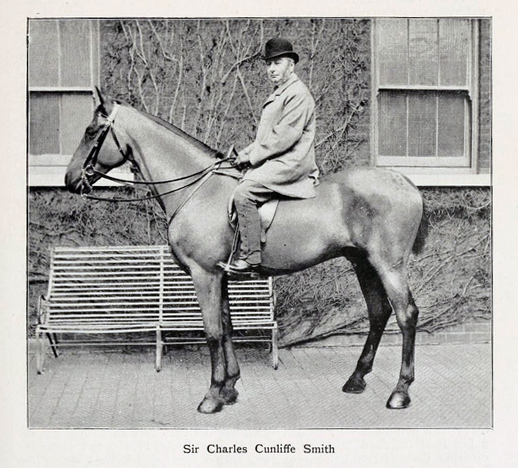
Sir Charles Cunliffe Smith, 3rd Baronet

- Sir Drummond Smith, 1st Baronet (1740–1816)
- Sir Charles Joshua Smith, 2nd Baronet (1800–1831)
- Sir Charles Cunliffe Smith, 3rd Baronet (1827–1905)
- Sir Drummond Cunliffe Smith, 4th Baronet (1861–1947)
- Sir Drummond Cospatric Hamilton-Spencer-Smith, 5th Baronet (1876–1955)
- Sir Thomas Cospatric Hamilton Spencer-Smith, 6th Baronet (1917–1959)
- Sir John Hamilton Spencer-Smith, 7th Baronet (born 1947)

The heir presumptive to the baronetcy is Michael Philip Hamilton-Spencer-Smith (born 1952).

== Notes ==
Baronetage of the United Kingdom
Preceded by Maxwell baronets	Spencer-Smith baronets of Tring Park; 11 June 1804	Succeeded by Walsh baronets
