= John Maitland (Kirkcudbright MP) =

John Maitland MP

Member of Parliament for Kirkcudbright Stewartry
- In office 31 January 1874 – 31 March 1880
- Preceded by: Wellwood Herries Maxwell
- Succeeded by: John Heron-Maxwell

Personal details
- Born: 1841
- Died: February 1922 (aged 80)
- Party: Liberal

John Maitland (1841 – February 1922) was a Liberal Party politician.

He was elected Liberal MP for Kirkcudbright Stewartry in 1874 but stood down at the next election in 1880.

Parliament of the United Kingdom
Preceded by Wellwood Herries Maxwell	Member of Parliament for Kirkcudbright Stewartry; 1874 – 1880	Succeeded by John Heron-Maxwell
