= 1868 Kirkcudbrightshire by-election =

UK parliamentary by-election

The 1868 Kirkcudbrightshire by-election was an uncontested election held on 30 January 1868. The by-election was brought about due to the death of the incumbent Liberal MP, James Mackie. It was won by the Liberal candidate Wellwood Herries Maxwell, who stood unopposed.
