= Alexander Murray (1789–1845) =

Alexander Murray (1789 – 15 July 1845) of Broughton was a Scottish Liberal Party politician who sat in the House of Commons of the United Kingdom from 1838 to 1845.

At the 1837 general election Murray unsuccessfully contested Wigtownshire, where was defeated by the Conservative Party candidate James Blair. He was elected unopposed at a by-election in 1838 as the Member of Parliament (MP) for Kirkcudbright Stewartry, filling the vacancy caused the death of Robert Cutlar Fergusson.

Murray was re-elected in 1841 with more than twice the votes of his lone opponent, the Conservative W. Maxwell.

He held the seat until his death 4 years later, aged about 56. He died in the south of Ireland on 15 July 1845, having been suddenly taken ill two days earlier.

Parliament of the United Kingdom
Preceded by Robert Cutlar Fergusson	Member of Parliament for Kirkcudbright Stewartry; 1838 – 1845	Succeeded by Thomas Maitland
