= Maxwells of Munches =

Scottish family

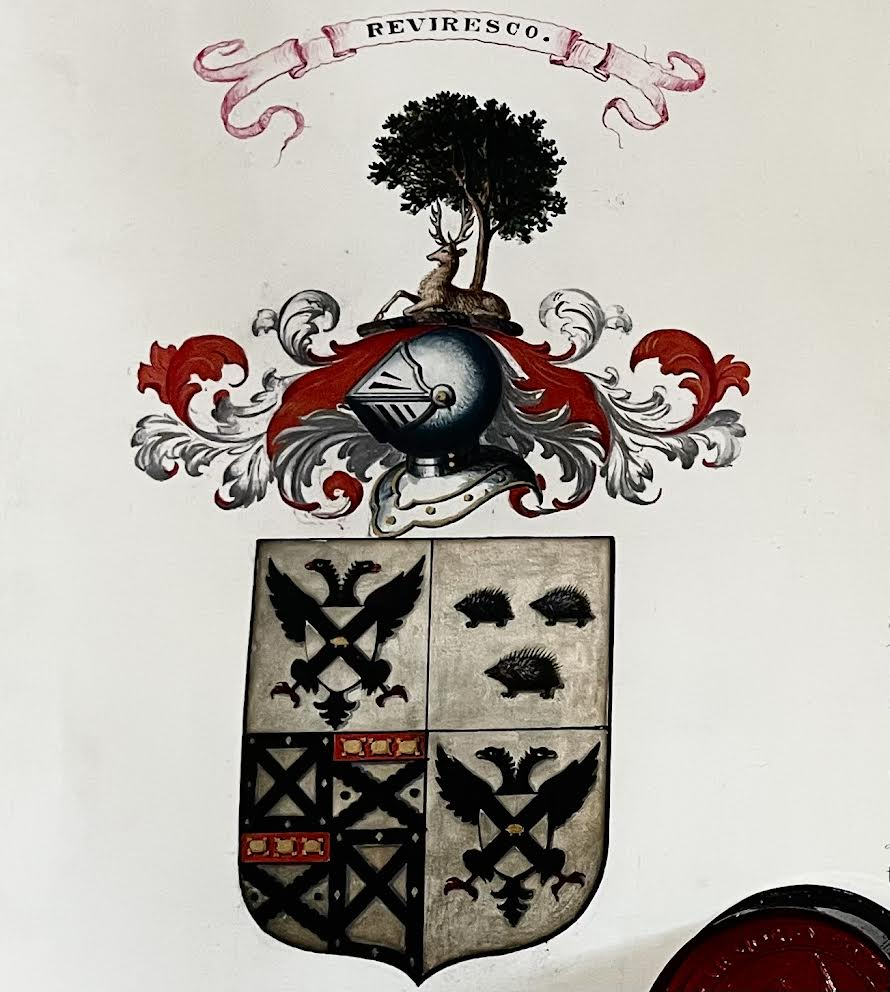
Armorial Bearings (coat of arms) of the Maxwells of Munches

The Maxwells of Munches (Munchies or Munshes) previously styled the Maxwells of Terraughty, represent an old aristocratic and armigerous Scottish family with deep roots in the country's history (named after their estate 'Munches'). Historically, members of the Terraughty–Munches line were recognized as the heir-male representatives of the Earls of Nithsdale the hereditary chiefs of the larger Maxwell Clan; and as they are now considered the heirs of line of the clan, they continue to occupy a senior position within the clan hierarchy. Through strategic marriages and the extinction of several collateral Maxwell lines, the Munches family became associated with, or represent the surviving line of, the Maxwells of Barncleugh, the Maxwells of Breconside, the Maxwells of Arkland, and the Maxwells of Buittle. The current head of the family is Desmond Maxwell.

== Origins and heritage ==
The Munches line originates with James Maxwell of Breconside of Kirkgunzeon (1607–1659), the second son of John Maxwell, 6th Lord Herries of Terregles, and grandson of the old Maxwell Lords of Caerlaverock. This descent places the family within one of the most senior male-line branches of the historic Maxwell kindred. James’s descendant John Maxwell, 3rd of Breconside and of Terraughty (1670–1724) consolidated the family’s holdings, and was succeeded by his son William Maxwell, 4th of Breconside and Terraughty (d. 1756), whose line formed the basis of the later Munches succession.

William Maxwell was succeeded by his son John Maxwell of Portrack, Terraughty, Munches and Dinwoodie (1720–1814), who acquired the estates of Munches and Dinwoodie through his second wife Agnes Maxwell of Munches. He was formally served heir-male to Robert Maxwell, 4th Earl of Nithsdale, on 4 June 1778, recognising him as the chief surviving male representative of the ancient Maxwell chief’s line. His son, Alexander Herries Maxwell of Munches and Terraughty (1735–1815), continued this male representation, but died without issue.

Under the 1813 Disposition and Deed of Entail, the estates of Munches, Terraughty and Dinwoodie passed to his niece Clementina Herries Maxwell (1782–1858), eldest daughter of William Maxwell, second son of John Maxwell of Terraughty and Munches, and of Janet Syme of Barncailzie. Clementina succeeded as 7th of Munches upon Alexander’s death in 1815.

Her marriage in 1813 to her first cousin John Herries Maxwell of Barncleugh, (1784–1843) united the Terraughty–Munches succession with the Barncleugh branch. John Herries Maxwell was the eldest surviving son of Wellwood Maxwell of Barncleugh (formerly Wellwood Johnstone) and Catherine Maxwell, daughter of John Maxwell of Terraughty and Munches, thereby reinforcing the connection between all three Maxwell cadet houses.

Clementina and John Herries Maxwell’s son, Wellwood Herries Maxwell of Munches MP (1817–1900), succeeded as 8th of Munches. In 1868 he re-matriculated the family arms in the Public Register, quartering the heraldry of Maxwell, Herries, Maxwell of Barncleugh, and Johnstone of Clauchrie, in accordance with the Deed of Entail and the combined genealogy of the house. He was succeeded by his son William Jardine Herries Maxwell, 9th of Munches (1852–1933).

== Heraldry ==
In the extract of Matriculation obtained by Wellwood Herries Maxwell of Munches, it declares that the whole heirs of entail and the substitutes and the husbands of the female heirs shall be bound on the succession opening to them respectively to assume, use and constantly retain the surnames and arms of Herries and Maxwell and the designation of Herries and Maxwell of Munches in all time after their succession to obtaining possession of the said land and estate as their proper surnames, arms and designation.

The armorial bearings held by the head of the family are as follows.

Vizt Quarterly, first and fourth grand quarters, argent, an eagle displayed with two heads sable beaked and membered gules, bearing on his breast an escutcheon of the first charged with a Saltire of the second surcharged with an urcheon or, for Maxwell; second grand Quarter, argent, three urcheons sable, for Herries; Third Grand Quarter, counter quartered first and fourth, argent, a saltire sable, on a bordure of the second eight lozenges of the first, for Maxwell of Barncleugh, second and third, argent, a saltire invecked sable between two pellets in flank, on a chief gules three cushions or, for Johnstone of Blauchrie. Above the Shield is placed a helmet befitting his degree, with a mantling gules doubled argent, and on a wreath of his liveries is set for crest, a stag lodged in front of a holly tree proper, and in an escrol over the same this Motto, "Reviresco".

Matriculated the twenty eighth day of April 1868 by Wellwood Herries Maxwell.

== Estates and land ==
The Maxwells of Munches were historically associated with the Estates of Munches and various other lands. These properties, once held by the family, played a significant role in their social standing and influence. The family has since lost ownership of these lands and estates having to sell them off due to financial instability

Lands and estates once owned by the family include: Breconside, Dinwoodie, Munches, Buittle and Buittle Castle, Terraughty, Dalbeattie, Portrack and Barnlceuch.

== Notable figures ==
- Wellwood Herries Maxwell MP
- Peter Maxwell, Lord Maxwell
- William Jardine Herries Maxwell
- Charles William Maxwell
- John Maxwell of Terraughty and Munches
