= Robert Cutlar Fergusson =

Scottish lawyer and politician

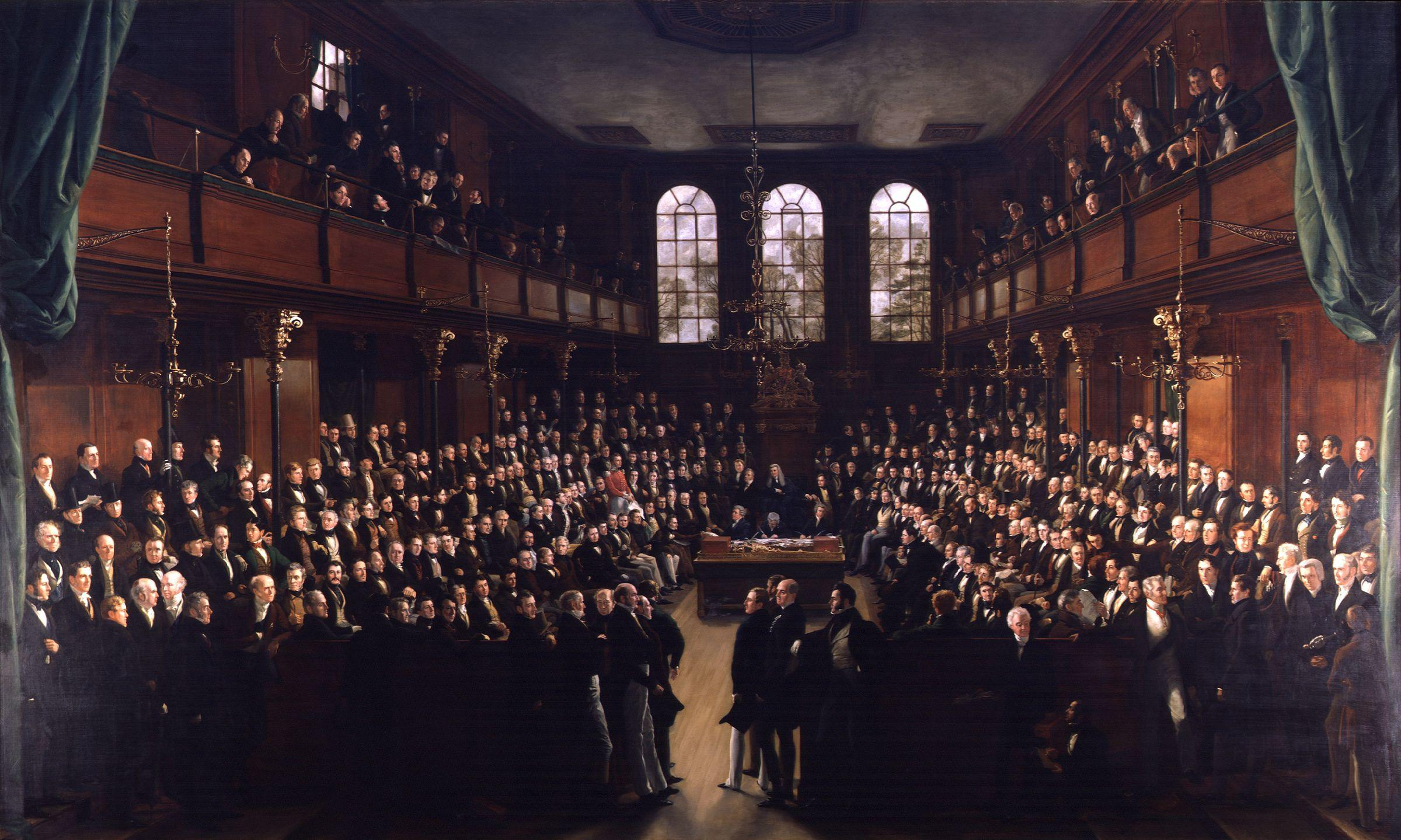

Robert Cutlar Fergusson (1768–1838) was a Scottish lawyer and politician. He was 17th Laird of the Dumfriesshire Fergussons, seated at Craigdarroch (Moniaive, Dumfriesshire).

== Life ==
Robert Fergusson was born in Dumfries, the eldest son of Alexander Fergusson, Esq., of Craigdarroch and Orraland House, Kirkcudbrightshire, who was an eminent advocate. His great-grandfather was Alexander Fergusson, the husband of Annie Laurie of folksong fame. He was educated at Edinburgh and studied law at Lincoln's Inn, being called to the bar in 1797.

He was gaoled for a year in the King's Bench prison in the late 1790s for being associated with Arthur O'Connor and Father James Coigly, United Irishmen who, with radical circles in Britain and with the French Directory, were trying to coordinate a republican insurrection in Ireland. On his release he decided it would be wise to leave the country and therefore moved to India where he worked as a barrister for some 30 years in the Supreme Court of Judicature at Calcutta. He was made acting Advocate-General of Bengal in 1817 when Edward Strettell left for England due to ill-health, holding the post until Robert Spankie arrived as Strettell's successor. When Spankie returned to England in 1823, Fergusson succeeded him as Advocate-General.

On his return to Britain he was elected MP for the Stewardtry of Kirkcudbright in 1826, sitting until 1838. He was appointed a Privy Councillor in 1834 and Judge Advocate General from 1835 to 1838.

Dwarkanath Tagore, the great Bengal entrepreneur, was apprenticed under him in 1810, and Fergusson was one of the two leading influences in his life.

Parliament of the United Kingdom
Preceded by James Dunlop	Member of Parliament for Kirkcudbright Stewartry; 1826 – 1838	Succeeded by Alexander Murray
