= John Heron-Maxwell =

Scottish politician

John Maxwell Heron-Maxwell (5 September 1836 – 26 January 1899) was a Scottish Liberal Party politician who sat in the House of Commons from 1880 to 1885.

Heron-Maxwell was the son of Rev Michael Heron-Maxwell of Heron and Kirroughtree, and his wife Charlotte Frances Burgoyne, eldest daughter of Captain Frederick William Burgoyne RN. He was educated at Harrow School and joined the 1st Royal Scots Regiment, where he was a captain. He was a J.P. and deputy lieutenant for Kirkcudbrightshire and Wigtown.

At the 1880 general election Heron-Maxwell was elected Member of Parliament (MP) for Kirkcudbright. He held the seat until 1885.

Heron-Maxwell was the last member of the Heron family to inherit the family seat of Kirroughtree House. In 1889 it was sold to Major Arthur Armitage and is now a hotel.

== Personal life/death ==
Heron-Maxwell married Marguerite Stancomb, daughter of William Stancomb of Blount's Court, Wiltshire in 1868. Heron-Maxwell died at the age of 62.

Parliament of the United Kingdom
Preceded by John Maitland	Member of Parliament for Kirkcudbright; 1880 – 1885	Succeeded by Mark McTaggart-Stewart
