= Clan Heron =

Lowland Scottish clan

- Motto: Par Valeur (By Bravery)

Profile
- Region: Borders
- District: Galloway, Berwick Northumberland
- Pipe music: Here is the Glen
- Clan Heron no longer has a chief, and is an armigerous clan
- Historic seat: Heron, Kirkcudbrightshire
Allied clans
Clan Maxwell
Clan Douglas
Rival clans
Clan Kerr
Clan Tait

The Clan Heron was a lowland Scottish clan. One branch of the clan were border reivers who made a living by rustling cattle along the Anglo-Scottish border. Another branch were a landed family with their seat in Kirkcudbright.

== Origins of the clan ==
The clan claims descent from the Herons of Chipchase Castle in Northumberland, in the English Middle-march. In a survey made of the Border in 1522, it was reported that: "Chipchase was the most convenient house for the keeper of Tynedale" and the Herons were described as "A hot tempered race, regularly in trouble with the authorities". It is known that they had feuds with Clan Tate and Clan Kerr.

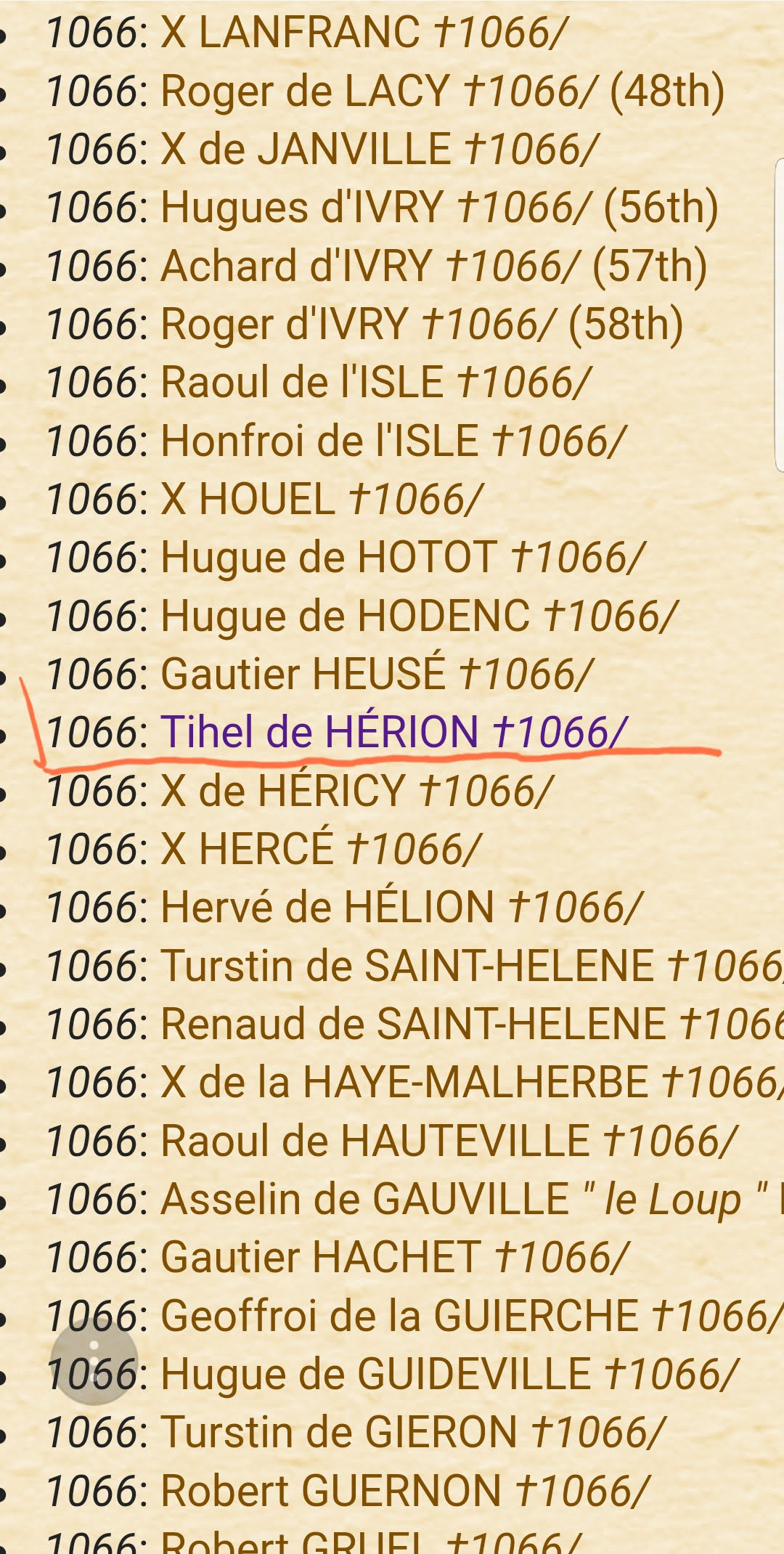

The name Heron is from the name de Herion, a habitational name from Heron near Rouen in Normandy. The progenitor of the clan, Tihel de Herion, was a Norman who arrived in England with William the Conqueror in 1066 and is found on the Battle Abbey Roll and the Falaise Roll. His name is on the stone plaque at dive-sur-mer and inscripted "Tihel de Hérion" He was granted land in Essex and his descendants spread to Northumberland, Hertfordshire, Scotland and Ireland. He also left descendants in France before residing in England.

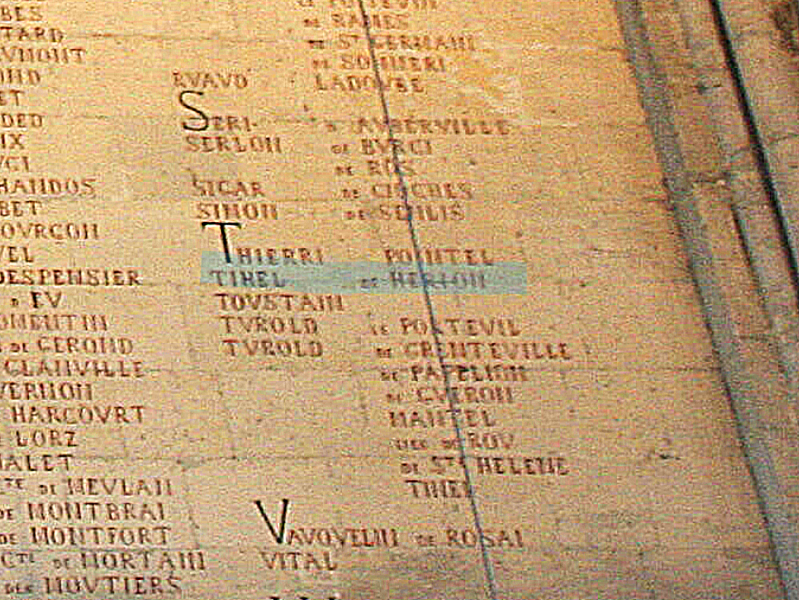

== History ==
The Clan Heron was one of the lesser Border reiving clans, a people who practised raiding and cattle rustling along the Anglo-Scottish border. However one of the clan's branches were a landed family with their seat in Kirkcudbrightshire.

Members of the clan held many positions of power on the borders and throughout Scotland and England. Walter Heron was the clerk to William the Lion. William Heron was the keeper of Bamburgh Castle in 1248; the keeper of Scarborough Castle in 1255; and the Sheriff of Northumberland between 1246 and 1247. Chipchase Castle in the English Middle-march was held by the Heron family for almost 300 years. The Herons also owned Ford Castle in Northumberland. In 1300, Gerald Heron fought on the side of Robert the Bruce, and he was awarded the rich lands of Kirroughtree where a branch of the clan resided for 400 years. The clan was in possession of Kirroughtree until 1889 (when John Heron-Maxwell sold Kirroughtree to Major Arthur Armitage.) A border lord, Sir Gerard Heron, put one thousand men in the saddle to attack William Wallace after he captured Kinclaven Castle. Roger Heron was a charter witness in 1321 in Langton, Berwick.

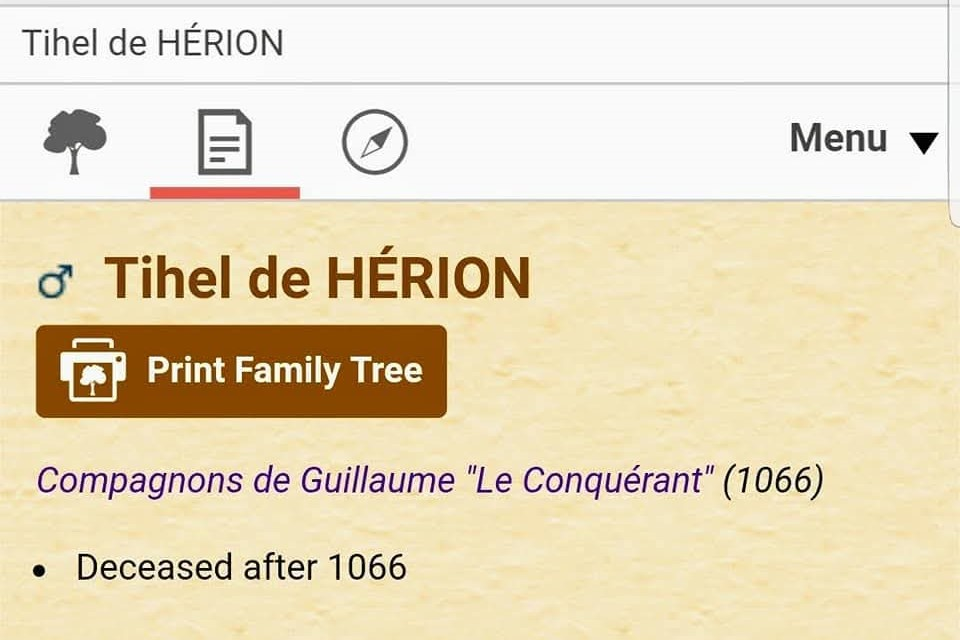

Like other Border families, many Herons were transported to the Ulster Plantation during James's "pacification" of the Borders.

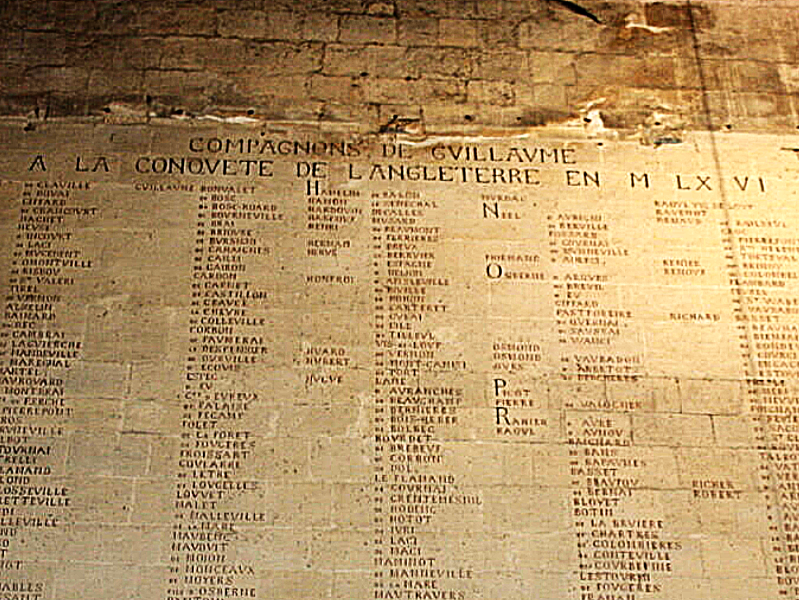
