= Robinson Souttar =

British Liberal Party politician

The Right Honourable Robinson Souttar MP
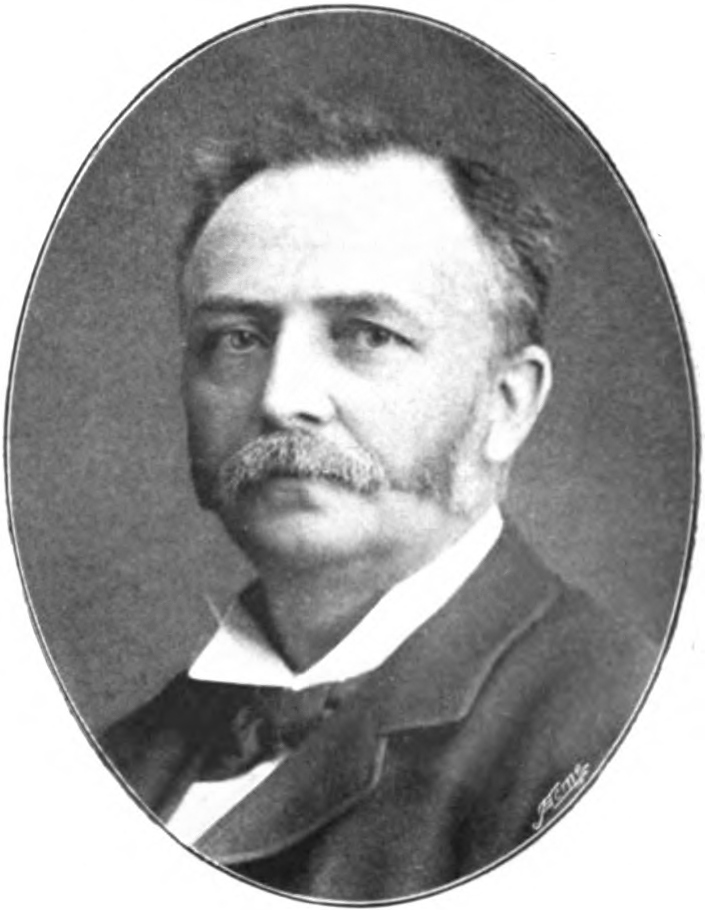

Member of Parliament for Dumfriesshire
- In office 1895–1900
- Preceded by: William Jardine Herries Maxwell
- Succeeded by: William Jardine Herries Maxwell
- Majority: 13

Robinson Souttar (23 October 1848 – 4 April 1912) was a British Liberal Party politician.

He first stood for Parliament at the 1892 general election, when he was an unsuccessful candidate in the Conservative-held Oxford seat.

He was elected at the 1895 general election as the member of parliament (MP) for Dumfriesshire, defeating the sitting Liberal Unionist MP William Maxwell by a majority of only 13 votes. Maxwell regained the seat in 1900, and Souttar did not stand again.

Souttar was an advocate for peace during the Boer War speaking at a Peace movement meeting at Exeter Hall in March 1900 alongside Lloyd George.

Parliament of the United Kingdom
Preceded by William Maxwell	Member of Parliament for Dumfriesshire; 1895 – 1900	Succeeded by William Maxwell
