= John Mackie (Kirkcudbright MP) =

Member of Parliament for Kirkcudbrightshire
- In office 20 February 1850 – 3 April 1857
- Preceded by: Thomas Maitland
- Succeeded by: James Mackie

Personal details
- Died: 3 July 1858
- Party: Whig
- Children: James Mackie

John Mackie (died 3 July 1858) was a British Whig politician.

He was elected Whig MP for Kirkcudbrightshire at a by-election in 1850—caused by Thomas Maitland's appointment as a senator of the College of Justice—and held the seat until the 1857 general election, when he stepped down in favour of his son James Mackie.

Parliament of the United Kingdom
Preceded by Thomas Maitland	Member of Parliament for Kirkcudbrightshire; 1850–1857	Succeeded by James Mackie
