= James Dunlop of Dunlop =

Scottish Laird and British military officer

Lieutenant-general James Dunlop of Dunlop 21st of that ilk
- Born: 19 June 1759; East Ayrshire, Scotland
- Died: 30 March 1832 (aged 72); Southwick, Kirkcudbrightshire, Scotland
- Military career
- Allegiance: United Kingdom
- Branch: British Army
- Rank: Lieutenant general
- Units: 82nd Foot; 80th Foot; 77th Foot; 59th Foot; 75th (Stirlingshire) Regiment of Foot
- Conflicts: American Revolutionary War; Third Anglo-Mysore War; Fourth Anglo-Mysore War; Peninsular War

Lieutenant-general James Wallace Dunlop, 21st of that ilk (19 June 1759 – 30 March 1832) was a Scottish laird and British military officer who distinguished himself in India and the Napoleonic Wars. Dunlop led the left column at the Battle of Seringapatam and commanded the 5th Division at Battle of Fuentes de Oñoro. The Duke of Wellington regarded his retirement from the military as "...a real loss" though Dunlop subsequently went on to have a successful career in politics.

== Personal life ==
James Wallace Dunlop was born on 19 June 1759, the fifth son of John Dunlop of Dunlop, Ayrshire and Frances Anna Dunlop (née Wallace), the daughter of Sir Thomas Wallace of Craigie. In 1784 he became the 21st Dunlop when his father transferred the estates to him. He married Julia Baillie, the daughter of Hugh Baillie, a landowner at Monkton, on 20 July 1802. They had five children, three sons and two daughters. Dunlop died at his family home Newfield, Southwick, Kirkcudbrightshire, on 30 March 1832.

== Military career ==
=== American Revolutionary War ===
On 16 December 1777, James Dunlop enlisted as an ensign in the newly established 82nd Foot, a regiment raised from the Duke of Hamilton's estates in the Lowlands, for service in the American Revolutionary Wars. He was promoted to lieutenant in January 1778 and was immediately dispatched to Nova Scotia.

Dunlop and his regiment were sent to reinforce the British garrison in New York in the beginning of 1779, but their transport vessel was wrecked off the coast of New Jersey and the few survivors, of which Dunlop was one, were all captured. He was later released in exchange for American prisoners, and joined the 80th Regiment of Foot which was then sent to Virginia. In April 1781 Dunlop was dispatched to Charleston with news of the seizure of Chesapeake Estuary, before joining a detachment charged with holding Cape Fear. Following the surrender of Cornwallis at Yorktown, Dunlop commanded mounted troops, covering the garrison's withdrawal from Wilmington. Thereafter he rejoined the 82nd and served on the Halifax Station, where he was promoted to captain on 6 May 1782.

With cessation of hostilities in 1783, the regiment was sent home but the troopship again encountered difficulties, shipping water and arriving in Antigua instead. The regiment eventually made it back to Scotland in 1784 when it was disbanded and Dunlop found himself on half-pay. Shortly afterwards however he was given the Dunlop estates by his father and thus became the 21st Dunlop of that ilk.

=== Service in India ===
On 25 December 1787 Dunlop was transferred to India as captain in the 77th Foot, a regiment drawn mainly from his own estates, and one of four new regiments which, along with the 74th, 75th and 76th, were requested by the Board of Control for the Affairs of India. These regiments were not popular with the East India Company who objected to paying for four regiments that were thought to be surplus to requirements. Initially refused transportation on Company ships, a compromise was agreed whereby half the officers would be taken from the company's own unemployed officers.

Dunlop served under Cornwallis in the Third Anglo-Mysore War against the forces of Tipu Sultan. He was made Deputy Paymaster-General to the British contingent of the Bombay Army, then later, the military secretary to the Bombay Government. Promoted to brevet major on 1 March 1794, Dunlop was confirmed major of his regiment on 15 September 1795 and promoted to lieutenant-colonel of the 77th Foot on 12 December 1795. When news of his promotion arrived in India, Dunlop resigned his staff appointments and rejoined his regiment. After leading a successful campaign in Malabar, he became the senior officer at Kochi Kerala.

Dunlop commanded a brigade in the Fourth Anglo-Mysore War and served at the Battle of Seedaseer 6 March 1799. Dunlop received a severe sword wound whilst leading the left column at the Storming of Seringapatam on 4 May. Tipu Sultan, who was killed during the battle, had his lands redistributed and Dunlop played a role in securing British control of Kanara before returning home in 1800.

=== Service at home ===
There was a brief period of peace following the Treaty of Amiens on 25 March 1802, but hostilities with France were resumed in May 1803. On 25 September 1803, Dunlop was appointed colonel in the Army of Reserve, which had been raised specifically for the purpose of home defence, and was given command of a garrison battalion. He exchanged regiments again, joining the 59th Foot on 31 March 1804, and was stationed in Kent, guarding the coast against an expected French invasion. He was made brigadier-general on 11 February 1805 and sent to serve in Cornwall.

=== Peninsular War ===
Having been promoted to major-general on 25 July 1810, Dunlop played a short but important role with Wellington's army during the Peninsular War. Dunlop commanded a brigade in the 5th Division under Lieutenant-General Sir James Leith, who was succeeded briefly by Major-general Sir William Erskine in February 1811. When Erskine was relocated on 7 March, Dunlop took over and thus led the 5th at the Battle of Fuentes de Oñoro, 3–5 May 1811.

When Wellington withdrew his troops to Portugal in October 1811, Dunlop retired from active service and left for England. Wellington regarded Dunlop's retirement as, "...a real loss".

== Political career ==
After returning home, Dunlop embarked upon a political career as a supporter of the Conservative Party, led by Lord Liverpool. Dunlop was Member of Parliament for the Stewardry of Kirkcudbright, during successive parliaments between 1812 and 1826. In 1813, when its charter was due for renewal, Dunlop argued passionately against new requirements being imposed on the East India Company to allow missionaries to enter its territories. Liverpool's party was returned with an increased majority for a further term in the general election of 1826 but Dunlop lost his seat. He became lieutenant-general on 4 June 1814 and a colonel of the 75th Foot on 10 November 1827.

== Bibliography ==
- Heathcote, T. A. (2010). Wellington's Peninsular War Generals and Their Battles. Barnsley: Pen and Sword Books. ISBN 978-1-84884-061-4.

Military offices
Preceded by Sir Robert Abercromby of Airthrey	Colonel of the 75th (Highland) Regiment; 1827–1832	Succeeded by Joseph Fuller
Parliament of the United Kingdom
Preceded by Montgomery Stewart	Member of Parliament for Kirkcudbright Stewartry; 1812 – 1826	Succeeded by Robert Cutlar Fergusson
