= James Mackie (MP) =

James Mackie MP

Member of Parliament for Kirkcudbrightshire
- In office 3 April 1857 – 28 December 1867
- Preceded by: John Mackie
- Succeeded by: Wellwood Herries Maxwell

Personal details
- Born: 18 May 1821 Kirkcudbright, Kirkcudbrightshire, Scotland
- Died: 28 December 1867 (aged 46)
- Resting place: Minnigaff, Kirkcudbrightshire, Scotland
- Party: Liberal

James (Jem) Mackie (18 May 1821 – 28 December 1867) was a British Liberal Party and Whig politician and rugby footballer, sometimes credited with creating the sport.

== Rugby football ==
Mackie is sometimes credited as the creator of rugby football when, while he was at Rugby School in 1838–39, he picked up the ball and ran with it, becoming known as "the first great runner-in". This was against convention that, when a ball was caught, the player should retreat and kick towards the goal.

However, the sport is most often credited to William Webb Ellis, who was at the school from 1816 to 1825. The credit may have been given to Webb Ellis as Mackie was expelled from the school before the practice was legalised by the school in 1841, before an agreed set of rules was dictated, and his expulsion made him an "undesirable role model". Indeed, in an 1895 inquiry, author Thomas Hughes said Mackie had been the first to play the sport this way.

== Political career ==
Following in his father, John Mackie's footsteps, he was elected Whig MP for Kirkcudbrightshire in 1857 and held the seat until his death in 1867, becoming a Liberal in 1859. His death triggered the 1868 Kirkcudbrightshire by-election.

Parliament of the United Kingdom
Preceded by John Mackie	Member of Parliament for Kirkcudbrightshire; 1857–1867	Succeeded by Wellwood Herries Maxwell
