= Bandwin =

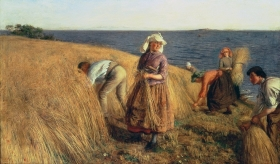
Hugh Cameron (1835–1918), The Harvest, shows a bandwin at work

A bandwin was a team of agricultural workers in the Scottish Lowlands before the agricultural revolution, who carried out the harvest.

The term was first recorded in 1642. The bandwin was characteristically made up of two teams of two women and a man who acted as reapers and a bandster who gathered and bound the sheaves. The work of women in the bandwin was unusually almost as valued as that of the men.

== Use ==
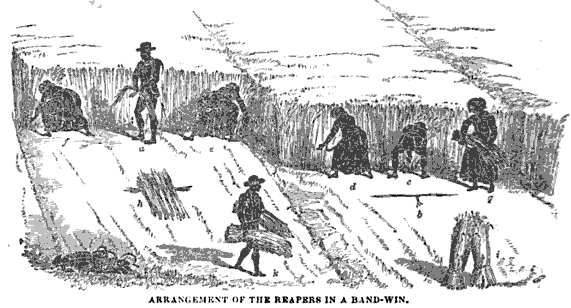
The organisation of reapers in a bandwin from The Farmer's Guide to Scientific and Practical Agriculture (1851)

The term was first recorded in 1642 in the Sheriffs records for Aberdeenshire. It may be derived from the bands of stalks used to tie the sheaves of grain, or because it made up a band or group.

== Organisation ==
Most members were women from the Highlands. Characteristically they were made up of seven members: six shearers using the crescent-shaped sickle, and a bandster who bound the sheaves. The reapers were divided into two teams, each of which worked two ridges of a runrig. The bandster was usually a man and the two teams were ideally made up of two women and one man. The man in each team cut the longest and strongest stalks in the run middle of the group. The woman on the right hand side had the most laborious task, as she had to stretch to meet the adjacent ridge. The two women in a team would, as a result, change places every landing. A bandster could bind the corn of two teams and the six reapers could cut two acres a day.

== Wages ==
The work of women in the bandwin was unusually almost as valued as that of the men. In the mid-eighteenth century female reapers received 5d a day, male reapers 6d a day and the bandster 7d.
