= Wellwood Herries Maxwell =

Wellwood Herries Maxwell of Munches (15 October 1817 – 13 August 1900) was a Scottish Liberal politician who sat in the House of Commons from 1868 to 1874.

Maxwell was the son of John Herries Maxwell of Munches in Buittle. He was educated at the Edinburgh Academy, at the University of Edinburgh, and at Exeter College, Oxford. In 1839 he was called to the bar in Scotland. He was a director of the Glasgow and South Western Railway. He was a deputy lieutenant and J.P. for the Stewartry of Kirkcudbright and Convener of the Commissioners of Supply of Kirkcudbright.

Maxwell was elected Member of Parliament for Kirkcudbright Stewartry at a by-election on 30 January 1868. He held the seat until the 1874 general election.

Maxwell married in 1844 Jane Home Jardine, daughter of Sir William Jardine, Bt. His son William Herries Maxwell was MP for Dumfriesshire.

Parliament of the United Kingdom
| Preceded by James Mackie | Member of Parliament for Kirkcudbright Stewartry; 1868 – 1874 | Succeeded by John Maitland |
