= Thomas Maitland, Lord Dundrennan =

Scottish lawyer and judge

Thomas Maitland, Lord Dundrennan (9 October 1792 – 10 June 1851) was a Scottish lawyer and judge. He was Solicitor General for Scotland between 1840 and 1841 and again between 1846 and 1850. He was also Member of Parliament for Kirkcudbrightshire between 1845 and 1850. In 1850 he was raised to become one of the Lords of Session and the Justiciary, as Lord Dundrennan.

== Biography ==
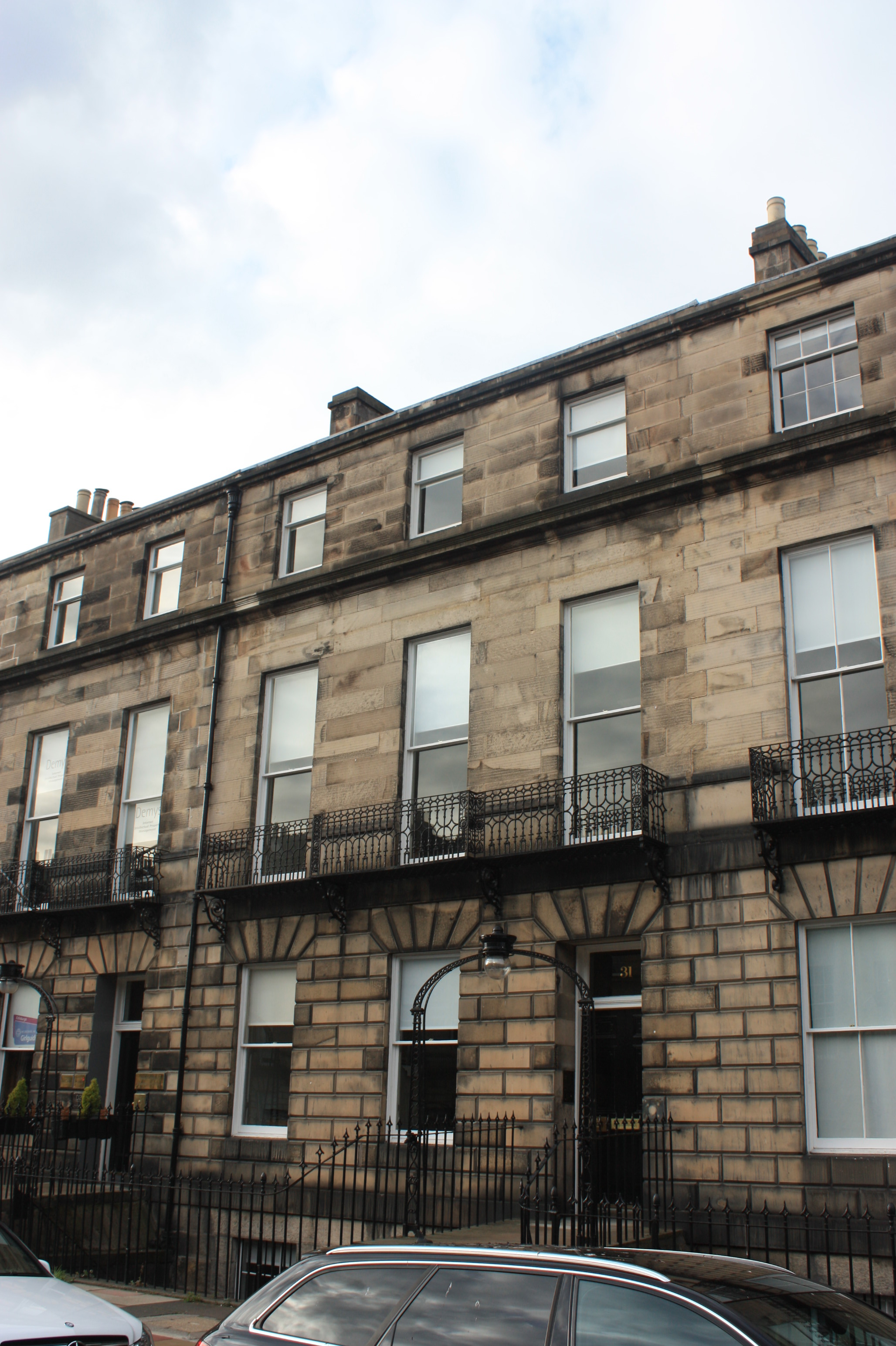
31 Melville Street, Edinburgh, where Maitland died

Maitland, eldest son of Adam Maitland, was born at his father's seat, Cumstoun House, Kirkcudbrightshire, on 9 October 1792. He studied at Edinburgh, and was called to the Scottish bar in December 1813. After practising successfully for a quarter of a century, he was on 9 May 1840 appointed solicitor-general in Lord Melbourne's administration. He vacated the office in September 1841 on the accession of the Tories under Peel to power. On the death of his father in July 1843 he succeeded to the family estates, and sat in parliament for Kirkcudbrightshire from 1845 to 1850. Lord John Russell reappointed him solicitor-general on 6 July 1846, and he remained in office until January 1850.

After Jeffrey's death he was on 6 February 1850 named a lord of the court of session, and took the title of Lord Dundrennan. While his own residence was being repaired, he went to stay with his brother, Edward Francis Maitland, Lord Barcaple, in 31 Melville Street, Edinburgh, and died there of paralysis on 10 June 1851.

== Works ==
Dundrennan was devoted to antiquarian literature, and possessed a large library – "a monument", according to Cockburn, "honourable to his taste and judgment". The collection was dispersed by sale on 10 November 1851 and eight following days. Lord Jeffrey was an intimate friend, and in 1843 Dundrennan selected and arranged the volume of Jeffrey's contributions to the Edinburgh Review, which was published in November of that year.

Dundrennan also issued in limited editions reprints of works by Geoffrey Mynshull, John Bellenden, Marlowe, Bishop Hall, and Thomas Carew, and prepared for publication the Works of Robert Herrick, with a biographical notice, (1823, 2 vols.), and for the Maitland Club, the Poems of William Drummond of Hawthornden (1832) the Works of Sir Thomas Urquhart (1834), and the Works of George Dalgarno of Aberdeen (1834)

== Family ==
On 3 July 1815 Maitland married Isabella Graham, fourth daughter of James McDowall of Garthland, Renfrewshire. By her he had four sons and two daughters. The Scottish judges, Henry Thomas Cockburn and John, Lord Fullerton, were his brothers-in-law, being married to sisters of his wife.

== Notes ==
Legal offices
Preceded by James Ivory	Solicitor General for Scotland; 1840–1841	Succeeded by Duncan McNeill
Preceded by Adam Anderson	Solicitor General for Scotland; 1846–1850	Succeeded by James Moncreiff
Parliament of the United Kingdom
Preceded by Alexander Murray	Member of Parliament for Kirkcudbright Stewartry; 1845–1850	Succeeded by John Mackie
