= Kirkcudbrightshire (Parliament of Scotland constituency) =

Scottish Parliament constituency

Before the Act of Union 1707, the barons of the shire or stewartry of Kirkcudbright elected commissioners to represent them in the unicameral Parliament of Scotland and in the Convention of Estates. The number of commissioners was increased from one to two in 1690.

After 1708, Kirkcudbrightshire was represented by one Member of Parliament in the House of Commons of Great Britain at Westminster.

== List of shire commissioners ==
- 1612: Sir Robert Gordon of Lochinvar and William McCulloch of Mertoun
- 1617: William McCulloch of Mertoun
- 1628–33, 1639–40: Sir Patrick McKie of Larg
- 1641: Alexander Gordon of Earlston
- 1643: John Gordon of Cardines
- 1644: William Grierson of Bargatton
- 1645: John Gordon of Cardines
- 1645: William Grierson of Bargatton
- 1645–46: John Broun of Carsluith
- 1646–47, 1648–49: William Grierson of Bargatton
- 1661–63: David McBrair of Newark and Alnagill
- 1665, 1667: George Maxwell of Munches
- 1669–74: Sir Robert Maxwell of Orchardton
- 1678: Richard Murray of Broughton
- 1681–82: Sir Robert Maxwell of Orchardton
- 1685–86: Hugh Wallace of Ingliston
- 1689 (convention), 1689–1702: Hugh McGuffock of Rusco
- 1690–93: William Gordon of Craig (died c.1693)
- 1693–1702: Patrick Dunbar of Machrimore
- 1702–07: William Maxwell of Cardoness
- 1702–1703: John Murray of Broughton
- 1704–07: Alexander McKie of Palgowan

== See also ==
- List of constituencies in the Parliament of Scotland at the time of the Union
