= Maxwell baronets of Pollok (1630) =

The Maxwell baronetcy of Pollok, Renfrewshire, was created in 1630 for John Maxwell, 13th of Pollok in the Baronetage of Nova Scotia. He was son of the John Maxwell of Pollok killed at the Battle of Dryfe Sands in 1593. His mother was Margaret Cunningham. He concerned himself with the colonising efforts of William Alexander in Nova Scotia in the late 1620s.

== Maxwell baronets, of Pollok (1630) ==
- Sir John Maxwell, 1st Baronet (1583–1647). He died without a male heir, and the title became extinct.
