= Kirkcudbright Stewartry (UK Parliament constituency) =

Parliamentary constituency in the United Kingdom, 1801–1918

- Former county constituency for the House of Commons
- Subdivisions of Scotland: The Stewartry of Kirkcudbright

1708–1918
- Seats: One
- Created from: Kirkcudbrightshire
- Replaced by: Galloway

Kirkcudbright Stewartry, later known as Kirkcudbright or Kirkcudbrightshire, was a Scottish constituency of the House of Commons of the Parliament of Great Britain from 1708 to 1801 and of the Parliament of the United Kingdom from 1801 to 1918. It was represented by one Member of Parliament (MP).

== Creation ==
The British parliamentary constituency was created in 1708 following the Acts of Union, 1707 and replaced the former Parliament of Scotland shire constituency of Kirkcudbright Stewartry. The first election in the stewartry was in 1708. In 1707–08, members of the 1702-1707 Parliament of Scotland were co-opted to serve in the 1st Parliament of Great Britain. See Scottish representatives to the 1st Parliament of Great Britain, for further details.

== Boundaries ==
The Stewartry of Kirkcudbright was a Scottish stewartry (later considered to be a county and sometimes called Kirkcudbrightshire), which had been represented by two commissioners in the former Parliament of Scotland. The constituency included the whole stewartry, except for the Royal burghs of Kirkcudbright (which formed part of the Dumfries Burghs constituency) and New Galloway (which between 1708 and 1885 was included in the Wigtown Burghs district). In 1918 the area was combined with Wigtownshire to form the Galloway constituency.

== History ==
The constituency elected one Member of Parliament (MP) by the first past the post system until the seat was abolished in 1918.

== Members of Parliament ==
Election	Member	Party
25 June 1708	John Stewart	
17 February 1715	Alexander Murray	
14 September 1727	Patrick Heron	
22 May 1741	Basil Hamilton	
31 December 1742	John Maxwell	
30 July 1747	John Ross Mackye	
19 April 1768	James Murray	
2 November 1774	William Stewart	
9 October 1780	Peter Johnston	
6 April 1781	John Gordon	
6 February 1782	Peter Johnston	
16 August 1786	Alexander Stewart	
23 March 1795	Patrick Heron	Whig
10 May 1803	Montgomery Granville John Stewart	Conservative
2 November 1812	James Dunlop	
1826	Robert Cutlar Fergusson	Whig
1838	Alexander Murray	Whig
1845	Thomas Maitland	Whig
1850	John Mackie	Whig
1857	James Mackie	Whig
1859	James Mackie	Liberal
1868	Wellwood Herries Maxwell	Liberal
1874	John Maitland	Liberal
1880	John Heron-Maxwell	Liberal
1885	Sir Mark MacTaggart-Stewart	Conservative
1906	Gilbert McMicking	Liberal
Jan 1910	Sir Mark MacTaggart-Stewart	Conservative
Dec 1910	Gilbert McMicking	Liberal
1918	constituency abolished	

== Elections ==
Decades:	1850s; 1860s; 1870s; 1880s; 1890s; 1900s; 1910s

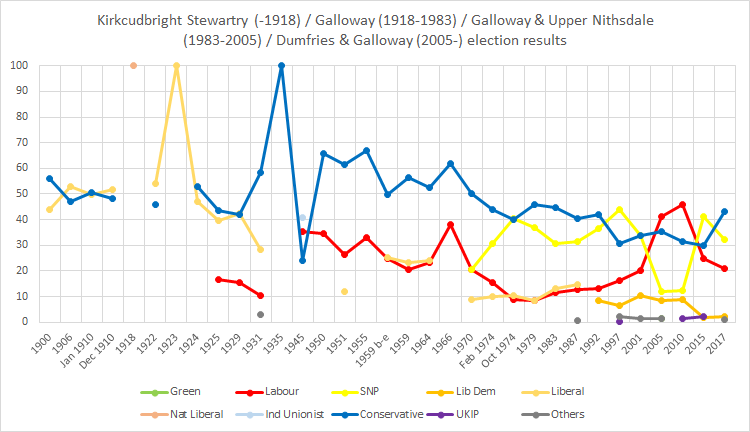
Galloway constituencies election results

=== Elections in the 1830s ===
General election 1830: Kirkcudbrightshire
Party	Candidate	Votes	%
Whig	Robert Cutlar Fergusson	Unopposed	
Registered electors		161	
Whig hold			

General election 1831: Kirkcudbrightshire
Party	Candidate	Votes	%
Whig	Robert Cutlar Fergusson	Unopposed	
Registered electors		161	
Whig hold			

General election 1832: Kirkcudbrightshire
Party	Candidate	Votes	%
Whig	Robert Cutlar Fergusson	Unopposed	
Registered electors		1,059	
Whig hold			

Fergusson was appointed Judge-Advocate General of the Armed Forces, requiring a by-election.

By-election, 3 July 1834: Kirkcudbrightshire
Party	Candidate	Votes	%
Whig	Robert Cutlar Fergusson	Unopposed	
Whig hold			

General election 1835: Kirkcudbrightshire
Party	Candidate	Votes	%
Whig	Robert Cutlar Fergusson	Unopposed	
Registered electors		1,079	
Whig hold			

Fergusson was appointed Judge-Advocate General of the Armed Forces, requiring a by-election.

By-election, 2 May 1835: Kirkcudbrightshire
Party	Candidate	Votes	%
Whig	Robert Cutlar Fergusson	Unopposed	
Whig hold			

General election 1837: Kirkcudbrightshire
Party	Candidate	Votes	%
Whig	Robert Cutlar Fergusson	Unopposed	
Registered electors		1,119	
Whig hold			

Fergusson's death caused a by-election.

By-election, 31 December 1838: Kirkcudbrightshire
Party	Candidate	Votes	%
Whig	Alexander Murray	Unopposed	
Whig hold			

=== Elections in the 1840s ===
General election 1841: Kirkcudbrightshire
Party	Candidate	Votes	%	±%
Whig	Alexander Murray	672	73.0	N/A
Conservative	Thomas Maxwell	249	27.0	New
Majority		423	46.0	N/A
Turnout		921	69.1	N/A
Registered electors		1,326		
Whig hold		Swing	N/A	

Murray's death caused a by-election.

By-election, 20 August 1845: Kirkcudbrightshire
Party	Candidate	Votes	%	±%
Whig	Thomas Maitland	486	58.6	−14.4
Conservative	James McDouall	344	41.4	+14.4
Majority		142	17.2	−28.8
Turnout		830	61.5	−7.6
Registered electors		1,349		
Whig hold		Swing	−14.4	

Maitland was appointed Solicitor General for Scotland, requiring a by-election.

By-election, 17 July 1846: Kirkcudbrightshire
Party	Candidate	Votes	%	±%
Whig	Thomas Maitland	Unopposed		
Whig hold				

General Election 1847: Kirkcudbrightshire
Party	Candidate	Votes	%	±%
Whig	Thomas Maitland	Unopposed		
Registered electors		1,351		
Whig hold				

=== Elections in the 1850s ===
Maitland resigned after being appointed a senator of the College of Justice, becoming Lord Dundrennan and causing a by-election.

By-election, 20 February 1850: Kirkcudbrightshire
Party	Candidate	Votes	%	±%
Whig	John Mackie	Unopposed		
Whig hold				

General election 1852: Kirkcudbrightshire
Party	Candidate	Votes	%	±%
Whig	John Mackie	Unopposed		
Registered electors		1,326		
Whig hold				

General election 1857: Kirkcudbrightshire
Party	Candidate	Votes	%	±%
Whig	James Mackie	365	52.4	N/A
Independent Whig	George Maxwell	332	47.6	N/A
Majority		33	4.8	N/A
Turnout		697	53.1	N/A
Registered electors		1,312		
Whig hold		Swing	N/A	

General election 1859: Kirkcudbrightshire
Party	Candidate	Votes	%	±%
Liberal	James Mackie	Unopposed		
Registered electors		1,573		
Liberal hold				

=== Elections in the 1860s ===
General election 1865: Kirkcudbrightshire
Party	Candidate	Votes	%	±%
Liberal	James Mackie	Unopposed		
Registered electors		1,353		
Liberal hold				

Mackie's death caused a by-election.

By-election, 30 January 1868: Kirkcudbrightshire
Party	Candidate	Votes	%	±%
Liberal	Wellwood Herries Maxwell	Unopposed		
Liberal hold				

General election 1868: Kirkcudbrightshire
Party	Candidate	Votes	%	±%
Liberal	Wellwood Herries Maxwell	932	57.0	N/A
Liberal	Robert Hannay	703	43.0	N/A
Majority		229	14.0	N/A
Turnout		1,635	84.3	N/A
Registered electors		1,940		
Liberal hold				

=== Elections in the 1870s ===
General election 1874: Kirkcudbrightshire
Party	Candidate	Votes	%	±%
Liberal	John Maitland	835	50.1	N/A
Conservative	Horatio Granville Murray Stewart	831	49.9	New
Majority		4	0.2	−13.8
Turnout		1,666	83.5	−0.8
Registered electors		1,996		
Liberal hold		Swing	N/A	

=== Elections in the 1880s ===
General election 1880: Kirkcudbrightshire
Party	Candidate	Votes	%	±%
Liberal	John Heron-Maxwell	982	50.5	+0.4
Conservative	Horatio Granville Murray Stewart	961	49.5	−0.4
Majority		21	1.0	+0.8
Turnout		1,943	88.2	+4.7
Registered electors		2,204		
Liberal hold		Swing	+0.4	

General election 1885: Kirkcudbrightshire
Party	Candidate	Votes	%	±%
Conservative	Mark MacTaggart-Stewart	2,526	50.3	+0.8
Liberal	Alexander Young	2,492	49.7	−0.8
Majority		34	0.6	N/A
Turnout		5,018	87.7	−0.5
Registered electors		5,720		
Conservative gain from Liberal		Swing	+0.8	

General election 1886: Kirkcudbrightshire
Party	Candidate	Votes	%	±%
Conservative	Mark MacTaggart-Stewart	2,471	50.7	+0.4
Liberal	Alexander Young	2,406	49.3	−0.4
Majority		65	1.4	+0.8
Turnout		4,877	85.3	−2.4
Registered electors		5,720		
Conservative hold		Swing	+0.4	

=== Elections in the 1890s ===
General election 1892: Kirkcudbrightshire
Party	Candidate	Votes	%	±%
Conservative	Mark Stewart	2,485	50.3	−0.4
Liberal	Alexander Young	2,454	49.7	+0.4
Majority		31	0.6	−0.8
Turnout		4,939	86.6	+1.3
Registered electors		5,700		
Conservative hold		Swing	-0.4	

General election 1895: Kirkcudbrightshire
Party	Candidate	Votes	%	±%
Conservative	Mark MacTaggart-Stewart	2,664	51.6	+1.3
Liberal	John Archibald Duncan	2,494	48.4	−1.3
Majority		170	3.2	+2.6
Turnout		5,158	88.3	+1.7
Registered electors		5,842		
Conservative hold		Swing	+1.3	

=== Elections in the 1900s ===
General election 1900: Kirkcudbrightshire
Party	Candidate	Votes	%	±%
Conservative	Mark MacTaggart-Stewart	2,784	56.1	+4.5
Liberal	Robert Hippisley Cox	2,181	43.9	−4.5
Majority		603	12.2	+9.0
Turnout		4,965	84.9	−3.4
Registered electors		5,846		
Conservative hold		Swing	+4.5	

McMicking

General election 1906: Kirkcudbrightshire
Party	Candidate	Votes	%	±%
Liberal	Gilbert McMicking	2,715	52.9	+9.0
Conservative	Mark MacTaggart-Stewart	2,418	47.1	−9.0
Majority		297	5.8	N/A
Turnout		5,133	88.1	+3.2
Registered electors		5,829		
Liberal gain from Conservative		Swing	+9.0	

=== Elections in the 1910s ===
General election January 1910: Kirkcudbrightshire
Party	Candidate	Votes	%	±%
Conservative	Mark MacTaggart-Stewart	2,661	50.4	+3.3
Liberal	Gilbert McMicking	2,620	49.6	−3.3
Majority		41	0.8	N/A
Turnout		5,281	89.8	+1.7
Registered electors		5,963		
Conservative gain from Liberal		Swing	+3.3	

General election December 1910: Kirkcudbrightshire
Party	Candidate	Votes	%	±%
Liberal	Gilbert McMicking	2,817	51.8	+2.2
Conservative	Ronald McNeill	2,625	48.2	−2.2
Majority		192	3.6	N/A
Turnout		5,442	91.3	+1.5
Registered electors		5,963		
Liberal gain from Conservative		Swing	+2.2	

General Election 1914–15:

Another General Election was required to take place before the end of 1915. The political parties had been making preparations for an election to take place and by July 1914, the following candidates had been selected;

- Liberal: Gilbert McMicking
- Unionist:
