= Peter Maxwell, Lord Maxwell =

Scottish lawyer

Peter Maxwell, Lord Maxwell (1919–1994) was a 20th-century Scottish lawyer who served as a Senator of the College of Justice.

== Life ==
He was born on 21 May 1919 to the old, established landowning family of the Maxwells of Munches, near Dalbeattie in the historic county of Kirkcudbrightshire. He was educated at Wellington College, Berkshire.

In the Second World War, he served with the Argyll and Sutherland Highlanders and afterwards studied law at Balliol College, Oxford, later was called to the Scottish Bar as an advocate in 1951. He served as Sheriff Principal for Dumfries and Galloway from 1970 to 1973, succeeding David Brand. In 1973 he was elected a Senator of the College of Justice.

He served as chairman of the Scottish Law Commission from 1981 to 1988.

He died in Edinburgh on 2 January 1994.

== Family ==
In 1941 he married Alison Readman. They had four children.
