= Dalbeattie =

Town in Dumfries and Galloway

Coordinates: 54.932°N 3.822°W

Dalbeattie: Scottish Gaelic: Dail Bheithe; Scots: Dawbeattie
- Town
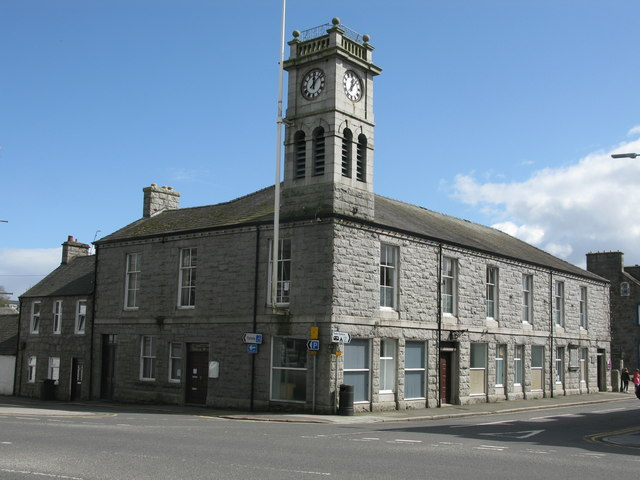
- Dalbeattie Town Hall

- Location within Dumfries and Galloway
- Population: 4,137 (2022)
- OS grid reference: NX832613
- Council area: Dumfries and Galloway
- Lieutenancy area: Kirkcudbrightshire
- Country: Scotland
- Sovereign state: United Kingdom
- Post town: DALBEATTIE
- Postcode district: DG5
- Dialling code: 01556
- Police: Scotland
- Fire: Scottish
- Ambulance: Scottish
- UK Parliament: Dumfries and Galloway
- Scottish Parliament: Galloway and West Dumfries

Dalbeattie (/dælˈbiːti/, Scots: Dawbeattie, Scottish Gaelic: Dail Bheithe meaning 'haugh of the birch', or Dail Bhàite 'drowned haugh' (i.e. liable to flood) is a town in Dumfries and Galloway, Scotland. Historically part of Kirkcudbrightshire, it is in a wooded valley on the Urr Water 4 miles (6 km) east of Castle Douglas and 12 miles (19 km) south west of Dumfries. It had a population of 4,137 in 2022.

The town is famed for its granite industry and for being the home town of William McMaster Murdoch, the First Officer of the RMS Titanic.

== Etymology ==
Dalbeattie is a Gaelic name, recorded in 1469 as Dalbaty. The first element of the name is Gaelic dail 'water-meadow, haugh'. There are two possible interpretations for the second element. The most common is Gaelic beithich, genitive singular of beitheach 'abounding in or relating to birch trees', derived from beith 'birch'. Dalbeattie would thus mean 'haugh of the birch'. The second interpretation takes -beattie to be bhàite (from bàite) 'drowned', meaning 'liable to flooding'. W. J. Watson offers this derivation for Dalbate in Middleby.

Dalbeattie is popularly interpreted as 'birch valley' or 'birch vale', which is adopted in the names of local businesses such as Birch Valley Dental Clinic and Birchvale Theatre. The interpretation of the first element as 'vale' or 'valley' may be due to confusion with the word dale. The association with 'valley' goes back to at least 1955, when the Third Statistical Account records that the 'accepted derivation' is Celtic, meaning 'the valley of the birches'.

== History ==
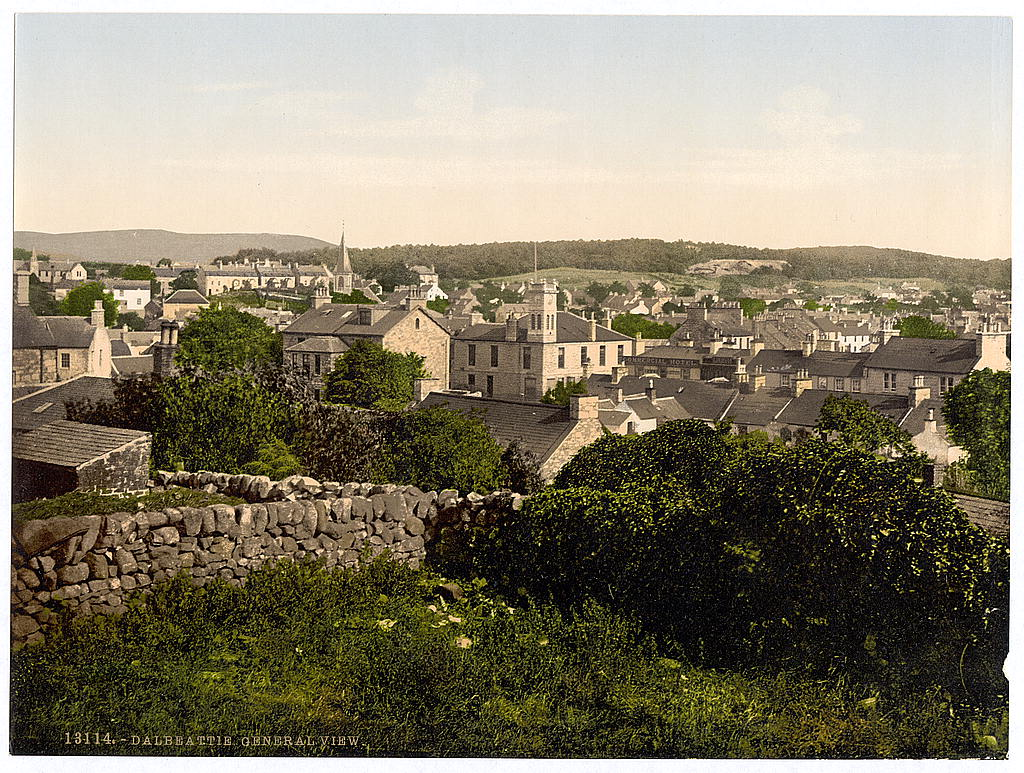
Dalbeattie, Scotland, ca. 1890 – 1900.

The formal beginnings of Dalbeattie originate in 1781 when George Maxwell of Munches and Alexander Copeland of Kingsgrange (or Colliston) decided to encourage the development of the town by feuing their property. The Maxwells owned the land on the north side of the burn and the Copelands owned the land on the south side. They also established a soup kitchen for local workers.

The building of the bridge over the River Urr at Craignair in 1797 and the rapid expansion of the granite industry in Dalbeattie attracted more people to settle in the town.

== Governance ==
The town is under the management of Dumfries and Galloway council and is located in the Abbey ward. The town is in the Westminster constituency of Dumfries and Galloway and currently represent by John Cooper . In the Scottish Parliament the town is within the Galloway and West Dumfries constituency and the South Scotland region and is represented by Finlay Carson.

== Geography ==
Dalbeattie is situated in the Urr valley of which most of the east side is covered by forest. The River Urr flows from the north southwards to the Solway Firth and passes by the west side of the town. The town has an abundance of distinctive grey granite.

== Economy and landmarks ==
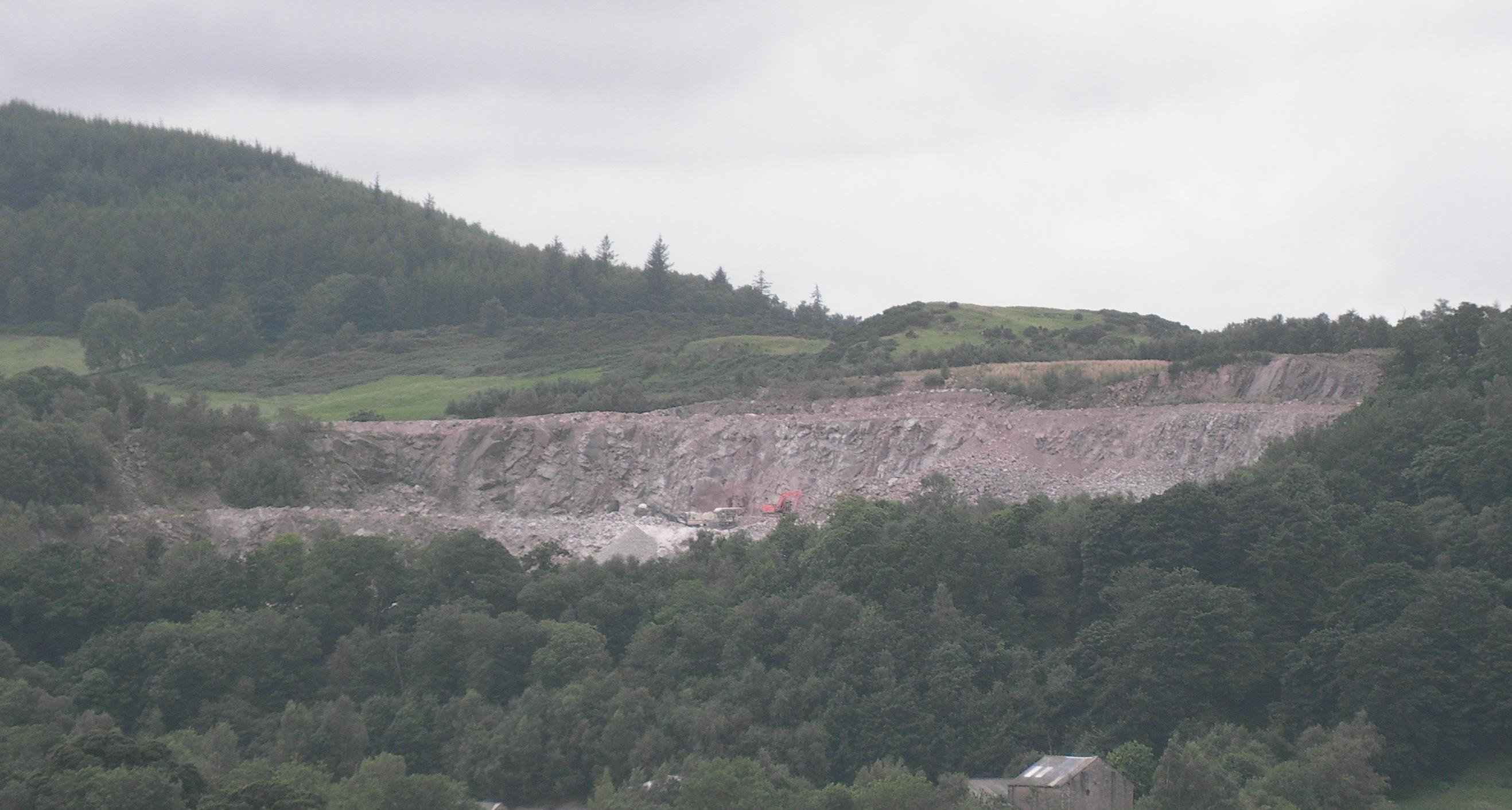
Craignair quarry is a notable town landmark

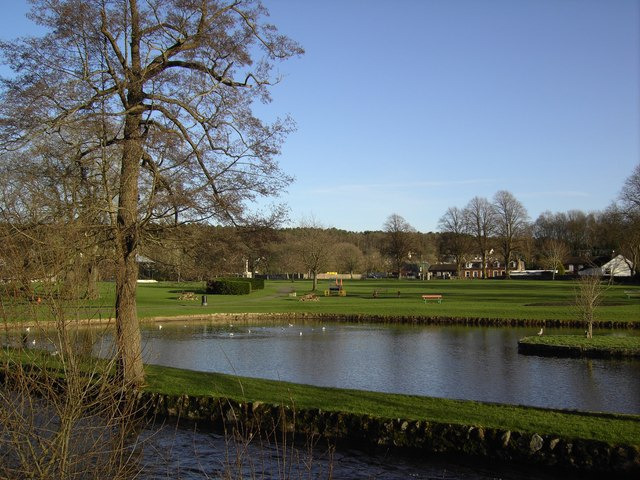
Colliston Park

Formerly granite quarrying was an important part of the Dalbeattie economy. The most prominent of which is the characteristic Craignair quarry which is clearly visible to the west of the town. Dalbeattie Granite works was established in 1820 and was situated in Craignair Street, following a direct route from Craignair quarry.

Many of the workers emigrated to other parts of the world in order to find work, a number emigrated to the United States to work at a sister quarry in Westerly, Rhode Island. Granite exported from Dalbeattie went into the Mersey Docks in Liverpool, the Thames Embankment in London, various British lighthouses, even as far as the lighthouse at the southern tip of Ceylon (Sri Lanka).

- The war memorial in Colliston Park was unveiled in September 1921, attended by Mr William Duncan. It commemorates those that died in World War I and, with additions, those that died in World War II. The memorial is a simplified version of the Mercat Cross in Edinburgh made of Dalbeattie granite, topped with the lion rampant of Galloway by Pilkington Jackson. The designers were W S Macgeorge and E.A. Hornel.
- The fountain on the junction of Mill Street and High Street was built in 1887 by D.H. & J. Newall to celebrate the Golden Jubilee of Queen Victoria.
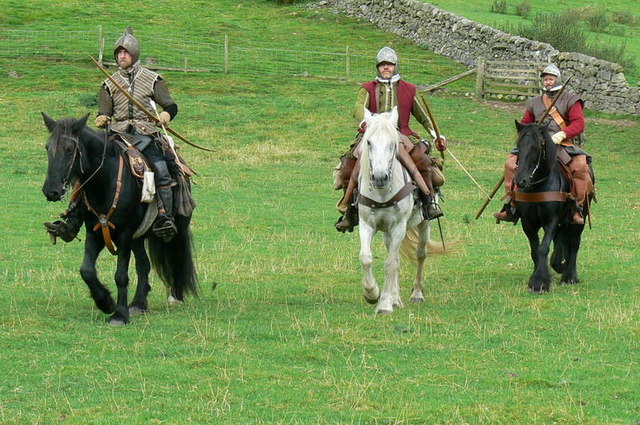
- An enactment, from 2007
  The single arch Buittle Bridge, or Craignair Bridge, that crosses the Urr Water is a Category A Listed building. It was completed in 1797 and replaced an earlier 2-arch bridge upstream which was destroyed by flooding shortly after it was built. The bridge is notable for having an unusually wide span for a single arch construction.
- Dalbeattie Town Hall was completed in 1862.
- Cardoness Castle of the McCullochs, a 15th century Scottish nobleman's home. The castle harbours a prison pit as well a tower.
- Cairn Holy Chambered Cairns, it has been described as the resting place of a mythological Scottish king. The tomb dates to the 4th milineum BC. Cairn II is considered to be the burial place of Scottish king Galdus.
- Orchardton tower, a circular tower from the 15th century. It is a free standing tower and it's only kind in Scotland.

== Transport ==
The town is accessible by roads from Dumfries, Castle Douglas, and is on the Solway coastal road. A regular bus service based in Dumfries travels through Dalbeattie and Castle Douglas to the west of the region and back. The town also acts as a minor hub for bus routes across the Solway coast. The town previously had access to the rail network; however, Dalbeattie railway station was removed in the 1960s as the line was deemed unprofitable.

== Museums and galleries ==
Dalbeattie has a museum devoted to the history of the town and surrounding area. There is also a small art gallery, the Nail Factory, which hosts temporary exhibitions, usually of work by local artists.

== Notable people ==
- Bishop Andrew Carruthers, (1770-1852) was a priest and horticulturist.
- Murray Grierson is a retired rally driver who won the Scottish Rally Championship.
- Alister Jack (born 7 July 1963), a Scottish politician who served as Secretary of State for Scotland from 2019–2024.
- John Keats and his friend Charles Armitage Brown stayed at an inn here on their walking tour of Scotland in 1818.
- Sam Malcolmson raised in Dalbeattie played football for Airdrieonians, Queen of the South and Albion Rovers before emigrating to New Zealand for whom he played against Scotland at the 1982 FIFA World Cup
- John Maxwell (1905-1962) artist born in the town.
- Peter Maxwell, Lord Maxwell (1919-1994) was a 20th-century Scottish lawyer who served as a Senator of the College of Justice.
- Jimmy McKinnell was a professional footballer who played for Dumfries club Queen of the South F.C. and Blackburn Rovers.
- William McMaster Murdoch was born and raised in Dalbeattie. He served as First Officer of the RMS Titanic and died when the ship sank on its maiden voyage in 1912.
- Ian Simpson a retired motorcycle racer who won the 1994 British Superbike Championship as well as 3 Isle of Man TT and 5 North West 200 races.
- Jim Steel had a successful career as a footballer playing in England's lower divisions with Oldham Athletic, Wigan Athletic, Wrexham A.F.C., Port Vale and Tranmere Rovers.
- Archbishop John Menzies Strain (1770-1852) in the town for twenty-three years before becoming the first Archbishop of St. Andrews and Edinburgh in 1878.
- Andrew Swann (1878-unknown) professional footballer
- Fr George Thompson (1928-2016) parish priest, 1993–2005 of St Peter's, teacher and former MP for Galloway.
