= William Herries Maxwell =

British politician

William Jardine Herries Maxwell of Munches (4 March 1852 – 31 July 1933) was a Liberal Unionist politician in Scotland.

Maxwell was the son of Wellwood Herries Maxwell of Munches in Buittle and his wife Jane Home Jardine.

Maxwell was elected at the 1892 general election as the member of parliament (MP) for Dumfriesshire, but lost it very narrowly in 1895, when his Liberal Party opponent had a majority of only 13 votes. He regained his seat in 1900, but stood down at the 1906 general election.

Parliament of the United Kingdom
| Preceded by Sir Robert Jardine, Bt | Member of Parliament for Dumfriesshire; 1892–1895 | Succeeded by Robinson Souttar |
| Preceded by Robinson Souttar | Member of Parliament for Dumfriesshire; 1900–1906 | Succeeded by Percy Molteno |
