= Maxwell baronets of Cardoness (1804) =

The Maxwell baronetcy of Cardoness, Kirkcudbrightshire , was created on 9 June 1804 in the Baronetage of the United Kingdom for David Maxwell.

== Maxwell baronets, of Cardoness (1804) ==
- Sir David Maxwell, 1st Baronet (died 1825)
- Sir David Maxwell, 2nd Baronet (1773–1860)
- Sir William Maxwell, 3rd Baronet (1809–1886)
- Sir William Francis Maxwell, 4th Baronet (1844–1924). He left no heir.

== Notes ==
Baronetage of the United Kingdom
Preceded by Gordon-Cumming baronets	Maxwell baronets of Cardoness; 9 June 1804	Succeeded by Smith baronets
