= Maxwell baronets of Orchardtoun (1663) =

The Maxwell baronetcy of Orchardtoun, Kirkcudbrightshire was created by Charles II of England and Scotland in the Baronetage of Nova Scotia for Robert Maxwell, son of the Royalist defender of Ballycastle, County Londonderry during the Second English Civil War.

== Maxwell Baronets, of Orchardtoun (1663) ==
- Sir Robert Maxwell, 1st Baronet (died c.1670)
- Sir Robert Maxwell, 2nd Baronet (died 1693)

Sir George Maxwell, 3rd Baronet is mentioned by William Fraser, as the third husband of Lady Mary Herbert, daughter of William Herbert, 1st Marquess of Powis, and widow of Francis Browne, 4th Viscount Montagu. Cokayne, however, stated that the 2nd Baronet died without issue. He regarded the 3rd Baronet's title, and those listed below, as assumed.

- Sir Robert Maxwell, 4th Baronet
- Sir George Maxwell, 5th Baronet
- Sir Thomas Maxwell, 6th Baronet
- Sir Robert Maxwell, 7th Baronet (d.1786)
