= Maxwell (surname) =

- Pronunciation: /ˈmækswəl/
- Language: English

Origin
- Languages: 1. Old English; 2. Irish
- Region of origin: Scotland, Ireland

Other names
- Related names: Miskell

Maxwell is a Scottish surname and a given male name, a habitational name derived from a location near Melrose, in Roxburghshire, Scotland. This name was first recorded in 1144, as Mackeswell, meaning "Mack's spring (or stream)" (from the Old English well[a]). The surname Maxwell is also common in Ulster, where it has, in some cases, been adopted as alternate form of the Irish surname Miskell. The surname Maxwell is represented in Scottish Gaelic as MacSuail.

== People ==
- Ally Maxwell (born 1965), Scottish football goalkeeper
- Andrew Maxwell (born 1974), Irish stand-up comedian
- Anna Maxwell (1851–1929), American nurse
- Anne Maxwell (printer) (died 1684), English printer
- Augustus Maxwell (1820–1903), American politician
- Bill Maxwell (1882–1917), Australian rules footballer
- Billy Maxwell (1929–2021), American golfer
- Brendon Maxwell (born 1991), American ice hockey player
- Brian Maxwell (1953–2004), Canadian athlete and founder of PowerBar
- Brynna Maxwell (born 2000), American basketball player
- Brookie Maxwell (1956–2015), American artist
- Bruce Maxwell (born 1990), American baseball player
- Byron Maxwell (born 1988), American football player
- Catherine Maxwell Stuart, 21st Lady of Traquair (born 1964), Scottish landowner and businesswoman
- Cedric Maxwell (born 1955), American basketball player
- Celia Maxwell, American infectious disease physician and academic administrator
- Charles Maxwell (disambiguation), several people
- Charlie Maxwell (1927–2024), American baseball player
- Chenoa Maxwell (born 1969), American actress and photographer
- Chris Maxwell, several people
- Christine Maxwell (born 1950), British Internet content pioneer and educator
- Cindy Maxwell-Ostdiek, American politician
- Clarence L. Maxwell (1860–1909), American gunfighter and businessman
- Col Maxwell (1917–2001), Australian rugby player
- Colin Maxwell (politician) (1943–2018), politician in Saskatchewan, Canada
- Constantia Maxwell (1886–1962), Irish historian
- Corty Maxwell (1851–1925), American professional baseball umpire
- C. G. Maxwell (Carman Griffin Maxwell, 1902–1987), American animator
- David Maxwell (disambiguation), several people
- Devonnsha Maxwell (born 1999), American football player
- Duncan Maxwell (1892–1969), Australian doctor and army officer
- Edward Maxwell (1867–1923), Canadian architect.
- Edwin Maxwell (actor) (1886–1948), Irish actor
- Edwin Maxwell, American lawyer, judge, and politician from West Virginia
- Elisabeth Maxwell (1921–2013), Anglo-French historian
- Elizabeth Maxwell, American voice actress
- Elsa Maxwell (1883–1963), American gossip columnist and socialite
- Enola Maxwell (1919–2003), American civil rights activist, minister, and community leader
- Frank Maxwell (1916–2004), American actor
- Gavin Maxwell (1914–1969), Scottish naturalist
- Geoffrey Maxwell (died 2025), Jamaican football player and manager
- George Maxwell (disambiguation), several people
- Gerald Maxwell (1895–1959), British First World War flying ace
- Ghislaine Maxwell (born 1961), British former socialite and convicted sex offender
- Gilbert Maxwell (1910–1979), American poet, actor, and author
- Glenn Maxwell (born 1988), Australian professional cricketer
- Graham Maxwell, American theologian
- Guy Maxwell (1770-1814), Irish-American pioneer
- Guy E. Maxwell (1870-1939), American educator
- Henry Maxwell, 7th Baron Farnham (1799–1868), Irish politician
- Howard Maxwell (born 1949), American politician
- Hu Maxwell (1860–1927), American writer
- Hugh Maxwell (1787–1873), New York County District Attorney and Collector of the Port of New York
- Ian Maxwell (disambiguation), several people
- Isabel Maxwell (born 1950), French entrepreneur
- Jackie Maxwell (born 1956), Canadian theatre director
- James Maxwell (disambiguation), several people
  - James Clerk Maxwell (1831–1879), Scottish physicist and proposer of Maxwell's equations
- Jan Maxwell (1956–2018), American actress
- Jason Maxwell (born 1972), American former professional baseball player
- Jenny Maxwell (1941–1981), American actress
- Jenny Maxwell (rugby union) (born 1992), Scottish rugby union player
- Jim Maxwell (commentator) (born 1950), Australian sports commentator
- Jim Maxwell (American football) (born 1981), American football linebacker
- Jimmy Maxwell (bandleader) (born 1953), musician and bandleader
- Jimmy Maxwell (footballer) (1889–1916), Irish footballer
- Jimmy Maxwell (trumpeter) (1917–2002), American trumpeter
- John Maxwell (disambiguation), several people
- Joseph Maxwell (disambiguation), several people
- Justin Maxwell (born 1983), American baseball outfielder
- Katherine Clerk Maxwell (1824–1886), Scottish physical scientist
- Kenneth R. Maxwell (born 1941) British historian
- Kelly Maxwell (softball), American softball player
- Kevin Maxwell (born 1959), British businessman
- Laureen Maxwell (born 2002), French high jumper
- Lilly Maxwell, the first woman to vote in Britain (1867)
- Lois Maxwell (1927–2007), Canadian actress
- Lucien Maxwell (1818–1875), American mountain man, rancher, scout, and farmer
- Luke Maxwell, English footballer
- Lukita Maxwell, Indonesian-born American actress
- Marcus Maxwell (born 1983), American football player
- Marilyn Maxwell (1921–1972), American actress
- Murray Maxwell (1775–1831), British Royal Navy officer
- Neal A. Maxwell (1926–2004), American religious leader
- Nicholas Maxwell (born 1937), philosopher at UCL
- Paul Maxwell (1921–1991), Canadian actor working in Britain
- Perriton Maxwell (1868–1947), American author, editor and illustrator
- Reid Maxwell (born 2007), Canadian Paralympic swimmer
- Reginald Maxwell (disambiguation), multiple people
- Robert Maxwell (disambiguation), several people
- Roberta Maxwell (born 1941), Canadian actress
- Robin Maxwell (author) (born 1948), American writer
- Ronald F. Maxwell (born 1947), American film director and writer
- Russell Maxwell, American general
- Sammie Maxwell (born 2001), New Zealand cyclist
- Scott Maxwell (born 1964), Canadian racing driver
- Scott Maxwell (engineer) (born 1971), American engineer
- Steamer Maxwell (1890–1975), Canadian ice hockey player
- Stella Maxwell (born 1990), Belgian model
- Stephen Maxwell (1942–2012), Scottish nationalist
- Steve Maxwell (born 1952), American fitness coach
- Steve Maxwell (soccer) (1965–2024), Australian professional soccer player
- Stewart Maxwell (born 1963), Scottish politician
- Tony Maxwell, American drummer and choreographer
- Vernon Maxwell (born 1965), American basketball player
- Walter Maxwell (1836–1895), American businessman and politician
- W. B. Maxwell (William Babington Maxwell, 1866–1938), British novelist
- W. Henry Maxwell (1935–2010), American politician
- William Maxwell (disambiguation), multiple people
- Willie Maxwell, birth name of American rapper Fetty Wap
- Zerlina Maxwell (born 1981), American television personality and writer

== Fictional characters ==
- Bob Maxwell (Coronation Street), fictional character in the British soap opera
- Bobby Maxwell (character), fictional character from the 1976 American film The Enforcer
- Duo Maxwell, in the anime Mobile Suit Gundam Wing
- Enrico Maxwell, in the manga franchise Hellsing
- Johnny Maxwell, fictional character in Terry Pratchett's novels

== See also ==
- Maxwell baronets, created in the Baronetage of Nova Scotia in 1627
- Maxwell (given name)
