= John Maxwell =

John Maxwell may refer to:

== Arts and entertainment ==
- John Maxwell (publisher) (1824–1895), British publisher
- John Maxwell (producer) (1879–1940), British film producer
- John Alan Maxwell (1904–1984), American artist and illustrator
- John Maxwell (British artist) (1905–1962), Scottish artist
- John Maxwell (actor) (1918–1982), American actor
- John Maxwell (writer) (born 1944), American writer
- John C. Maxwell (born 1947), American author and leadership coach

== Politics ==
- John Maxwell, Lord Pollok (1648–1732), Scottish politician and lawyer
- John Maxwell, 1st Baron Farnham (1687–1759), Irish peer and politician
- John Robert Maxwell, Irish politician and Royal Governor of the Bahama Islands, 1783–1784
- John Maxwell, 2nd Earl of Farnham (1760–1823), Irish representative peer and politician, grandson of the 1st Baron Farnham
- Sir John Maxwell, 7th Baronet (1768–1844), British member of parliament for Paisley
- Sir John Maxwell, 8th Baronet (1791–1865), British member of parliament for Lanarkshire and Renfrewshire, son of the above
- John Waring Maxwell, member of parliament for Downpatrick, 1820–1830, 1832–1835
- John Patterson Bryan Maxwell (1804–1845), U.S. representative from New Jersey

== Military ==
- John Maxwell (Confederate agent), secret agent during the American Civil War
- John Maxwell (Medal of Honor) (1841–1931), American Medal of Honor recipient
- Sir John Maxwell (British Army officer) (1859–1929), British Army general and colonial governor

== Nobility ==
- John Maxwell, 3rd Lord Maxwell (died 1484), Scottish nobleman
- John Maxwell, 4th Lord Maxwell (died 1513), Scottish nobleman, son of the above
- John Maxwell, 4th Lord Herries of Terregles (c. 1512–1583), Scottish nobleman, grandson of the above
- John Maxwell, 8th Lord Maxwell (1553–1593), Scottish Catholic nobleman, great-grandson of the 4th Lord Maxwell
- John Maxwell, 9th Lord Maxwell (c. 1583–1613), Scottish Catholic nobleman, son of the above

== Sports ==
- John Maxwell (golfer) (1871–1906), American golfer and Olympic silver medalist
- J. Rogers Maxwell (John Rogers Maxwell, Jr., 1875–1932), American yachtsman, son of John Rogers Maxwell, Sr.
- John Maxwell (American football) (fl. 1902–1903), American football player for John Heisman's Clemson Tigers
- John Maxwell (sport shooter) (born 1951), Australian Olympic sport shooter

== Other ==
- John Maxwell (bishop) (died 1647), Scottish prelate, Archbishop of Tuam, Bishop of Ross
- John Maxwell (archdeacon of Clogher), Archdeacon of Clogher, 1762–1783
- John Hall Maxwell (1812–1866), Scottish agriculturist
- John Rogers Maxwell Sr. (1846–1910), American railroad executive and yachtsman
- John and George Maxwell (1864–?), Canadian Gaelic-speaking fishermen
- John Preston Maxwell (1871–1961), Presbyterian obstetric missionary to China
- Sir John Maxwell (police officer) (1882–1968), Chief Constable of Manchester, 1927–1942
- Johnny Maxwell, fictional character in Terry Pratchett's novels

== See also ==
- Max Atkinson (John Maxwell Atkinson, 1944–2024), British author and academic
- Maxwell (surname)
