= Princeton University Band =

Marching and pep band

The Princeton University Band PUB, Tiger Band
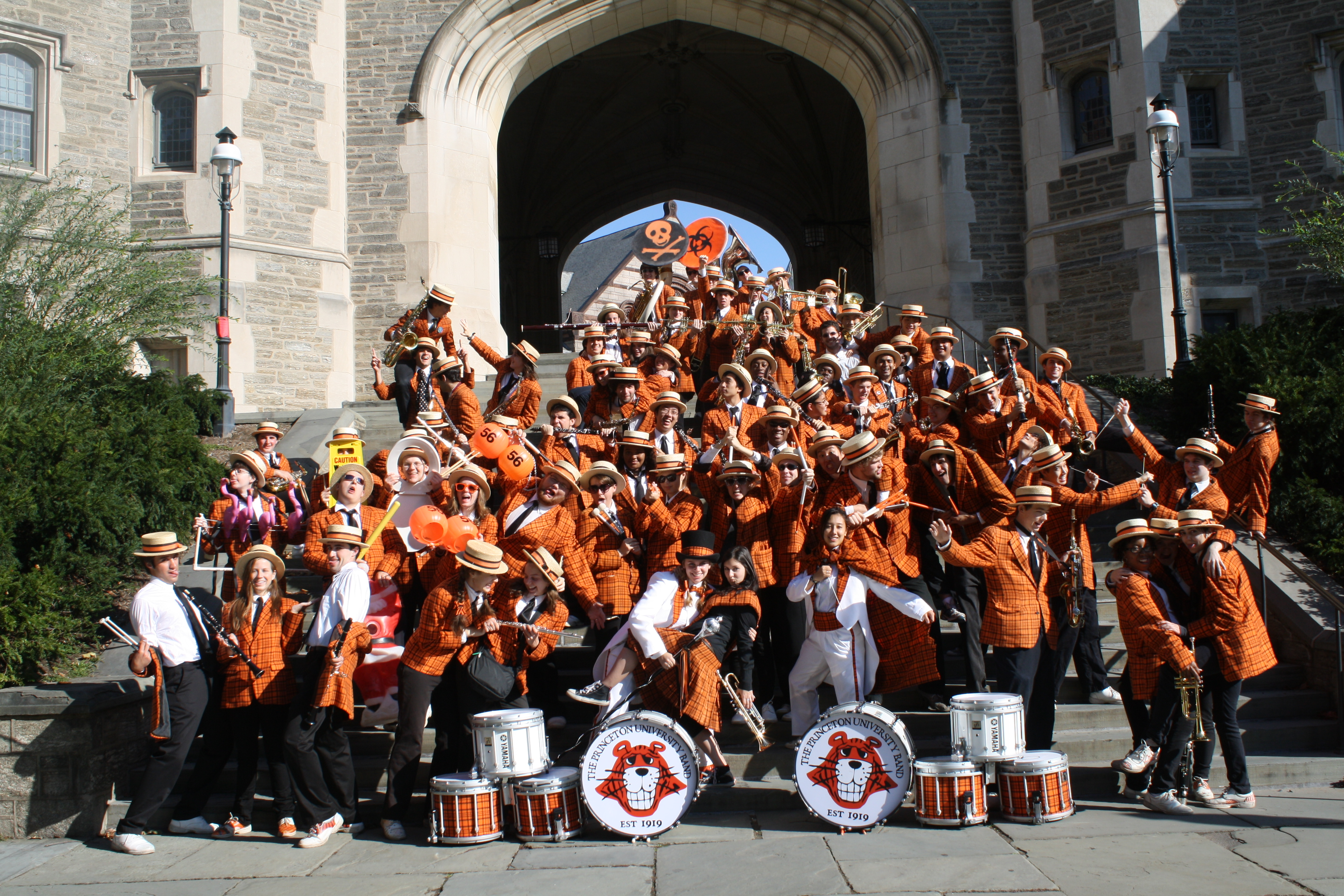
- On the steps of Blair Arch in the fall of 2010
- School: Princeton University
- Location: Princeton, NJ
- Conference: Ivy League
- Founded: 1919
- Director: Ian Bellush '28
- Members: 20-30
- Fight song: "Princeton Cannon Song"
- Website: princetonuniversityband.com

The Princeton University Band serves as the official marching band and pep band of Princeton University. Like most other Ivy League bands, it is a scramble band. To members and fans, it is often known as the PUB (pronounced Pea You Bee) or simply The Band. Many alumni refer to it as the Tiger Band.

== History ==
=== Foundation and early history ===
The modern Princeton University Band was established in October 1919 when a group of undergraduate musicians decided that a regular musical presence was needed at Palmer Stadium, home of Princeton's 22-time national champion football team; however, these events were in many ways merely a reorganization of the preexisting ROTC Band that had served a much smaller role on campus several years earlier, making Princeton's Band one of the oldest of its kind in the country. Some of the band traveled to perform at the Yale Bowl for the season's only away game, beginning a long tradition of the PUB attending all football games, home and away.

For over a decade, the PUB performed on a tight budget, clad only in black sweaters with bow-ties and white pants; however, thanks to the contributions of many alumni supporters in 1936, the band was able to afford new instruments, music, and, most notably, new uniforms — black blazers with orange collars and a Princeton Band insignia on the breast pocket.

In 1937, the PUB expanded its role at Princeton by performing not only during football games, but also at basketball and ice hockey. By the 1940s, they were performing at nearly all home basketball and hockey games, as well as at several lacrosse matches and more formal spring concerts.

=== A change in style and increased national profile ===
The 1950s witnessed an era of great transition for the band. Gradually, the band changed from a corps-style band to today's scramble band. Some alumni recall seeing the band scramble without spoken accompaniment as early as 1938, and records of scrambling exist as early as 1941. In 1955, the band began experimenting with comedic scripts to go along with the halftime scrambles. The first script on record was in a home opener against Rutgers University in 1955, by which time scrambling was a well-established feature of field performances. However, the band didn't entirely stop marching until the 1970s, which accompanied its dissociation from its sister organization, the Princeton University Symphonic Band, which has since separately evolved into the Princeton University Wind Ensemble. In 1952, the band switched from black to orange-and-black plaid blazers and continued to wear the straw hats that had been introduced a year or two earlier. With this change, the band started the tradition of wearing colorful formal wear on the field — something that has since been emulated by every Ivy League band at one point or another, as well as those of Stanford, Virginia, Rutgers, and Rice. The trendsetting new uniform was even featured on the cover of the October 1955 issue of Sports Illustrated.

From 1949 to 1981, the PUB did not miss a single football game. At 32 years and 293 games, this is one of the longest streaks in the history of college marching bands, passed only by the current holder of consecutive games attended, USC's Spirit of Troy. The PUB has never missed a home game in its near-century of existence.

The PUB's halftime format has caused problems over the years. Not only have a number of institutions banned it from performing, like the United States Military Academy at West Point and, until recently, Lafayette College, but there was serious talk in the 1970s and '80s of disbanding the group at Princeton.

=== Today ===
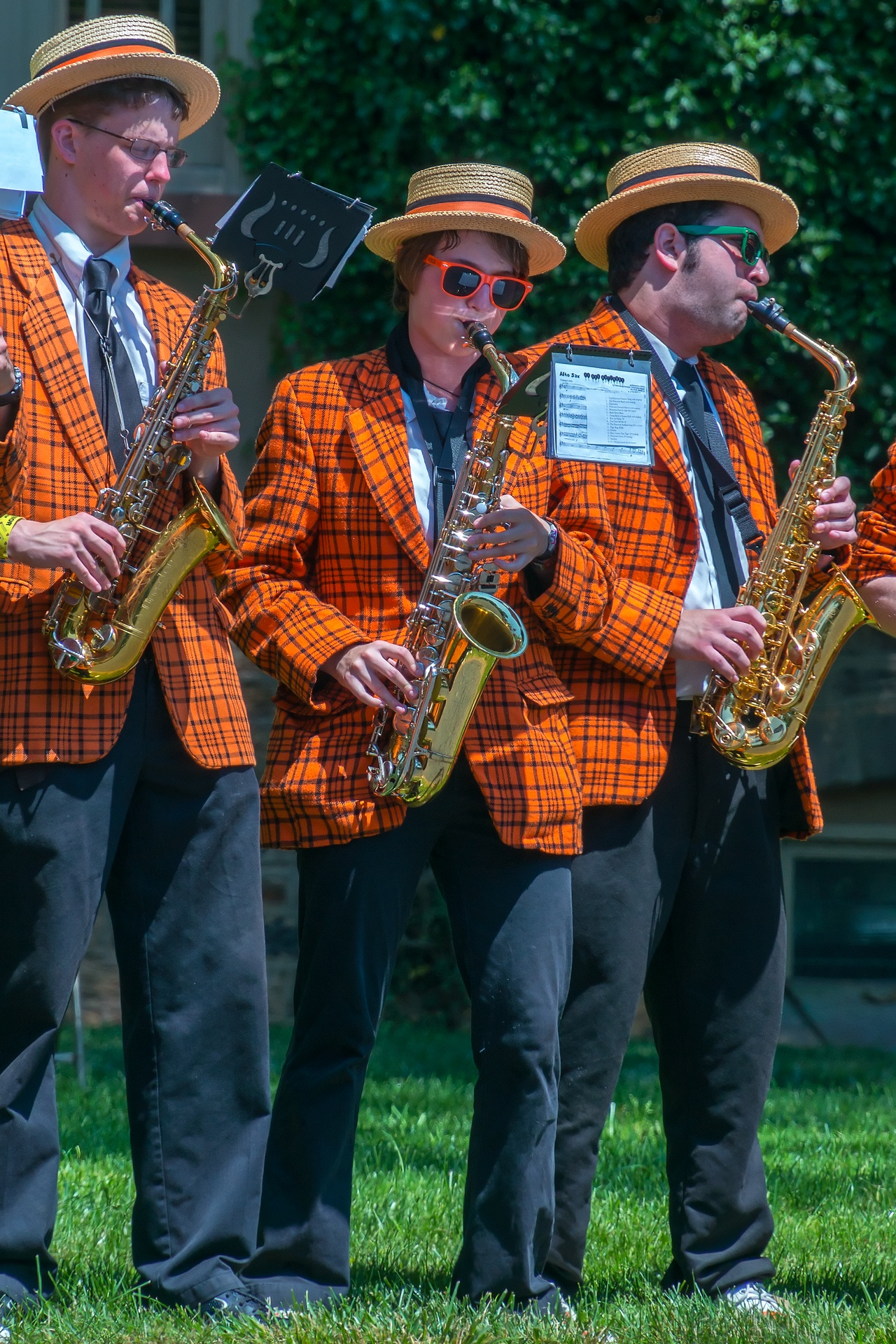
The PUB's uniforms haven't changed much over the years, but members are fond of augmenting them with funny sunglasses and pins, known as "flair"

To placate the concerns of administrators and alumni at Princeton, the PUB hired Jack Hontz, a marching band director from Strath Haven High School in Pennsylvania, as a musical advisor. The brother of a former band member, Hontz helped the band make the most out of its musical performances and steered the band away from behavior that may have attracted the ire of the university. While very helpful, Hontz filled only a consultory role for the PUB until his death in the summer of 2017, offering advice only when it was needed and leaving all leadership and decision-making responsibilities to the students. The PUB has since hired Joe Bongiovi, director of bands at Princeton High School and founder of the Philadelphia Jazz Orchestra, as their musical advisor.

As Princeton football became less nationally competitive in the latter half of the 20th century, the PUB began to focus on basketball, ice hockey, and lacrosse, following many teams to NIT, ECAC-HL, and NCAA tournaments, including several national championships, since as early as 1965. From 1990 to 2000 the PUB played at over twenty NCAA tournaments alone, including the 1998 field hockey national championship.

On campus, the PUB has come to represent the spirit of Princeton, and the PUB can be found performing or otherwise representing the University at numerous Princeton events, including building dedications, promotional videos, student performing arts showcases, orientation events, and Reunions, to name a few.

== Organization ==
The Princeton University Band is a recognized student organization of Princeton University under the Office of the Dean of Undergraduate Students and is almost entirely run by a thirteen-member officer corps consisting of the President, Drum Major, Head Manager ("Mom"), Treasurer ("Dad"), Student Conductor, four Drillmasters, Alumni Coordinator, two Librarians ("Libes"), and Diversity Equity and Inclusion Coordinator. The professional music advisor, paid out of the band's operating fund, is the only non-student involved in directing the band.

The PUB is split into four sections, each of which is represented by a drillmaster. These sections are the flumpets (encompassing flutes, trumpets, and other miscellaneous wind instruments), saxinets (saxophones and clarinets), tubonerphones (mellophones, trombones, baritones, and tubas), and garbussion (percussion and garbage). Like other Ivy League scramble bands, the band has a section of unusual percussion instruments, which the band calls "trash percussion" or "garbage percussion," and may include street signs, lawn ornaments, car parts, and anything else that makes noise when struck.

In addition to its garbussion instruments, the band has also featured many other instruments not typically found in marching bands, including recorders, melodicas, Otamatones, kazoos, Yamaha venovas, valve trombones, alto trombones, mellophoniums (sometimes referred to by band members as "elephant horns"), frumpets, Aztec death whistles, and more.

== Presence at Parades and Sporting Events ==
During the fall football season, the band performs at all Princeton home games and all away games to which it is allowed by the host institution. At each game, besides playing in the stands during pauses in the game, the band performs a pregame show and a halftime show, each of which consists of one to three songs with accompanying formations, accompanied by a humorous script. The PUB also has a repertoire of cheers which are invoked throughout the game - often mildly offensive, but amusing nonetheless.

Every Halloween, the PUB is invited to participate in the Greenwich Village Halloween Parade, to which it is particularly well suited thanks to its orange and black uniforms and colorful performance techniques. The band has also made appearances in a number of other parades including the South Amboy St. Patrick's Day Parade, the Gross National Parade, and Philadelphia's Independence Day Parade.

After the conclusion of the football season, the PUB transforms into a pep band and plays in the stands at as many Princeton men's and women's hockey, basketball, and lacrosse games as possible, including some away games. The band makes an annual trip to Penn's Palestra for the Princeton-Penn game, as well as occasional trips to nearby schools such as Columbia, Yale, Brown, and even Cornell for basketball and hockey contests. As Princeton's basketball and hockey teams are often among the best in their respective conferences, the band regularly travels with the teams to post season tournaments. Other than the absence of scrambling and formations, the Band's presence at these events is much the same as at football games.

At the end of the academic year, the PUB remains on campus for Reunions, a three-day celebration of Princetonians past and present. Since 1936 the band has led the annual P-Rade, a parade of alumni that begins with the University President, the oldest attending alum, the band, and the 25th reunion class.

== Uniforms ==
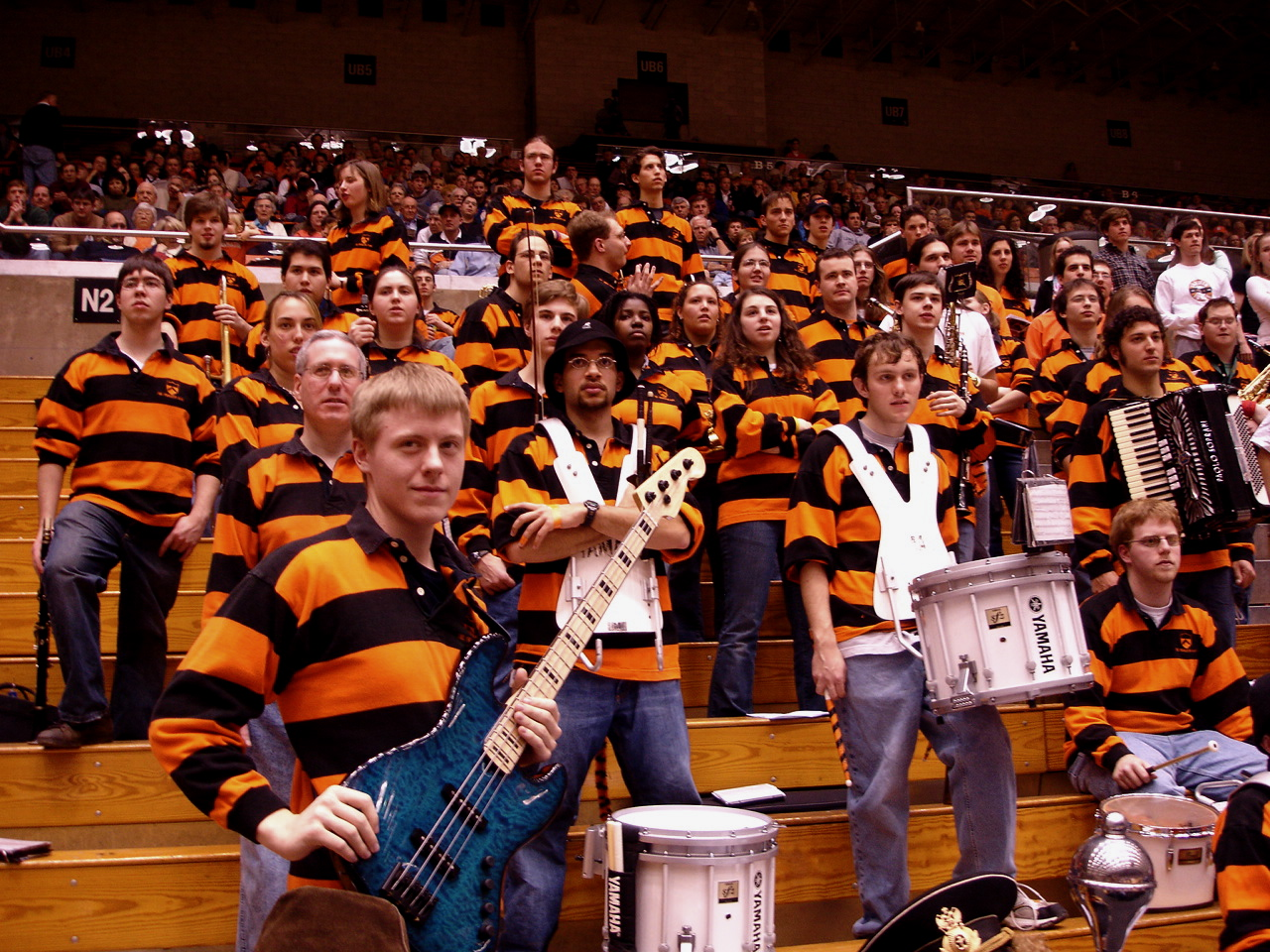
The band in rugby shirts at a basketball game.

=== "Full uniform" ===
The standard full uniform of the PUB, used for football season, parades, Princeton Reunions, and other formal events, consists of black pants, white shoes, a white dress shirt with solid black tie, Italian "boater" hat, and the distinctive orange-and-black plaid jacket. The drum major and student conductor wear white pants, long-tailed dinner jackets (known as "whitecoats") and bow ties, and the drum major wears a signature hat of their choosing. The plaid wool used in the uniforms was custom manufactured and donated by a Princeton alumnus in 1952 at Bennington Mills in Vermont. As such, the band owns the exclusive rights to the particular plaid design found on the jackets.

=== "Hats and jackets" ===
At most athletic events outside of football and tournament games, the band wears an informal uniform consisting of a plaid jacket and boater hat over jeans and a black t-shirt, preferably bearing a Princeton logo.

For a brief period beginning in 2001, the PUB replaced its typical off-season uniform with custom orange-and-black striped rugby shirts. However, in recent years, "hats and jackets" has replaced rugby shirts as the off-season uniform once more.

Graduating seniors often find a way to adorn their beer jackets with the plaid in some fashion, making alumni of the band easy to spot. Alumni often replace the typical plaid jacket with their beer jacket when playing with the PUB for homecoming or Reunions.

== Incidents, banishments, and arrests ==
=== 2023 ===
- On September 16, 2023, the Princeton University Band traveled to San Diego, CA for Princeton Football's opening game against the University of San Diego. Prior to the start of the game, the PUB discovered a hazing incident related to the USD football team and altered their come-on line to read "We haze our officers, not our freshmen, it's the Princeton University Band!" Upon the band's return to Princeton, the band was officially reprimanded for potentially invoking a hazing investigation against Princeton. The Princeton University Band does not haze any of its members or officers.
- Following Princeton's win over the University of San Diego, the PUB lobstered near a fountain inside the Torero Stadium concourse, and several band members removed articles of clothing to enter the fountain. Despite never fully disrobing, the band was reprimanded for disrupting fans and disrespecting USD property.
- Due to a combination of the two above incidents, several band members, including the entire trombone section, were forbidden from announcing future field shows.

=== 2008 ===
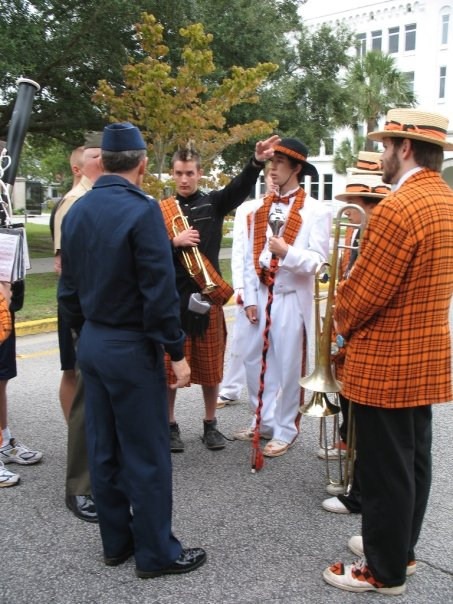
Band President in discussion with administrators at The Citadel.

- On September 20, 2008, The Princeton University Band traveled to Charleston, SC for Princeton Football's opening game against The Citadel. The morning of the game, the entire corps of cadets confronted the band during their traditional campus march around, which was pre-approved by The Citadel administration. In an attempt to defuse the tense situation, the band "scrambled," which led to a number of physical altercations between Princeton Band members and Citadel cadets. The problems started as the band marched to the game. The Princeton musicians accidentally "scrambled" onto revered Citadel land (the "Avenue of Remembrance," a campus street that honors the college's war dead) and, coupled with "humor" of questionable taste and quality, managed to seriously provoke the Charleston cadets. The situation escalated rapidly. During the brief scuffle that ensued, some hats were stolen and a clarinet was broken. After only a few moments, Citadel administrators intervened and invited the Princeton Band to continue their campus march around.
- Later that day during the game, the Princeton Band performed one of their characteristic halftime shows that had been approved and censored by both Princeton University and Citadel administrators. Despite these precautions, the large student section booed loudly during the entirety of the field performance, and many students, alumni, and other fans were offended by the band's unique brand of humor.
- During the second half, approximately fifty cadets left the Citadel student section to surround and heckle the Princeton Band. After stern admonitions from Citadel administrative officers, the students returned to the student section. The band inadvertently performed Princeton music while Citadel cadets were ceremonially folding the American flag after the game. This only inflamed the anger of the cadets.
- The Cadets' behavior prompted apologies from numerous persons affiliated with The Citadel including President Gen Rosa, (who didn't apologize and actually noted he "can certainly appreciate the enthusiasm," by the cadets), Lt Col Graham, the student body president, and many alumni and Charleston residents. The Band suffered no negative consequences.

=== 2006 ===
- After performing in the lobby of the Statler Hotel, the Band President was taken to Cornell's Public Safety Department and interrogated. The Band has been only begrudgingly welcomed back to Cornell in years since.

=== 2005 ===
- Having arrived in New York City early for the Greenwich Village Halloween Parade, the Band decided to perform in the library at New York University (NYU). Security guards detained the student conductor for several minutes and dialed the NYPD. He was promptly released with no consequences.

=== 2004 ===
- After performing in the library at the University of San Diego before the Princeton vs USD football game, the band's leaders were confronted by Public Safety officers wearing shorts. The Band suffered no repercussions.

=== 2003 ===
- During a performance in Harvard's Fogg Art Museum, a band member lobstered on the museum curator's desk, which was supporting a piece of artwork undergoing restoration. Later that day, Harvard Public Safety officers came to Harvard Stadium to detain the President and the guilty band member for questioning. Harvard and Princeton University Presidents Larry Summers and Shirley Tilghman traded heated letters. The Band suffered no negative consequences.

=== 2001 ===
- A band member is arrested for stealing a green blazer from the Dartmouth Band. Ironically, the Dartmouth Band bailed him out of jail. No charges were filed.

=== 1993 ===
- The band plays "The national anthem... of France" during their pre-game show and pokes fun at Lafayette with a flurry of France jokes. Lafayette is not amused and does not allow the PUB to Lafayette for the next 14 years.

=== 1981 ===
- After a football victory, the Band marched down the middle of the street in parade formation. The Drum Major, Steve Teager '82, was arrested for parading without a license, and then-Governor of New Jersey Brendan Byrne '49 officially pardoned him.
- The Band is prohibited from attending the football game at West Point Military Academy on October 17, because it was not considered appropriate entertainment. This broke the band's 32-year streak of unmissed Princeton football games. The band had not missed a game, home or away, since 1949 — approximately 293 games, which stands as one of the longest continuous streaks in the history of collegiate athletics. During the game, the Band listened on the radio from its practice field and performed their halftime show for a crowd of Princeton students and spectators. The following year, when West Point played at Princeton, the Band ended its halftime show with a tongue-in-cheek version of "Duty, Honor, Country," a musical adaptation of an address by General of the Army Douglas MacArthur to the cadets of West Point and marched off the field with corncob pipes.

=== 1967 ===
- After begging the network to air their halftime show, ABC hesitantly televises the beginning of the Princeton Band's show against Harvard. The first formation was "ABC," which promptly switched to "NBC." The network was extremely unhappy and did everything it could to prevent the Band from ever being televised again. The Band for years was known as "the band that no one dares televise."

=== 1959 ===
- During its Penn halftime show, a tribute to Liz Taylor, the PUB called the star "Elizabeth Trailer" and characterized her as a home-wrecker by forming a triangle after referencing her "present husband and his wife," which prompted the threat of legal action from her lawyers. Upon the advice of Princeton's legal counsel, the band sent Taylor a dozen roses, and all charges were dropped.

== Traditions ==
=== Lobstering ===
After every Princeton victory or special occasion, the Princeton University Band performs an arrangement of Rock Lobster. Band members walk around while performing and often engage with other band members, students, or fans. In the middle of the song, where the lyrics "down, down" are found in the original recording, band members lay on their backs on the ground or pieces of furniture and kick their legs while playing. The student conductor and snare drummers cue the band to stand up once more and continue the song. Known as "lobstering," this has come to be recognized as a signature of the PUB, particularly by fellow Princeton students.

Throughout the years, several smaller traditions linked to lobstering have developed:

- The most senior trombonist of the PUB is typically tasked with playing the solos that begin and end the song (as well as dictate the style with which the band plays the theme in the song's final section). A trombonist is said to be "boning certified" after being the only trombonist at a given gig, which often entails leading the band through Rock Lobster.
- Before playing the final solo in Rock Lobster, the trombone soloist typically moves to an unexpected central location, such as the top floor of a building or the top of a staircase. The student conductor then may make their way to that location while the final section is being played in order to cut the band off.
- During the first section of the song, once band members begin to move around, the drum major may opt to chase the student conductor and engage in a game of tag with their mace.
- During the last performance of Rock Lobster during a student conductor's term, they may choose to have their successor don their whitecoat and cut the band off to celebrate the officer transition.

=== Beating Up Santa ===
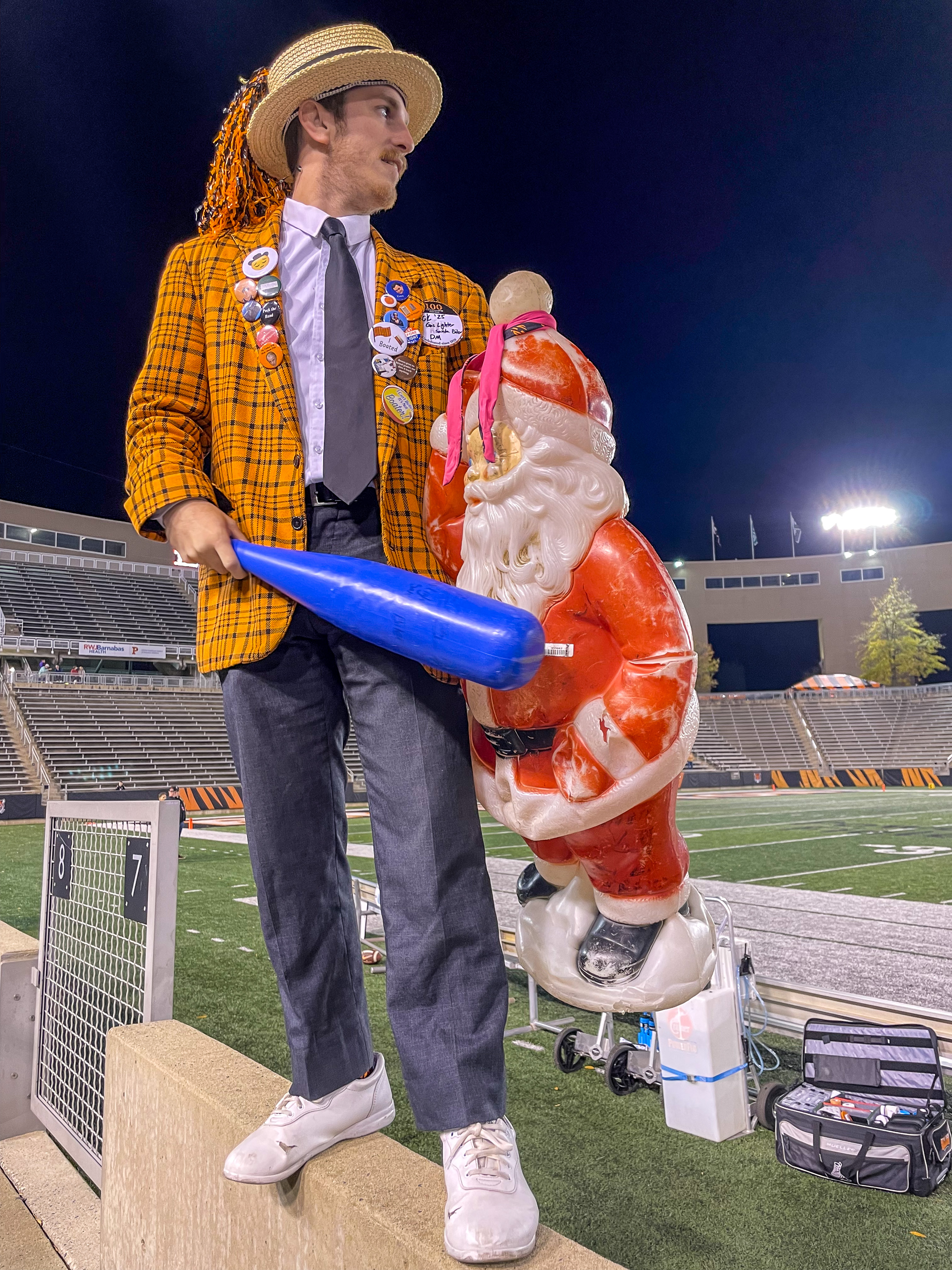
Beating up Santa in 2024

A common instrument used in the Princeton University Band is a large plastic Santa that gets beaten with a plastic bat. There have been several Santas in the PUB's possession throughout the years, each of which is named. The PUB also employs a plastic Frosty the Snowman, though less often than Santa.

In 2023, enthusiastic playing of one of the PUB's Santas resulted in it breaking. It has since been replaced.

=== Double-Double Rotating P ===
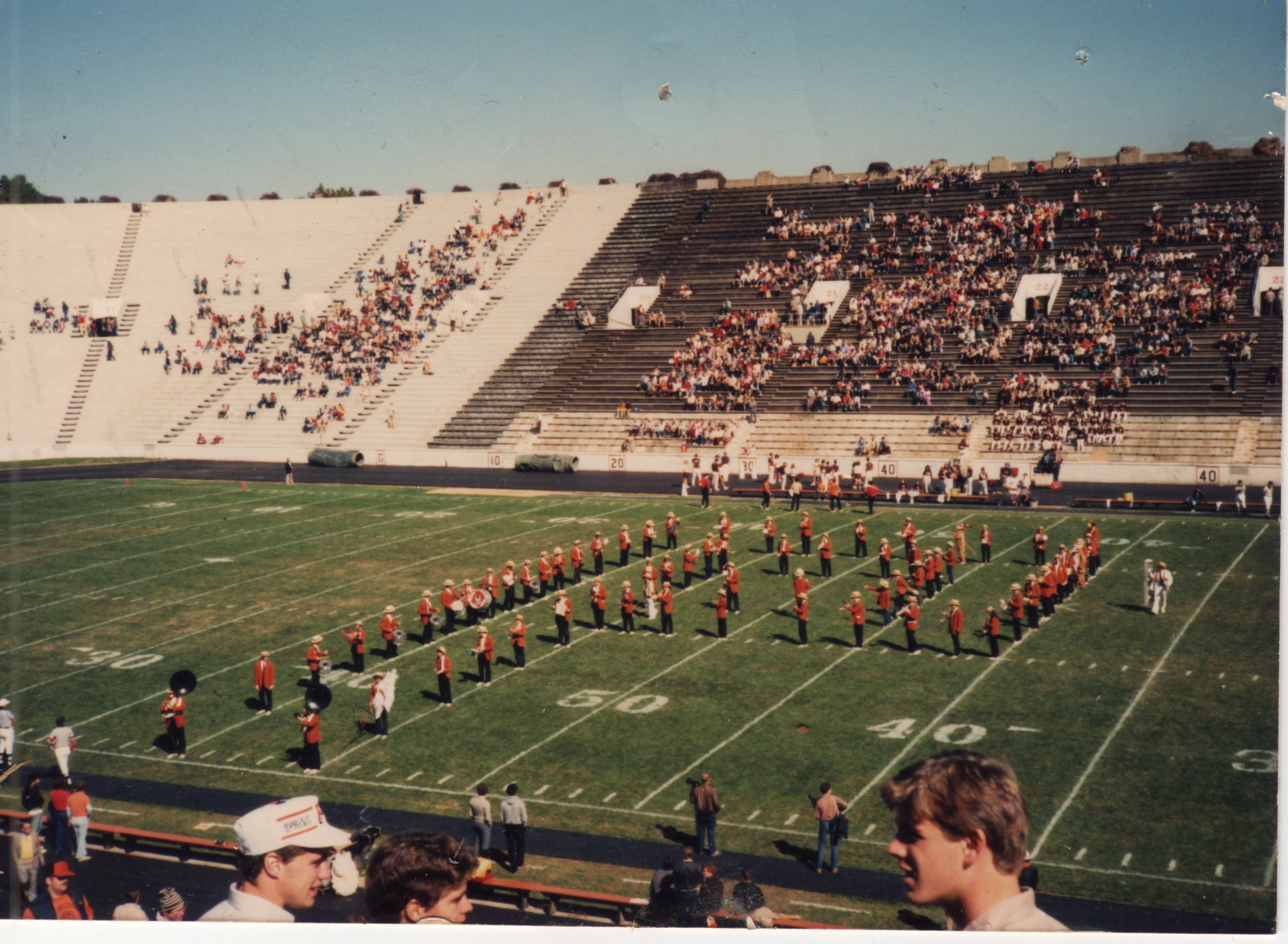
The Double-Double Rotating P in 1984.

Traditionally, the PUB ends its football pregame shows with a formation known as the "Double-Double Rotating P." The formation is a large outline letter "P" comprising an outer loop in a "P" shape and a smaller inner loop forming the interior of the letter. In this formation, the PUB plays the march "Going Back to Nassau Hall." When the band reaches the trio, the P itself remains stationary, but the members of the band start to move around the perimeter of the P, with the outer loop moving clockwise and the inner loop moving counterclockwise. The band plays the trio twice, and upon beginning the second time through the trio, the two loops reverse their respective directions.

At home games, this performance may immediately lead into a performance of The Star-Spangled Banner.

=== Random Precision Marching ===
The Princeton University Band begins every halftime show by marching on to the field to the Princeton Forward March. The band begins by marching in uniform lines split by section, but at the trio of the march, the leader of each line may march wherever they like, with all other members in their line following. This has led to instances where band members have ended up underneath the student conductor's podium, in audience seating areas, and in the end zones of the field, among other locations.

=== Fountain Gigs ===
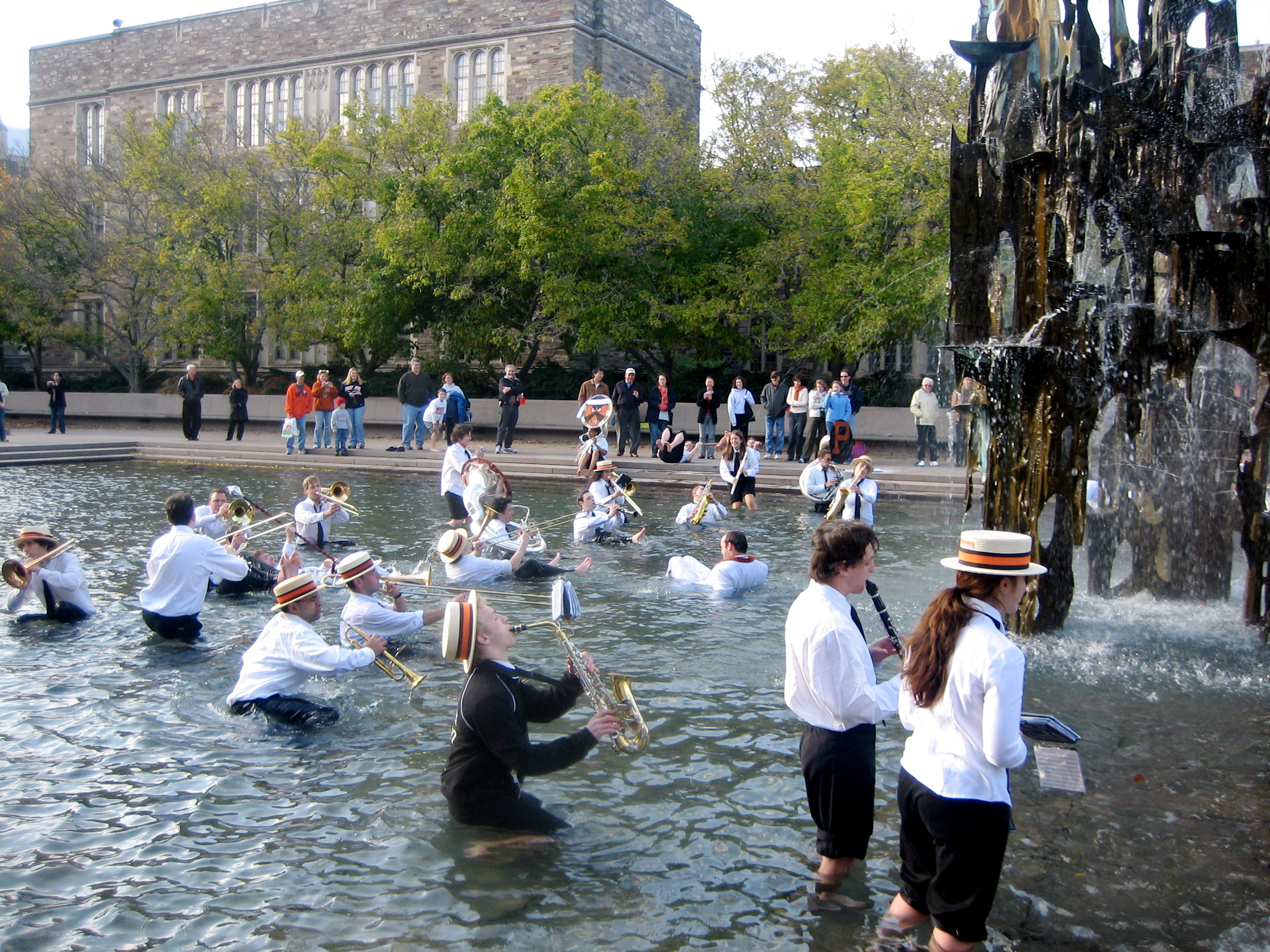
The Band playing Rock Lobster ("lobstering") in the Freedom (SPIA) Fountain.

After football victories at Princeton Stadium, the Princeton University Band goes to the fountain at the Princeton School of Public and International Affairs and plays a concert from inside. Before 2012, this would occur regardless of the game's outcome if the Brown University Band were present at Princeton.

=== Nassau Hall Gig ===
Immediately following the final football game of the season, the Princeton University Band performs a small concert inside Nassau Hall. The president, drum major, head manager, and student conductor present short speeches, the band performs one song of the student conductor's choosing, and the band sings Old Nassau before taking pictures and departing.

The PUB is one of the only student organizations allowed inside Nassau Hall, as the building is not normally accessible to students.

=== The White Castle Meat Product Tolerance Marathon ===
At the conclusion of each school year and prior to Reunions, the band takes a trip to White Castle and holds an eating contest. No time limits are enforced. Whoever can eat the most sliders in one sitting (before vomiting) is named King, Queen, or Royal of the Castle for that year, and the runner-up is named Prince, Princess, or Royal of the Castle. This event is sometimes colloquially referred to simply as the "Meat Tolerance Challenge."

Style points are awarded for some eating methods, though they do not influence the outcome of the competition. Style points may be awarded for methods including but not limited to:

- Stacking two sliders and eating them simultaneously (Two-at-a-Time, Three-at-a-Time, etc.)
- Stuffing the entire slider in your mouth and swallowing it (the White Castle Chug)
- Having a burger fed to you while doing a handstand

The current all-time record of 37 sliders is held by Jacob Jackson '26.

=== Awards ===
The Band is famous for its irreverent antics and illicit behavior. As an incentive to motivate members to maintain this tradition, the band has for many years presented several awards to its members commemorating a variety of outrageous acts.

==== Current Awards ====
- Arther H. Osborn, Class of 1907, Senior Award for Dedication & Service to the Band - a large trophy-cup given to the senior or seniors who have not been band officers, but have demonstrated exceptional service and dedication to the band during their undergraduate years.
- Turkey of the Year - awarded to the member that has exercised the worst judgment in an official, band-related capacity that year. From the late '70s until 2009, a turkey-shaped certificate was passed down. Now the award has taken the form of the clarinet broken at The Citadel mounted on a commemorative plaque.
- Grossest Member - an award, in the form of a rancid drink, given to the member who has done the "grossest" thing at an official band event that year. It is now customary to drink or chug as much of the award itself as possible upon receipt.
- Lush - "The Little Whizzer" statue is passed down each year to a first year who exemplifies the spirit of the band.
- Lushless - an award given to a first year that exemplifies the spirit of the band.

==== Retired Awards ====
- Mickey Mouse - a position offered to the most enthusiastic freshman during football season. It was the Mickey Mouse's job to entertain the band as they entered the stadium.
- T&A - an honor bestowed upon the most attractive freshman female member.
- Charms - intended for use on a pocket-watch chain, charms of gold, silver, and bronze were given to members in recognition of their service to the band during the first half of the twentieth century.

=== Postnomial Tags ===
The Princeton University Band awards postnomial tags to members to indicate officer positions and awards (both current and past). These follow a band member's name and class year when their name is written out (ex., John Doe '00 PE xDrM xDM xA xTotY, where John Doe graduated in 2000, held the positions of president, drum major, drillmaster, and announcer, and was awarded the Turkey of the Year award).

Postnomial Tags Currently In Use
Officer Positions	Postnomial	Appointed Positions and Awards	Postnomial
President	P	Announcer	A
Drum Major	DrM	Webmaster	WM
Head Manager	HM	Osborn Cup	OC
Treasurer	T	Turkey of the Year	TotY
Student Conductor	SC	Grossest Member	GM
Drillmaster	DM	Freshman Lush	FL
Alumni Coordinator	AC	Freshman Lushless	FLL
Librarian	LL	King/Queen/Royal of the Castle	KotC/QotC/RotC
Diversity, Equity, and Inclusion Coordinator	DEIC	Prince/Princess/Royal of the Castle	PotC/RotC

After the conclusion of an officer's term or after another band member is named a recipient of an award at the annual band banquet, each of these postnomial tags (with the exception of President, which becomes "PE" to indicate "President Emeritus") is prepended by an "x" to indicate an ex-officer or ex-awardee (ex. xDrM or xFL). As such, one band member may hold many postnomial tags depending on their level of involvement and commendation within the band.

Tags denoting officer positions are always organized in the order in which an individual served in those positions, but tags for awards and appointed positions may either be written in chronological order or in an arbitrary order at the discretion of the awardee (with the exception of currently-held awards and positions, which are always listed before previous awards and positions). For example, a previous recipient of the Grossest Member award who serves as head manager and previous served as treasurer and drillmaster may choose to write their name as John Doe '00 HM xT xDM xGM (award tag following officer tags) or as John Doe '00 HM xT xGM xDM (award tag listed chronologically).

There have been several more eclectic postnomial tags throughout the years, and there exists some debate over the legitimacy of some tags. Below are some examples of non-traditional postnomial tags from recent memory:

- iP, indicating interim president
- Trium, indicating presidential power shared among a triumverate of the drum major, treasurer, and head manager
- DM1/2, indicating a partial drillmaster term of one semester
- AC1, indicating the first holder of the alumni coordinator position

== Favorite songs ==
=== Princeton Songs ===
- The Princeton Cannon Song
- Going Back to Nassau Hall
- Princeton Forward March
- Tiger Rag
- The Princeton University Band
- The Princeton Stadium Song
- Here Comes That Tiger
- Princeton's Sons
- The Orange and The Black
- Old Nassau

=== Popular Repertoire ===
- Chuck Mangione's Grammy-winning theme to "The Children of Sanchez"
- Rock Lobster, by The B-52s
- Tequila, by The Champs
- Kiss Him Goodbye, by Steam, follows Old Nassau after every victory
- Michael Kamen's theme to "Robin Hood: Prince of Thieves"
- Welcome to the Jungle, by Guns N' Roses, is played before every home basketball game as a reference to the "Jadwin Jungle" student section
- The theme from Underdog is played during every NCAA tournament game when Princeton is lower seeded and winning
- "We Are the Champions," by Queen, is played after every Ivy or ECAC-HL championship victory

=== The Princeton University Band March ===
The lyrics to the band's theme song:

Oh here we are, the Princeton Band,
Playing songs of Old Nassau.
That old refrain will sound again,
And you will hear the tiger roar!
The slide trombone, the saxophone,
And the bass drum sounding grand!
With a boom, boom, boom!
And a zoom, zoom, zoom!
Oh, when you hear the Princeton Band!

== Discography ==
Memories of Princeton Vol 1 - undated
Princeton University Band - 1927
Princeton Symposium of Music - undated (1940s)
Rally Songs by the Princeton University Band - 1947
Songs of Princeton: In Praise of Old Nassau - 1951
Band - Tiger Tones, Boomerangs, etc. - 1955
Going Back: The Songs of the Ivy League - 1960
Traditional Songs of Princeton - 1962
Princeton University Band (shield album) - 1978
Going Back... Marching Forward - 1985
The Orange and the Black - 1989
Goin' Back: Songs of Old Nassau - 1994
Songs to Beat Yale By - 2000
The Princeton University Band (The Plaid Album) - 2007
Songs in the Key of LOUD - 2011
The Good, the Plaid, and the Ugly - 2015
Plaid to the Bone - 2019
So Plaid It’s Good - 2023

Several of the Princeton University Band's albums are available for streaming online. Physical copies of older albums also exist, but are no longer sold by the PUB.

== In the media ==
The PUB has an ongoing presence in, of all media outlets, Sports Illustrated. Among the highlights:

- The PUB appeared on the cover of the October 17, 1955 issue.
- After Princeton's stunning knockout of the UCLA men's basketball team in the 1996 NCAA tournament, Sports Illustrated wrote "If there really is a hoop heaven, the house band would be Princeton's, troubadours in straw hats who played the theme from "Underdog" late in the Tigers' victory."
- More recently the PUB was cited in the online version of Sports Illustrated. Paul Zimmerman, in his column of February 26, 2004, claimed "for years, the fastest rendition [of the Star-Spangled Banner] I regularly clocked was that of the Princeton band. Always around 53 seconds."

The Band won ESPN's Battle of the Marching Bands in 1996, beating the Stanford Band, another scramble band, in the final round. The other competitors in this online poll were: Rice, Wisconsin, Ohio State, Grambling, Michigan, Stanford, and Texas A&M. It is suspected, though unconfirmed, that the Band won partly due to very strong voting in their favor by bands previously eliminated who did not want any of their rival bands to win. None of Princeton's rival bands were in the competition, therefore the PUB was something of a neutral choice.

The Band has been on national television playing for the Princeton University basketball teams at the NCAA tournament.

- In 2010, the PUB followed the women's team to Tallahassee, FL as they took on St. Joseph's University in the first round.
- In 2022, the PUB followed the women's team to Indianapolis, IN as they took on the University of Kentucky and Indiana University.
- In 2023, the PUB followed the women's team to Salt Lake City, UT as they took on North Carolina State University and the University of Utah. Following the women's loss to Utah, the band followed the men's team to Louisville, KY for their historic Sweet 16 appearance against Creighton University.
- In 2024, the PUB followed the women's team to Iowa City, IA as they took on West Virginia University.
- In 2025, the PUB followed the women's team to South Bend, IN as they took on Iowa State University.
- In 2026, the PUB followed the women's team to Los Angeles, CA as they took on Oklahoma State University.

The Band has also made television appearances at the NCAA Men's Ice Hockey Tournament. They played at Princeton's first-round loss to the Bulldogs of University of Minnesota Duluth at Minneapolis in 2009 and the year before when they lost to University of North Dakota Fighting Sioux in Madison, as well as at Princeton's first-round loss to Ohio State in Allentown, PA in 2018.

== Alumni and friends ==
Friends of Tiger Band (FOTB) is the official organization for alumni and other supporters of the PUB. Proving that the PUB is forever, band members automatically become members of FOTB upon graduation. FOTB has three key functions: Hosting Band Reunions following the Home Big Three game and the P-Rade, publishing the FOTB newsletter, and (most importantly) providing support, both financially and in dealings with the University administration.

=== Notable alumni ===
- Brittany Haas A.B. 2009 - (quad toms, fiddle) Fiddler and member of the band Crooked Still.
- Elizabeth Landau A.B. 2006 - (band member) Is a Senior Communications Specialist at NASA Headquarters and was previously a Senior Storyteller at the NASA Jet Propulsion Laboratory.
- Dr. Adam Ruben A.B. 2001 - (drum major, mellophone) Biologist and comedian on Food Network's Food Detectives
- Kit Bond A.B. 1960 - (band member) The former United States Senator from Missouri
- Robert Sour A.B. 1925, who went on to co-write lyrics to jazz ballad Body & Soul and become president at BMI, did not play in the band as a Princeton student (he was a pianist); however, he was very involved as an alumnus, offering support and writing songs for the band.
