= James Maxwell =

James Maxwell may refer to:

== Arts and entertainment ==
- James Maxwell (actor) (1929–1995), American-British actor and theatre director
- Jim Maxwell (commentator) (born 1950), Australian sports commentator
- Jimmy Maxwell (bandleader) (1953–2024), American musician and bandleader
- Jimmy Maxwell (trumpeter) (1917–2002), American trumpeter

== Science and medicine ==
- James Clerk Maxwell (1831–1879), Scottish physicist and originator of Maxwell's equations
- James Maxwell (colonial administrator) (1869–1932), British physician and colonial administrator
- James Laidlaw Maxwell Jr (1876–1951), English Presbyterian medical missionary to China, son of James Laidlaw Maxwell

== Sport ==
- James Maxwell (cricketer) (1883–1967), English cricket
- James Maxwell (footballer, born 1887) (1887–1917), Scottish footballer
- James Maxwell (footballer, born 1900) (1900–1964), Scottish footballer
- Bud Maxwell (James Morton Maxwell, 1913–1990), Scottish footballer
- James Maxwell (footballer, born 2001), Scottish footballer
- Jim Maxwell (American football) (born 1981), American football linebacker
- Jimmy Maxwell (footballer) (1889–1916), Irish footballer
- Jimmy Maxwell (rugby union) (1931–2017), Scottish international rugby union player

== Other fields ==
- James Maxwell, 9th Baron Farnham (1813–1896), British nobleman
- James Maxwell (British Marines officer) (died 1792)
- James Maxwell (poet) (1720–1800), Scottish poet and essayist
- James Maxwell (scholar) (c.1581 – in or after 1635), Scottish author
- James Laidlaw Maxwell (1836–1921), missionary to Formosa
- James Shaw Maxwell (1855–1928), Scottish politician
- James Francis Maxwell (1862–1941), politician in Queensland, Australia
- James Maxwell (American politician) (1926–1984), American politician from Oklahoma
- James D. Maxwell II (born 1975), Mississippi judge
- James Maxwell, 1st Earl of Dirletoun (died 1650), Scottish courtier
- James Maxwell (1838–1893), architect, one of the founders of Maxwell and Tuke
