= Arthur Maxwell =

Arthur Maxwell may refer to:

== Public officials ==
- Arthur Maxwell, 11th Baron Farnham (1879–1957), Irish Representative peer and Nova Scotia baronet
- Arthur Maxwell, British Commissioner of Police (Hong Kong), 1953–1959

== Others ==
- Arthur Maxwell (before 1760–after 1800), English naval officer; commanded Hired armed lugger Valiant
- Arthur S. Maxwell (1896–1970), English author, editor and administrator of Seventh-day Adventist Church
- Arthur Maxwell (actor) (born 1919), American musical comedy performer in Me and Juliet etc.

== Characters ==
- Arthur Maxwell, recurring character in novelist Terry Pratchett's series, Johnny Maxwell

== See also ==
- Arthur Maxwell House (1926–2013), Canadian neurologist and lieutenant governor of Newfoundland and Labrador
- Maxwell (surname)
