= List of Stephen F. Austin State University people =

Bryan Hollins, former baseball player

This is a list of notable people who graduated and/or attended Stephen F. Austin State University in Nacogdoches, Texas.

- Bruce Alexander, former NFL defensive back
- Cliff Ammons (M.S., education), Louisiana state representative known as "the father of Toledo Bend Reservoir"
- Leo Araguz, former NFL punter
- Larry Bagley (Master of Education), member of the Louisiana House of Representatives for District 7, beginning 2016
- Derrick Blaylock, former NFL running back (Kansas City Chiefs and New York Jets)
- Chrystelle Trump Bond, dancer, choreographer, author, and dance historian
- Kim Brimer, former Texas state senator, District 10
- Robert Campbell, painter, poet, and publisher
- Shane Carruth, filmmaker; writer, director, producer, and star of Primer and Upstream Color
- Larry Centers, former NFL fullback
- Wayne Christian, statewide elected official; Texas Railroad Commissioner (2017–present); member of Texas House of Representatives (1997–2013); former president of Texas Conservative Coalition
- Gerald Clarke, artist and educator
- Tommy Condell, Canadian football coach
- David Cook, Republican member of the Texas House of Representatives; former mayor of Mansfield, Texas
- Bobby Cross, former NFL offensive tackle
- Rodney Crowell, songwriter, Nashville producer, singer, writer
- Nancy Dickey, president of the Texas A&M Health Science Center
- Floyd Dixon, former NFL wide receiver
- Hunter Dozier, 2013 MLB 1st Round Pick and Major League Baseball Player
- Spike Dykes, former head football coach for the Texas Tech Red Raiders
- Dustin Ellermann, competitive shooter; Christian camp director; winner of Top Shot (season 3)
- Lee Fitzgerald, professor of Zoology; faculty curator of Amphibians and Reptiles at Texas A&M University
- Todd Fowler, former NFL and USFL running back/tight end (Houston Gamblers and Dallas Cowboys)
- John Franklin-Myers, NFL defensive end for the Denver Broncos
- Joe Gallagher, professional baseball player
- Don Gaston, former executive vice president of Gulf and Western Industries; Chairman of the Boston Celtics
- Xavier Gipson, wide receiver for the New York Jets
- Bill Haley, Texas politician
- Todd Hammel, arena football league quarterback for 14 years
- Kevin Hannan, ethnolinguist
- Don Henley, musician, singer, songwriter, and drummer for the Eagles (1971–1980, 1994–present)
- Bill Hinds, Tank McNamara cartoonist
- Sam Hunt, former NFL linebacker
- Jason Isaac (Class of 1996), member of the Texas House of Representatives since 2011, from Hays County
- Will Jennings, Grammy (1982, 1986, 1993, and 1997), Golden Globe (1983, 1991, and 1997), and Academy Award-winning (1983 and 1997) songwriter; member of Songwriters Hall of Fame
- Derek Wayne Johnson, award-winning film director, screenwriter and film producer
- Kent Johnston, NFL assistant coach
- Joseph W. Kennedy, co-discoverer of plutonium
- Kelly Krauskopf, former president and general manager of Indiana Fever; assistant general manager of Indiana Pacers
- Ronnie Laws, musician, member of Earth, Wind, and Fire
- Bud Marshall, former NFL defensive lineman
- Brad Maule, Daytime Emmy Award-winning actor
- Robert Sidney Maxwell, historian, author
- Frank Melton, former mayor of Jackson, Mississippi (1949–2009)
- Tedd L. Mitchell, chancellor of the Texas Tech University System
- Peggy Moreland, writer
- Mark Moseley, 1982 NFL MVP; played for Eagles (1970), Oilers (1971–1972), Redskins (1974–1986), and Browns (1986)
- Joirdon Nicholas (born 1999), basketball player for Maccabi Ashdod in the Israeli Basketball Premier League
- Drew Nixon, former Republican state senator from Carthage
- Bill Owens, former Republican governor of Colorado
- Stephen Payne, international relations and energy expert
- Bum Phillips, former NFL head coach
- Mike Quinn, NFL quarterback
- Rhonda Rajsich, women's racquetball player and two-time world champion
- Mikhael Ricks, former NFL tight end/wide receiver
- Michael H. Schneider, judge, U. S. District Court, Eastern District of Texas
- Terrance Shaw, retired NFL defensive back (1995–2004); won Super Bowl XXXVI with the New England Patriots
- James Silas, American Basketball Association and National Basketball Association
- Chad Stanley, former NFL punter, tied NFL record for most punts in a season (114)
- Jeremiah Trotter, former NFL middle linebacker (Philadelphia Eagles)
- David Whitmore, former NFL safety
