= Robert Maxwell (disambiguation) =

Robert Maxwell (1923–1991) was a British media proprietor and member of parliament.

Robert (or Bob) Maxwell may also refer to:

== Arts and entertainment ==
- Robert Maxwell (producer) (1908–1971), American producer of The Adventures of Superman and Lassie TV shows
- Robert Maxwell (songwriter) (1921–2012), American harpist and songwriter
- Robert Maxwell (cinematographer) (1923–1978), American cinematographer
- Bobby Maxwell (character) (fl. 1976), fictional character in American film The Enforcer
- Bob Maxwell (Coronation Street) (fl. 1960s), fictional character in British soap opera

== Law and politics ==
- Robert Maxwell, 5th Lord Maxwell (1493–1546), Scottish statesman
- Robert Maxwell, 1st Earl of Nithsdale (after 1586–1646), Scottish Catholic peer
- Robert Maxwell, 1st Earl of Farnham (c. 1720–1779), Irish politician
- Robert A. Maxwell (1838–1912), American politician in New York
- Robert Maxwell (New Brunswick politician) (1858–1914), Canadian politician in New Brunswick
- Robert Earl Maxwell (1924–2010), United States federal judge

== Sports ==
- Robert Maxwell (footballer) (fl. 1890s), Scottish footballer
- Robert Maxwell (golfer) (1876–1949), Scottish golfer
- Tiny Maxwell (Robert W. Maxwell, 1884–1922), American football player, coach and official
- Robert Maxwell (hurdler) (1902–1985), American Olympic hurdler
- Robert Maxwell (cricketer) (1945–2024), New Zealand cricketer

== Others ==
- Robert Maxwell (priest) (died 1622), Irish dean
- Robert Maxwell (bishop) (died 1672), Anglican bishop in Ireland
- Robert Maxwell (writer) (1696–1766), Scottish writer on agriculture
- Robert D. Maxwell (1920–2019), American World War II Medal of Honor recipient
- Robert Sidney Maxwell (1911–1990), American historian
