= Joseph Maxwell (disambiguation) =

Joseph Maxwell is an Australian recipient of the Victoria Cross.

Joseph Maxwell may also refer to:

- Joseph Edward Maxwell, American politician from Georgia
- Joseph R. N. Maxwell, American Jesuit priest, academic, and President of the College of the Holy Cross and Boston College
