= George Maxwell (disambiguation) =

George Maxwell (1804–1880) was an English botanist.

George Maxwell may also refer to:

- George C. Maxwell (1771–1816), American politician
- George Maxwell (Australian politician) (1859–1935), Australian politician
- George Maxwell (born 1864), Canadian Gaelic speaking fisherman
- George Maxwell (colonial administrator) (1871–1959), Chief Secretary of the Federated Malay States
- George Ritchie Maxwell (1857–1902), Canadian Presbyterian minister and politician
- George Hebard Maxwell, American attorney and lobbyist for water reclamation and irrigation
- George Maxwell (rugby union)

== See also ==
- George Maxwell Richards (1931–2018), president of Trinidad and Tobago
- George Clerk-Maxwell (1715–1784), Scottish landowner
