= Elizabeth Landau =

US journalist and science communicator

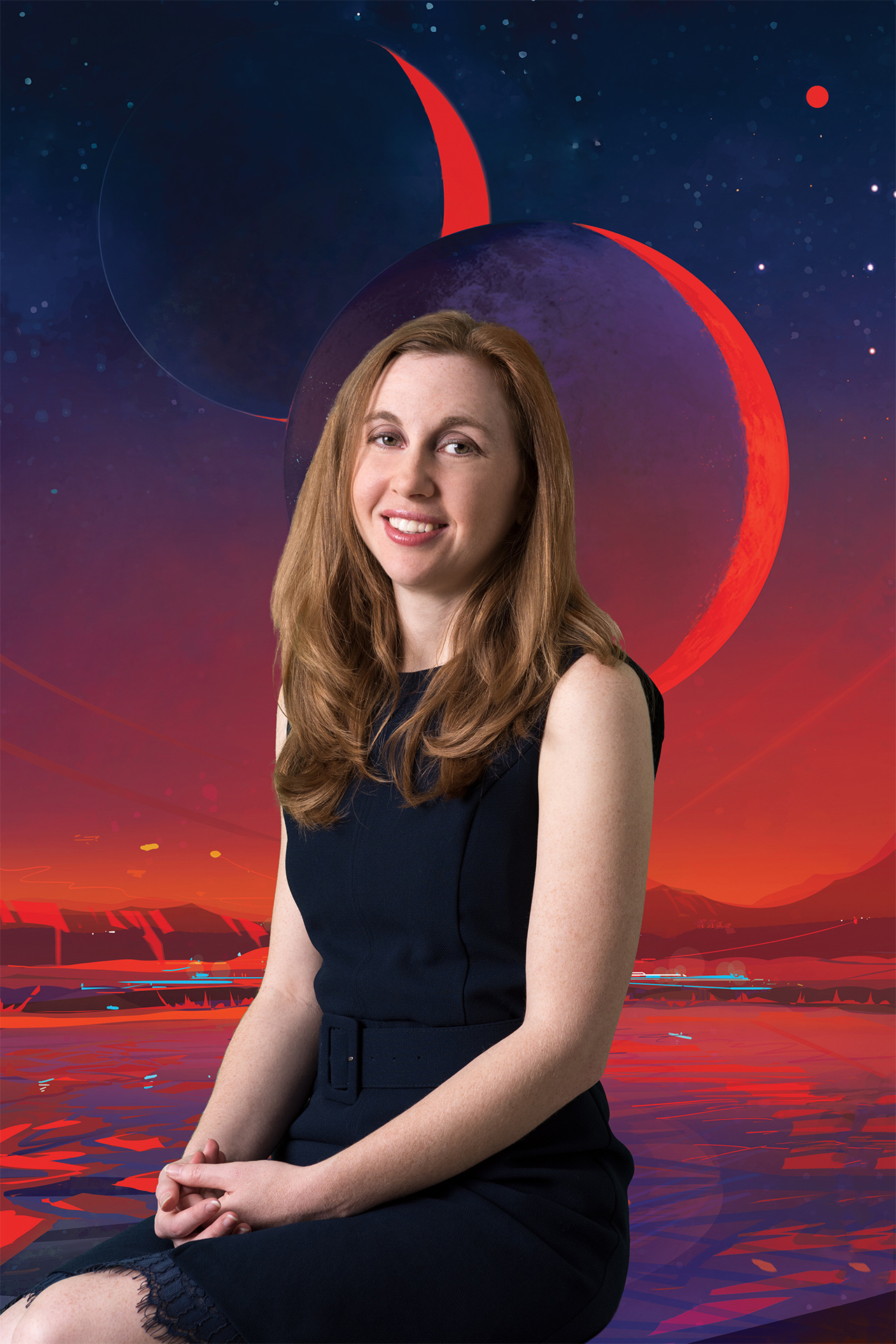
- Landau at the NASA Exoplanet Exploration Program in 2018
- Education: Princeton University (BA); Columbia University (MA)
- Employer: National Geographic
- Known for: Science Communication
- Website: lizlandau.com

Elizabeth Rosa Landau is an American science writer and communicator. She is the Senior Editor for Animals at National Geographic. She was a Senior Communications Specialist at NASA Headquarters and a Senior Storyteller at the NASA Jet Propulsion Laboratory previously.

== Education ==
Landau grew up in Bryn Mawr, Pennsylvania. As a child, she watched Carl Sagan's TV series Cosmos, which helped inspire her love of space.

She earned a bachelor's degree in anthropology at Princeton University (magna cum laude) in 2006. As a Princeton student, she completed study-abroad programs at University of Seville and Universidad de León. During her junior year in Princeton, she was the editor-in-chief of Innovation, the university's student science magazine. In the summer of 2004, she became a production intern at CNN en Español in New York. She earned a master's in journalism from Columbia University, where she focused on politics.

== Career ==
Landau began to write and produce for CNN's website in 2007 as a Master's Fellow, and returned full-time in 2008. Here she co-founded the CNN science blog, Light Years. She covered a variety of topics including Pi Day. In 2012, Landau interviewed Scott Maxwell about the Curiosity rover at the NASA Jet Propulsion Laboratory.

=== NASA career ===
In 2014, she became a media relations specialist at the NASA Jet Propulsion Laboratory, where she led media strategy for Dawn (spacecraft), Voyager, Spitzer, NuSTAR, WISE, Planck and Herschel. She led NASA's effort to share the TRAPPIST-1 exoplanet system with the world on February 22, 2017. In January 2018, she was appointed a Senior Storyteller at the Jet Propulsion Laboratory. In February 2020, she became a Senior Communications Specialist at NASA Headquarters. Collaborating with Kimberly Arcand at the Chandra X-ray Observatory, she directed the 2024 NASA+ documentary Listen to the Universe, which won several awards and distinctions from film festivals in the United States and abroad. She was awarded the NASA Exceptional Public Service Medal in 2025.

=== Writing career ===
Landau has written for CNN, Marie Claire, New Scientist, Nautilus, Scientific American, Vice Media, The Wall Street Journal, The New York Times, Washington Post, and National Geographic. Her essay "My Search for Life" was published in The Missouri Review and named a finalist for the journal's Perkoff Prize in 2026.

Landau has interviewed many prominent figures in science, such as geneticist James Watson for CNN in June 2013 and astronomer Virginia Trimble for Quanta Magazine in November 2019.
