= James Maxwell (cricketer) =

English cricketer

Personal information
- Full name: James Maxwell
- Born: 13 January 1883; Taunton, Somerset, England
- Died: 27 December 1967 (aged 84); Taunton, Somerset, England
- Batting: Right-handed
- Bowling: Right-arm fast-medium
- Role: All-rounder

Domestic team information
- Years: Team
- 1906–1908: Somerset
- 1912: South Wales
- First-class debut: 17 May 1906 Somerset v Warwickshire
- Last First-class: 22 June 1912 South Wales v South Africans

Career statistics
Competition	First-class
Matches	11
Runs scored	218
Batting average	16.76
100s/50s	–/1
Top score	67*
Balls bowled	1368
Wickets	24
Bowling average	38.20
5 wickets in innings	1
10 wickets in match	–
Best bowling	5/20
Catches/stumpings	6/–
- Source: CricketArchive, 13 March 2011

James Maxwell (13 January 1883 – 27 December 1967) played first-class cricket for Somerset from 1906 to 1908. He was born and died at Taunton, Somerset.

Maxwell was a right-handed batsman and a right-arm fast-medium bowler. In first-class cricket for Somerset he tended to bat low in the batting order, but against Gloucestershire at Bath in 1906, batting at No 10, he made an unbeaten 67, his highest first-class score. In eight matches for Somerset in 1906 his bowling was not successful, but when he returned for two games in 1908 he took five Lancashire wickets for 63 runs in the first innings of the match at Liverpool.

From 1909, Maxwell played regularly as a professional cricketer in South Wales for the Glamorgan side, which was not then of first-class status. He appeared in 52 Minor Counties matches for Glamorgan. As at Somerset, he initially batted low in the batting order, but against Surrey's second eleven in 1910, batting at No 10, he scored 108. Thereafter, he often batted in the middle order. He was successful as a bowler too: for example, against the weak Carmarthenshire side in 1911, he took 13 wickets in the match for 64 runs. In 1912, he played in a single first-class fixture for a South Wales cricket team against the South Africans, top-scoring in the home side's second innings. He played Minor Counties cricket for Glamorgan up to the First World War, but did not reappear after the war.
