= Ian Maxwell (disambiguation) =

Ian Maxwell is a British businessman.

Ian Maxwell may also refer to:

- Ian Maxwell (footballer) (born 1975), Scottish football player and executive
- Ian Maxwell (tracker)
