= Princeton Reunions =

Annual college reunion event in New Jersey, US

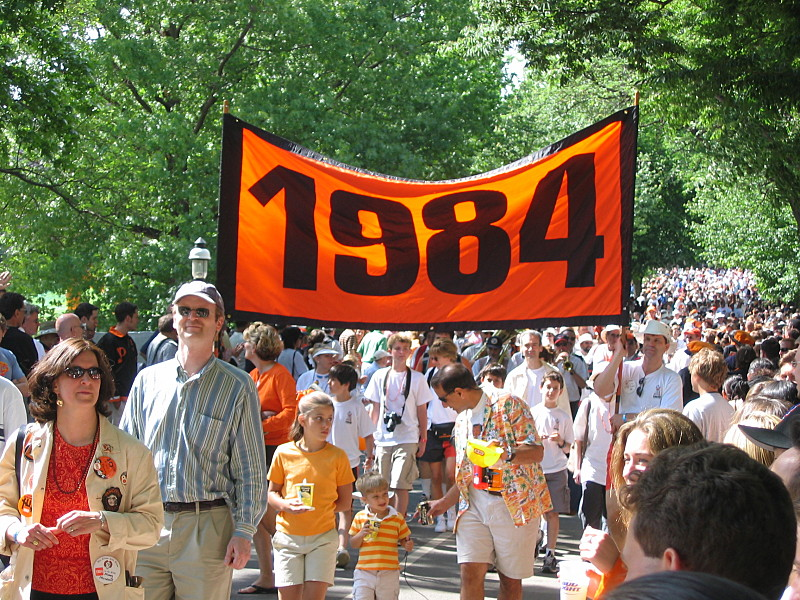
The Class of 1984 at its 20th reunion in 2004.

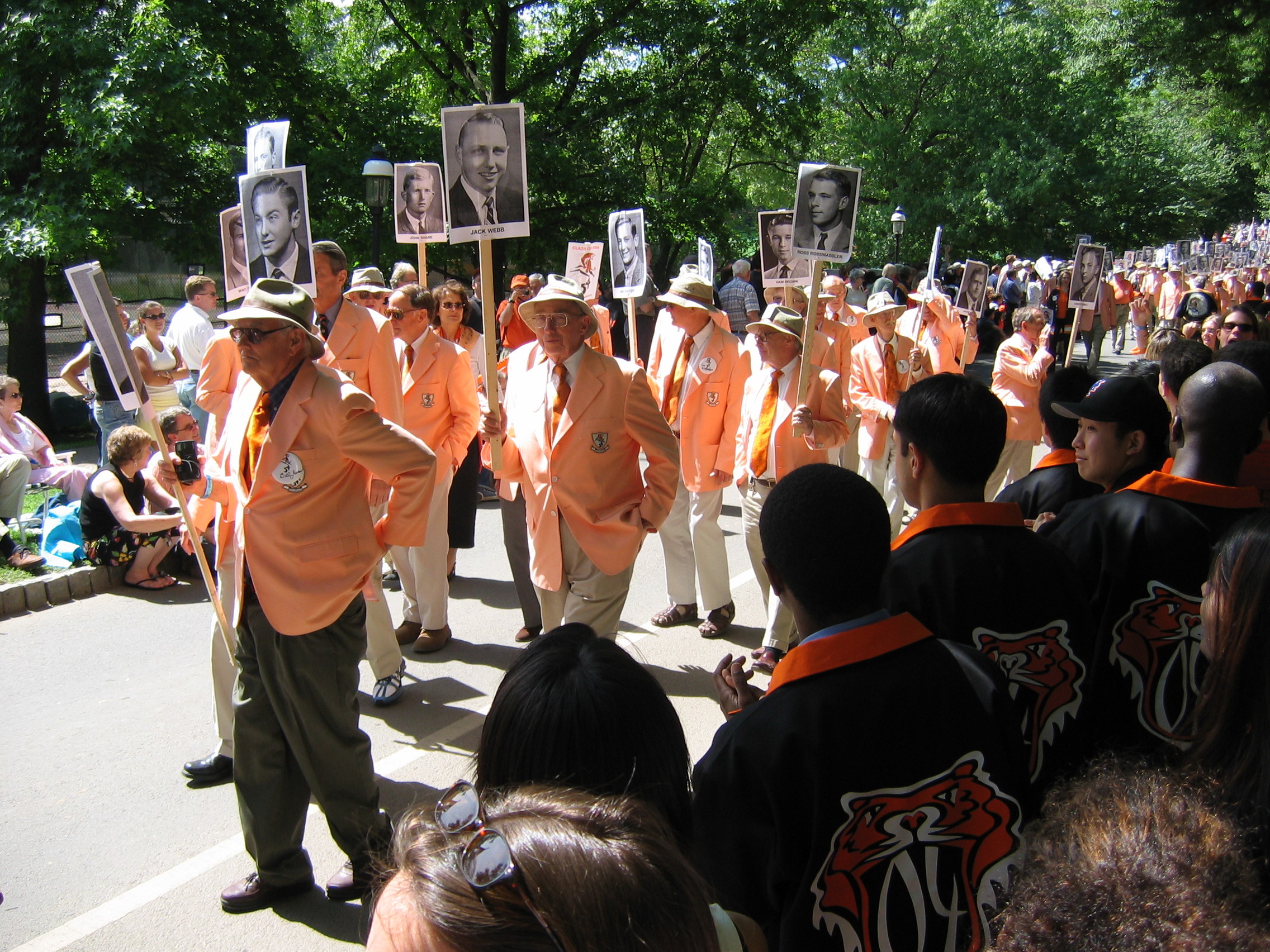
The Class of 1954 at its 50th reunion in 2004. Note the class blazers. Every class wears a unique jacket design.

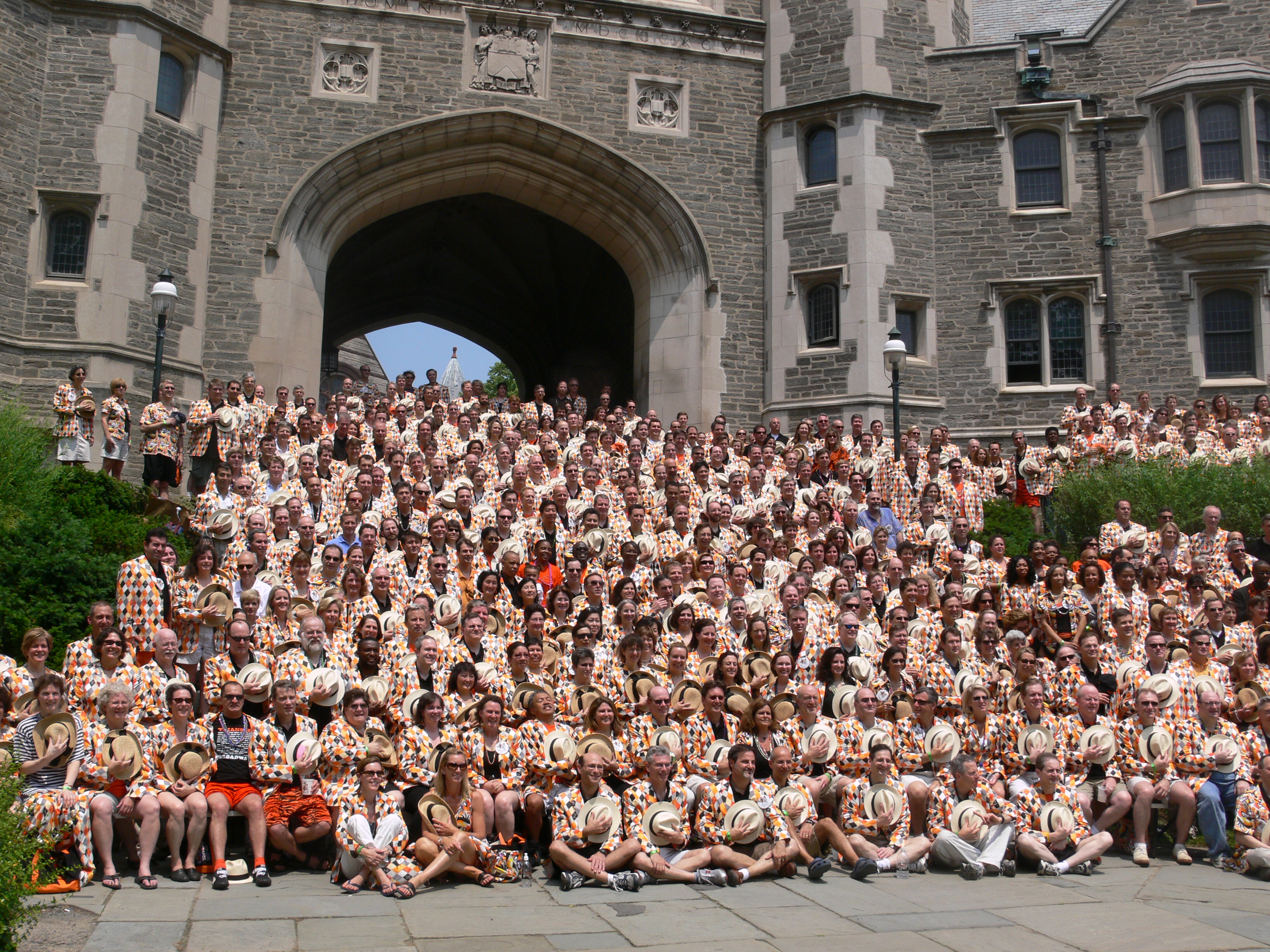
The Class of 1982 at its 25th reunion in 2007, posing for a group photo in front of Blair Arch.

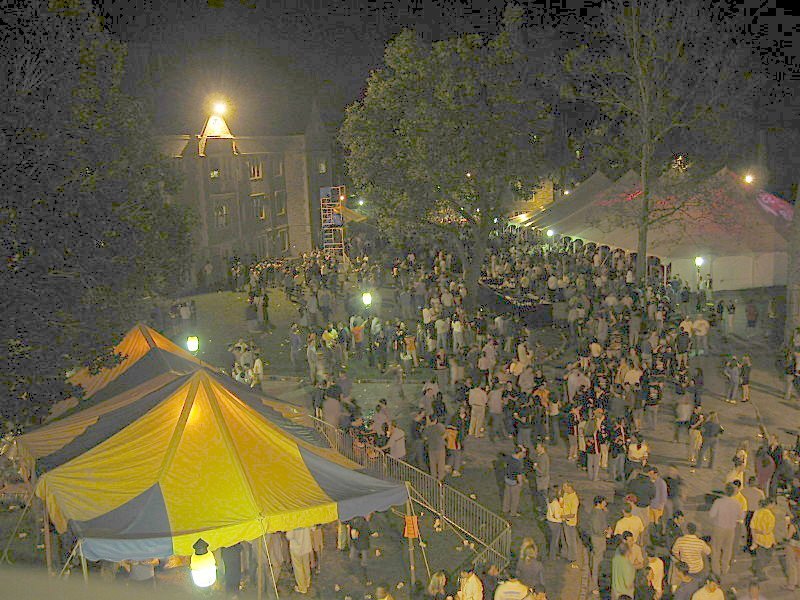
Part of the crowd at the 5th reunion area in 2003.

The Princeton Reunions are an annual college reunion event held every year on the weekend before commencement at Princeton University. Known simply as "Reunions", this event brings back to campus upwards of 25,000 alumni and guests for a four-day celebration featuring large outdoor tents, elaborate costumes, sporting events, alumni and faculty presentations, fireworks, and bands from rock to swing.

== History ==
A Princeton Companion places the advent of Princeton reunions shortly after the end of the Civil War. The 1890s (especially the University's 150th anniversary in 1896) saw increasing interest, although it was not until the 1950s that Reunions took on today's level of organization, particularly with respect to on-campus housing for returning alumni.

== The P-rade ==
The Alumni Parade, known today as the P-rade, is the capstone of the Reunions weekend. Held on Saturday, it is the last major event — save for the fireworks display (introduced in 1996 in celebration of the 250th year since the University's founding.) The 25th Reunion class heads the parade; they are led by the Princeton University Band, which plays traditional songs such as Going Back to Nassau Hall.

The P-rade then proceeds with members of each class from oldest to youngest, accompanied by spouses, children, family members, and even pets. Alumni of the Graduate School normally take the place of the 25th reunion in the sequence. In 2000 and 2001, to celebrate the centennial of the Graduate College, the Graduate School alumni marched immediately behind the 25th Reunion class. Each year, the University president honors the oldest returning alumnus by presenting him with a silver cane donated by the class of 1923. The bearer of that cane from 2002 to 2005 was Leonard Ernst '25, and in 2001 and from 2006 to 2012, the bearer was fellow '25 graduate Malcolm Warnock, who was 107 at his final Reunion appearance in 2012. Ernst, Warnock, and most older alumni are typically chauffeured along the parade route by golf carts, but in 2001, the then-96-year-old Warnock impressed everyone by walking the last segment of the P-rade, waving his cane toward an appreciative crowd. In 2016, cane recipient Joseph Schein '37 (who has since received the cane 6 more times), walked the entire route with the cane at age 101. In 2023, at age 108, Schein once again led the procession (this time via golf cart), receiving the cane as the oldest alumnus in Princeton's history.

Classes celebrating a major reunion (multiples of five—5th, 10th, and so on) often wear themed costumes, which have ranged from Roman legionnaires to firefighters and Uncle Sam lookalikes. Costumes and themes are often completely unrelated to Princeton or the year the class graduated.

Frequently, classes will hire musical groups, such as the Mummers, local high school marching bands, and a calliope, to lead them through the parade.

The P-Rade begins on Nassau Street, enters the campus through FitzRandolph Gate in front of Nassau Hall, then proceeds through Cannon Green. Until the early 1990s, the route continued across McCosh Walk, through 1879 Arch, down Prospect Avenue, and finished on the baseball field. However, because of escalating public liability and insurance costs, the University moved the P-Rade route to stay only on the private property of the University. Some think the University also felt that too many alumni would stop off at their eating clubs on Prospect Avenue before finishing the P-Rade, and so it changed (and shortened) the route so that it does not leave campus. Currently, after crossing Cannon Green, the P-Rade proceeds down Elm Drive through the center of campus, and onto Poe Field. The Classes are arranged on both sides of the entire route, so that each cheers its elders, then falls in line to march past those younger. The P-rade ends as the graduating seniors race onto Poe Field under review of the President of the University, and are then formally welcomed as alumni/ae.

== Closing ceremonies ==
An outdoor orchestra concert and an elaborate evening fireworks display set to music, first held to celebrate the university's 250th anniversary in 1996, but repeated every year since by popular demand, is held the Saturday evening of Reunions. This can be seen as a closing ceremony of Reunions; however, the Reunions parties do not officially end until 2 a.m. that night, and low-key brunches are often held Sunday morning, at which point Reunions Weekend fades into Commencement Weekend.

Unofficially, after the tents close, the party moves to the eating clubs on Prospect Avenue and will go until sunrise, especially Saturday night.

== Trivia ==
- As older classes march by in the P-rade, younger classes greet them by shouting an old, traditional Princeton cheer called a locomotive. The format of the cheer (for the Class of 2008, for example) is "Hip! Hip! Rah! Rah! Rah! Tiger! Tiger! Tiger! Sis! Sis! Sis! Boom! Boom! Boom! Ah! Oh-Eight! Oh-Eight! Oh-Eight!". The older class then traditionally returns the locomotive cheer to the younger class. This is a variant on one of the oldest college cheers, the "Princeton Locomotive," dating to the late 1870s or early 1880s.
- Noted Princeton Reunions participants in 2017 included Jeff Bezos and Ted Cruz.
- Noted Princeton Reunions participants in 2014 included David E. Kelley and William Clay Ford Jr., returning for their 35th Reunion, Donald Rumsfeld, returning for his 60th Reunion, and Bill Frist, returning for his 40th.
- Noted Princeton Reunions participants in 2012 included Brooke Shields, returning for her 25th Reunion.
- Noted Princeton Reunions participants in 2005 included Ralph Nader, returning for his 50th Reunion.
- Each senior class designs and distributes a decorated (and often personalized) canvas "beer jacket." Beer jackets are so named because they were originally worn to protect the wearers' clothing from beer. Since 2002, the administration has renamed these as "Class Jackets" for politically correct reasons, but students continue to refer to them as "beer jackets." Modern incarnations are also designed with voluminous inner pockets to conceal and carry beer cans. The jackets also serve to distinguish seniors from other underclassmen, a custom that dates to the days when seniors were afforded special privileges.
- For the 5th, 10th, 15th and 20th Reunions, each class designs a new costume. Over the years, costumes have included cowboys, tigers, astronauts, toreadors, soldiers, mountain-climbers, clowns, sailors, ANZACs, beetles, chefs, firemen, pirates, toga-clad Romans, and a 50-person-long "centipede."
- At the 25th Reunion (which marches at the front of the P-rade, immediately following the University leadership and the Princeton University Band), class members receive class blazers. These range from blue blazers with a class logo to various variants of orange-and-black stripes (including a noted striped jacket worn by the parent/grandparent classes of 1933, 1958 and 1983), or various custom designs with class numerals, names of classmates and other icons.
- In 2005, there were 74 classes in the P-rade, beginning with the Class of 1925.
- In 2012, the Class of 1925 was once again the oldest class represented, with Malcolm Warnock '25, age 107, the recipient of the "Class of 1923 Cane" awarded to the oldest alumnus from the oldest returning class. Warnock returned for many Reunions, becoming the first person to participate in the P-Rade at his 84th, 85th, and 86th Reunions.
