= Tracking (hunting) =

Observing animal tracks to better understand the animal and environment

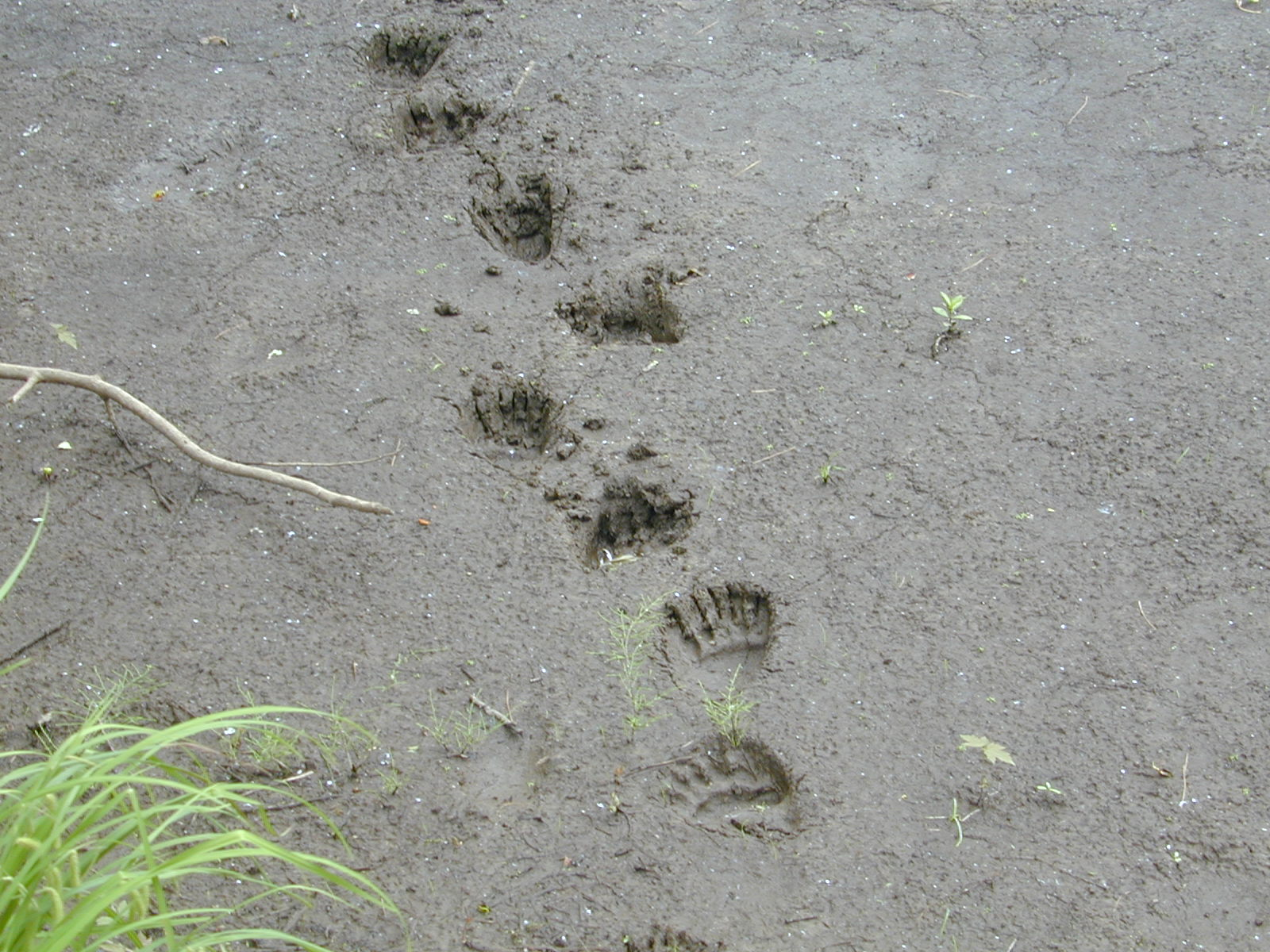
Bear tracks in Superior National Forest

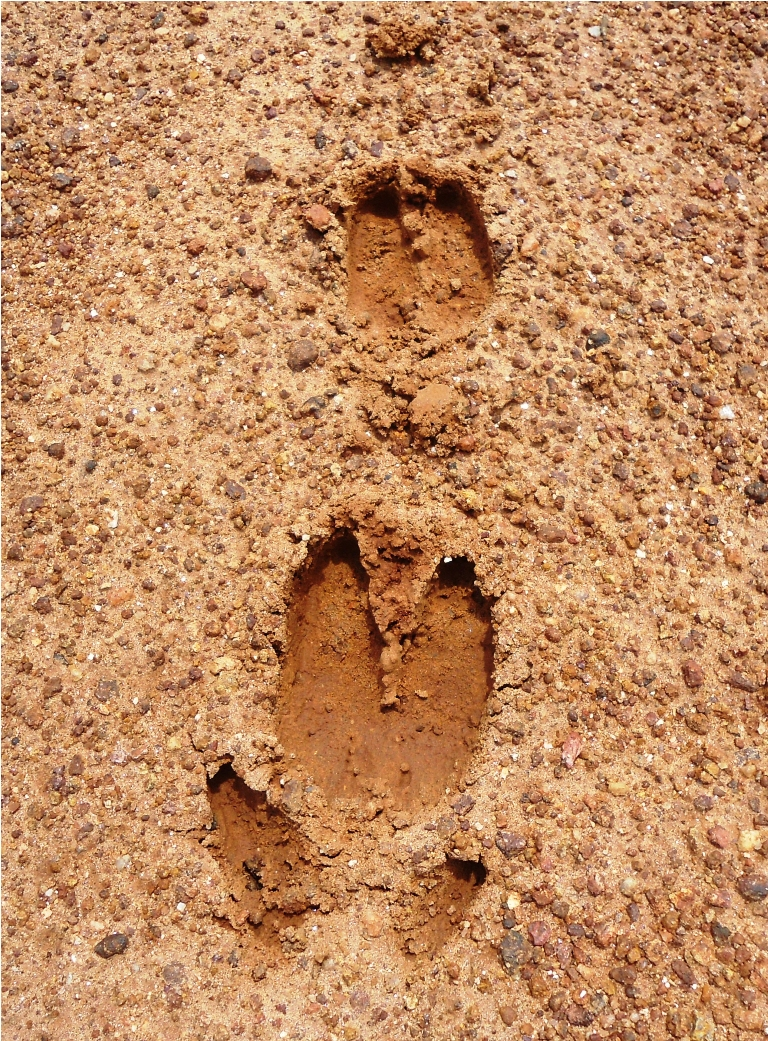
Deer tracks

Tracking in hunting and ecology is the science and art of observing animal tracks and other signs, with the goal of gaining understanding of the landscape and the animal being tracked (the "quarry"). A further goal of tracking is the deeper understanding of the systems and patterns that make up the environment surrounding and incorporating the tracker.

The practice of tracking may focus on, but is not limited to, the patterns and systems of the local animal life and ecology. Trackers must be able to recognize and follow animals through their tracks, signs, and trails, also known as spoor. Spoor may include tracks, scat, feathers, kills, scratching posts, trails, drag marks, sounds, scents, marking posts, feeding signs, the behavior of other animals, habitat cues, and any other clues about the identity and whereabouts of the quarry.

The skilled tracker is able to discern these clues, recreate what transpired on the landscape, and make predictions about the quarry. The tracker may attempt to predict the current location of the quarry and follow the quarry's spoor to that location, in an activity known as trailing.

Prehistoric hunters used tracking principally to gather food. Even in historic times, tracking has been traditionally practiced by the majority of tribal people all across the world. The military and intelligence agencies also use tracking to find enemy combatants in the bush, land, sea, and desert.

== Tracking as an art and science ==
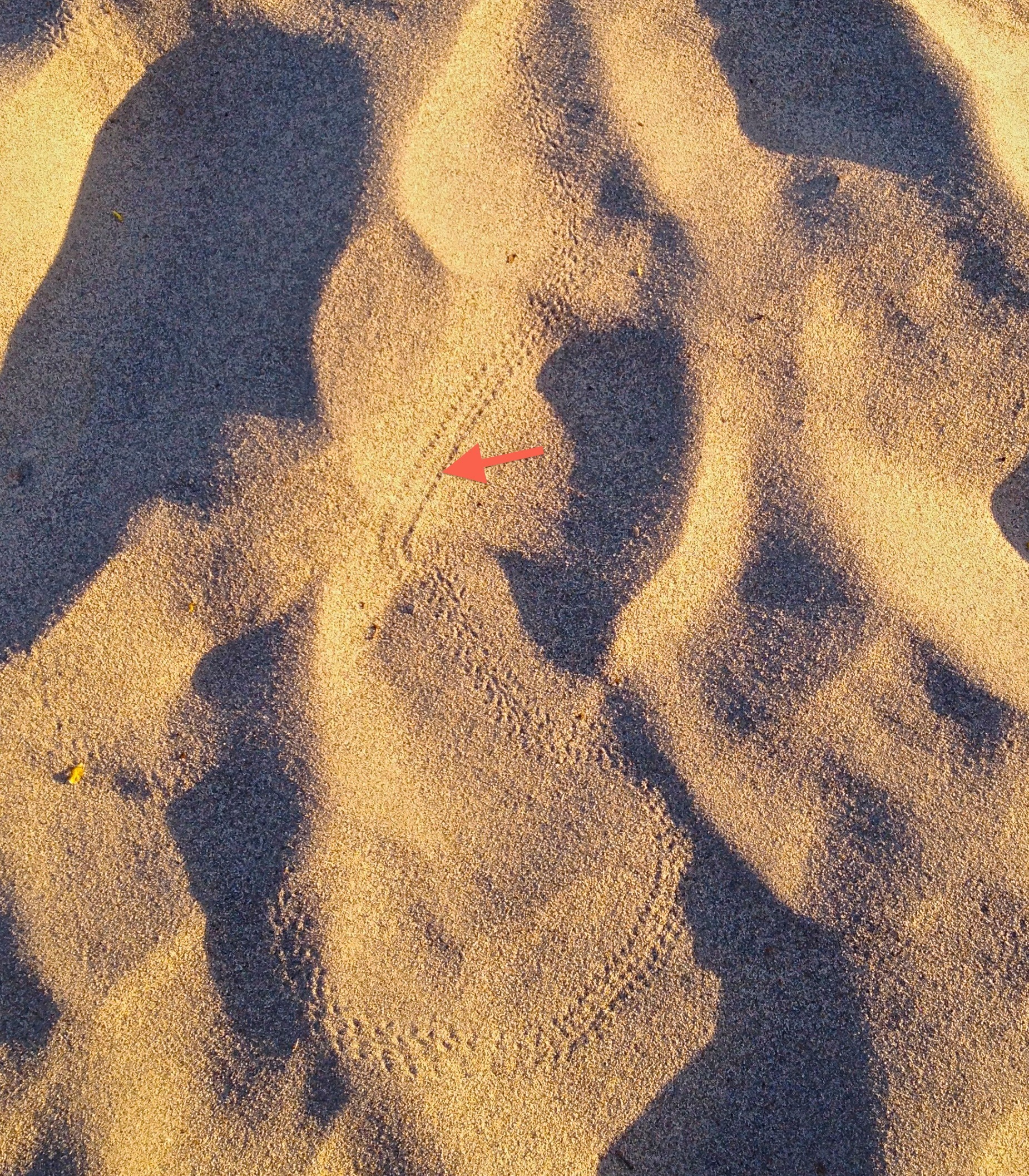
Snake trail on sand dune

It has been suggested that the art of tracking may have been the first implementation of science, practiced by hunter-gatherers since the evolution of modern humans.

Apart from knowledge based on direct observations of animals, trackers gain a detailed understanding of animal behavior through the interpretation of tracks and signs. In this way much information can be obtained that would otherwise remain unknown, especially on the behavior of rare or nocturnal animals that are not often seen.

Tracks and signs offer information on undisturbed, natural behavior, while direct observations often influence the animal by the mere presence of the observer. Tracking is therefore a non-invasive method of information gathering, in which potential stress caused to animals can be minimized.

Some of the most important applications of tracking are in hunting and trapping, as well as controlling poaching, ecotourism, environmental education, police investigation, search and rescue, and in scientific research.

The modern science of animal tracking is widely practiced in the fields of wildlife biology, zoology, mammalogy, conservation, and wildlife management. Tracking enables the detection of rare, endangered, and elusive species. The science of tracking is utilized in the study of forest carnivores like the Canada lynx (Felis lynx) and the wolverine (Gulo gulo). Various measurements of tracks, and/or an animal's paws, and subsequent analyses of the datum, can also reveal important information about animals' physiology and their behavior. For example, measurements of lynx paws demonstrate their support capacity (on snow) to be double that of the bobcat.

== Recognition of signs ==
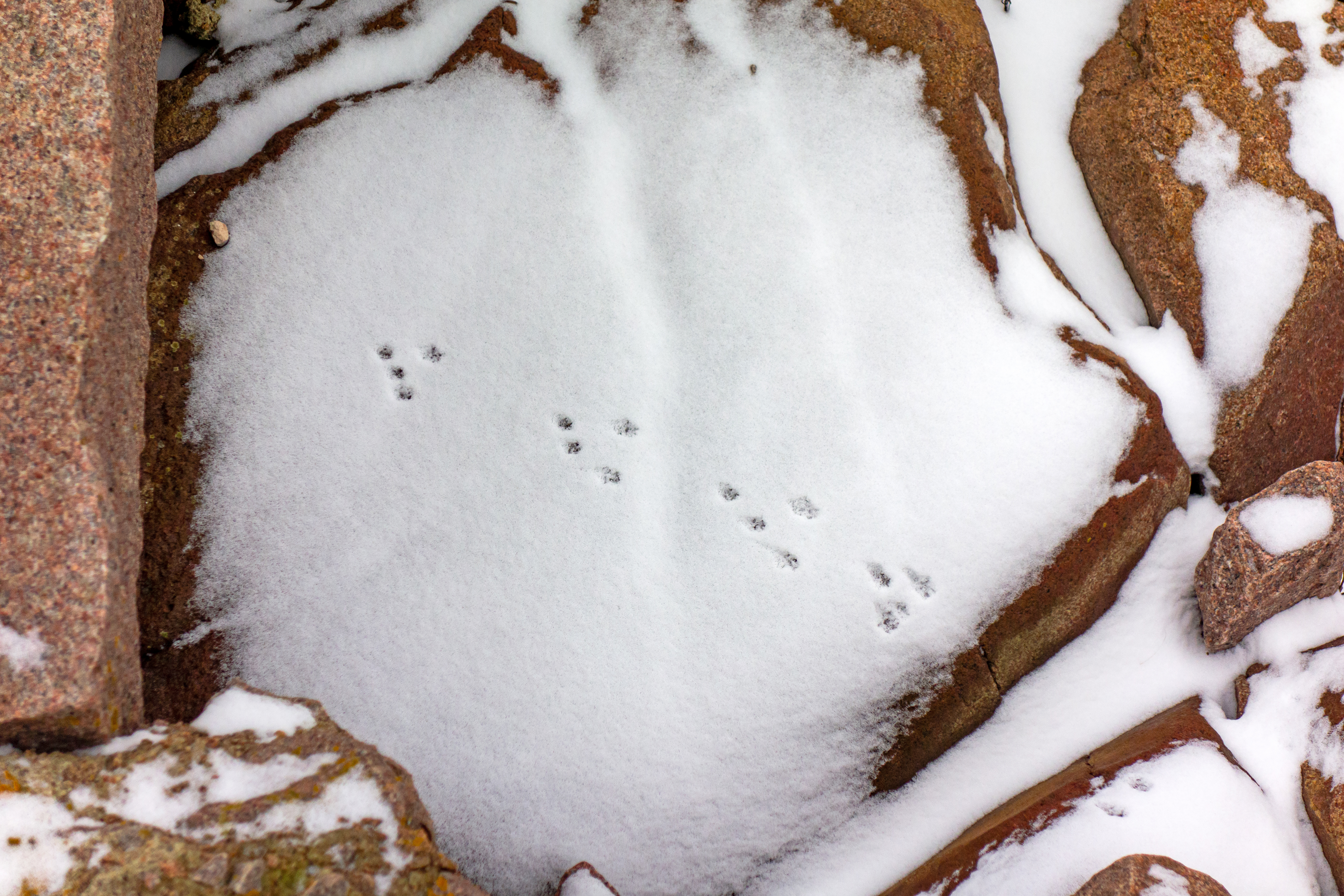
Squirrel tracks in snow at Loddebo, Lysekil

In order to recognize a specific sign, a tracker often has a preconceived image of what a typical sign looks like. Without preconceived images many signs may be overlooked. However, with a preconceived image of a specific animal's spoor in mind, trackers will tend to 'recognize' spoor in markings made by another animal, or even in random markings. Their mind will be prejudiced to see what they want to see, and in order to avoid making such errors they must be careful not to reach decisions too soon. Decisions made at a glance can often be erroneous, so when encountering new signs, trackers take their time to study signs in detail. While preconceived images may help in recognizing signs, the tracker must, however, avoid the preconditioned tendency to look for one set of things in the environment to the exclusion of all others.

Trackers will always try to identify the trail positively by some distinguishing mark or mannerism in order not to lose it in any similar spoor. They will look for such features in the footprints as well as for an individual manner of walking. Often hoofs of antelope are broken or have chipped edges, or when the animal is walking it may leave a characteristic scuff mark. Experienced trackers will memorise a spoor and be able to distinguish that individual animal's spoor from others. When following a spoor, trackers will walk next to it, not on it, taking care not to spoil the trail so that it can easily be found again if the spoor is lost.

The shadows cast by ridges in the spoor show up best if the spoor is kept between the tracker and the sun. With the sun shining from behind the spoor, the shadows cast by small ridges and indentations in the spoor will be clearly visible. With the sun behind the tracker, however, these shadows will be hidden by the ridges that cast them. Tracking is easiest in the morning and late afternoon, as the shadows cast by the ridges in the spoor are longer and stand out better than at or near midday. As the sun moves higher in the sky, the shadows grow shorter. At midday the spoor may cast no shadows at all, making them difficult to see in the glare of the sunlight.

Trackers will never look down at their feet if they can help it, since this will slow them down. By looking up, well ahead of themselves, approximately five to ten meters (15–30 feet) depending on the terrain, they are able to track much faster and with more ease. Unless they need to study the spoor more closely, it is not necessary to examine every sign. If they see a sign ten meters ahead, those in between can be ignored while they look for spoor further on. Over difficult terrain it may not be possible to see signs well ahead, so trackers will have to look at the ground in front of them and move more slowly.

Trackers must also avoid concentrating all their attention on the tracks, thereby ignoring everything around them. Tracking requires varying attention, a constant refocusing between minute details of the track and the whole pattern of the environment.

== Anticipation and prediction ==
Although in principle it is possible to follow a trail by simply looking for one sign after the other, this may prove so time-consuming that the tracker will never catch up with the quarry. Instead, trackers place themselves in the position of their quarry in order to anticipate the route it may have taken. They will thereby be able to decide in advance where they can expect to find signs and thus not waste time looking for them.

Trackers will often look for spoor in obvious places such as openings between bushes, where the animal would most likely have moved. In thick bushes they will look for the most accessible thruways. Where the spoor crosses an open clearing, they will look in the general direction for access ways on the other side of the clearing. If the animal was moving from shade to shade, they will look for spoor in the shade ahead. If their quarry has consistently moved in a general direction, it may be possible to follow the most likely route by focusing on the terrain, and to look for signs of spoor only occasionally. They must, however, always be alert for an abrupt change in direction.

Animals usually make use of a network of paths to move from one locality to another. If it is clear that an animal was using a particular path, this can simply be followed up to the point where it forks, or to where the animal has left the path. Where one of several paths may have been used, trackers must of course determine which path that specific animal used. This may not always be easy, since many animals often use the same paths.

In areas of high animal densities that have much-used animal paths which interlink, it may seem impossible to follow tracks. However, once tracks have been located on an animal path, it is often possible for a tracker to follow the path even though no further tracks are seen. By looking to either side of the path, the tracker can establish if the animal has moved away from the path, and then follow the new trail.

In difficult terrain, where signs are sparse, trackers may have to rely extensively on anticipating the animal's movements. In order to move fast enough to overtake the animal, one may not be able to detect all the signs. Trackers sometimes identify themselves with the animal to such an extent that they follow an imaginary route which they think the animal would most likely have taken, only confirming their expectations with occasional signs.

When trackers come to hard, stony ground, where tracks are virtually impossible to discern, apart from the odd small pebble that has been overturned, they may move around the patch of hard ground in order to find the spoor in softer ground.

When the trackers lose the spoor, they first search obvious places for signs, choosing several likely access ways through the bush in the general direction of movement. When several trackers work together, they can simply fan out and quarter the ground until one of them finds it. An experienced tracker may be able to predict more or less where the animal was going, and will not waste time in one spot looking for signs, but rather look for it further ahead.

Knowledge of the terrain and animal behavior allows trackers to save valuable time by predicting the animal's movements. Once the general direction of movement is established and it is known that an animal path, river or any other natural boundary lies ahead, they can leave the spoor and move to these places, cutting across the trail by sweeping back and forth across the predicted direction in order to pick up tracks a considerable distance ahead.

To be able to anticipate and predict the movements of an animal, trackers must know the animal and its environment so well that they can identify themselves with that animal. They must be able to visualize how the animal was moving around, and place themselves in its position. If the animal was moving in a straight line at a steady pace, and it is known that there is a waterhole or a pan further ahead, trackers should leave the spoor to look for signs of it at the waterhole or pan. While feeding, an animal will usually move into the wind, going from one bush to another. If the trackers know the animal's favored food, and know moreover how they generally move, they need not follow its zigzag path, but leave the spoor at places, moving in a straight course to save time, and pick up the spoor further on.

Since signs may be fractional or partly obliterated, it may not always be possible to make a complete reconstruction of the animal's movements and activities on the basis of spoor evidence alone. Trackers may therefore have to create a working hypothesis in which spoor evidence is supplemented with hypothetical assumptions based not only on their knowledge of animal behavior, but also on their creative ability to solve new problems and discover new information. The working hypothesis is often a reconstruction of what the animal was doing, how fast it was moving, when it was there, where it was going to and where it might be at that time. Such a working hypothesis enables the trackers to predict the animal's movements. As new information is gathered, they may have to revise their working hypothesis, creating a better reconstruction of the animal's activities. Anticipating and predicting an animal's movements, therefore, involves a continuous process of problem-solving, creating new hypotheses and discovering new information.

== Stealth ==
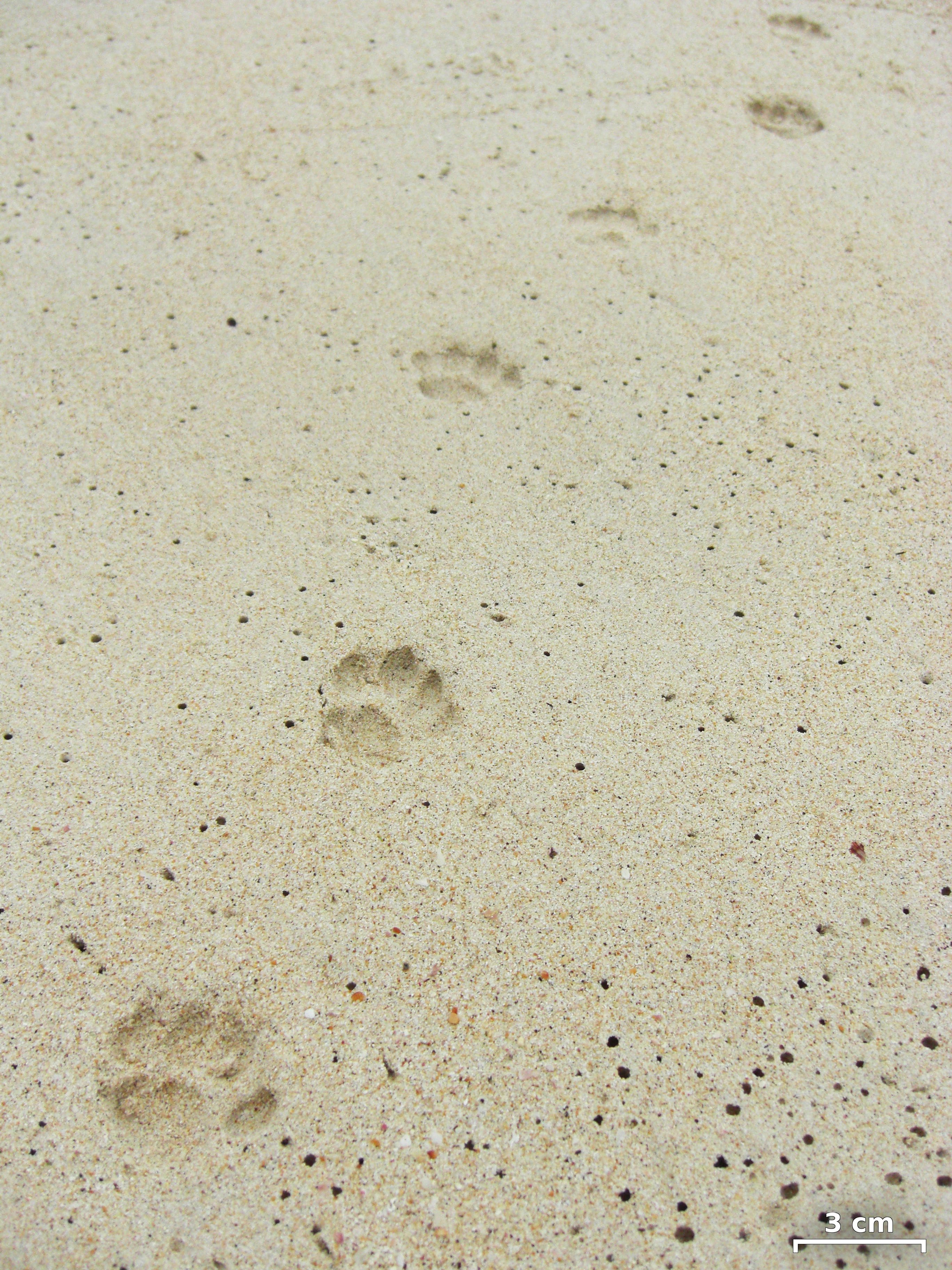
feral cat tracks

In order to come close to an animal, trackers must remain undetected not only by the animal, but also by other animals that may alert it. Moving as quietly as possible, trackers will avoid stepping on dry leaves and twigs, and take great care when moving through dry grass.

If the trackers are in close proximity to the animal, it is important that they remain downwind of it, that is, in a position where the wind is blowing away from the animal in the direction of the tracker. They must never be in a position where their scent could be carried in the wind towards the animal and thereby alert it. It is also important that the animal does not have the opportunity to cross their tracks, since the lingering human scent will alert it. Most animals prefer to keep the wind in their faces when traveling so that they can scent danger ahead of them. Trackers will therefore usually be downwind from them as they approach the animals from behind. The wind direction may, however, have changed. If the wind direction is unfavorable, the trackers may have to leave the spoor to search for their quarry from the downwind side.

As the trackers get closer to the animal, they must make sure that they see it before it sees them. Some trackers maintain that an animal keeps looking back down its own trail, always on the alert for danger coming from behind. When the spoor is very fresh, trackers may have to leave the spoor so that the animal does not see them first. Animals usually rest facing downwind, so that they can see danger approaching from the downwind side, while they can smell danger coming from behind them. An animal may also double back on its spoor and circle downwind before settling down to rest. A predator following its trail will move past the resting animal on the upwind side before realizing that the animal had doubled back, and the resting animal will smell the predator in time to make its escape.

When stalking an animal, trackers use the cover of bushes, going down on their hands and knees where necessary. In long grass they go down on their stomachs pulling themselves forward with their elbows. The most important thing is not to attract attention by sudden movements. Trackers take their time, moving slowly when the animal is not looking, and keeping still when the animal is looking in their direction. When stalking an animal, trackers must also be careful not to disturb other animals. A disturbed animal will give its alarm signal, thereby alerting all animals in the vicinity, including the animal being tracked down.

== See also ==
- Hunter-gatherer
- Ian Maxwell (tracker)
- Shadow Wolves
- Songlines
- Tom Brown Jr.
- Tracking (dog), the action of a dog following a scent trail.
