= John Maxwell (writer) =

American dramatist

- Born: July 12, 1944 (age 82); Pickens, Mississippi, U.S.
- Occupations: Stage actor, writer

John Maxwell (born July 12, 1944) is a writer and performer from Jackson, Mississippi.

== Career ==
Maxwell is best known for his portrayal of William Faulkner in Oh, Mr. Faulkner, Do You Write?, a one-man theatrical piece co-written with Tom Dupree. Maxwell has performed this play steadily since its world premiere at Jackson's New Stage Theatre in 1981. It appeared as a film, directed by Jimbo Barnett, in 2006, and was released on DVD in 2008.

Maxwell spoke at the May 1, 2005, rededication of Rowan Oak, William Faulkner's home in Oxford, Mississippi, which is operated as a museum by the University of Mississippi.

In 2006, he received the "Best Actor" Award at the Atlanta Film Festival for Oh, Mr Faulkner, Do You Write?.

== Filmography ==
=== Film ===
Year	Title	Role	Notes
2001	The Rising Place	Funeral Director	
2006	Oh, Mr. Faulkner, Do You Write?	William Faulkner	Also writer
2021	Texas Red	Coochie	

=== Television ===
Year	Title	Role	Notes
1994	Northern Exposure	Senator Monkton	Episode: "Sons of the Tundra"
2004	Infidelity	Hank Montet	Television film
2004	The Brooke Ellison Story	Professor #2	Television film
