= James Laidlaw Maxwell Jr =

English missionary

James Laidlaw Maxwell Jr. (Chinese: 馬雅各二世, 1876 – 12 August 1951) was a pioneering modern English Presbyterian medical missionary to Formosa (Taiwan) and China. He was the son of James Laidlaw Maxwell Sr.

Maxwell worked in the Sin-lâu Hospital in Tainan, which his father ran from 1900 to 1923. In 1923, he was appointed secretary of the China Medical Missionary Association. He died of malaria in Hangzhou in 1951.
