= Ian Maxwell (tracker) =

Zambian tracker

Ian Maxwell FRGS is a Zambian tracker who tracks wildlife and humans in deserts and jungles. He is a Fellow of the Royal Geographical Society. He was awarded the Winston Churchill Fellowship for life for his work in conservation, and he wrote "Manhunter. The Art of Tracking" and Animal Tracks ID and Techniques. He received a medal from the Queen at Buckingham Place for Tracking and Conservation of Big Cats.

He has presented Big Cat Track on Animal Planet and Maxs Big Tracks on Discovery Animal Planet on TV. He is a public speaker and operates a tracking school in the UK called Shadowhawk. He is a specialist in the art of detection. Appeared in BBC One Show as an expert tracker. TV Appearances BBC1: The One Show. CBBC: Beat The Boss. BBC2: James May Manlab. BBC2: Long Way Down. Ewan Mcgregor. Discovery: Maxs Big Tracks.7x 1 hour programs tracking the most elusive animals in the world. Discovery/ Animal Planet: Big Cat Track. Animal Planet: Geoff Corwins Quest. Chanel 5:How To Survive A Disaster Movie. Zambezi. The recreation of David Livingstone's 1864 ascent of the Zambezi. Starts in Indian Ocean and travels up the Zambezi to Livingston via Mary Livingstone's lonely grave on the banks and many historical forts of the Zulu. Advisor to ITV Wild At Heart.
