= Gilbert Maxwell =

American poet

- Writing career
- Genre: Poetry

Gilbert Maxwell (February 13, 1910-November 1979) was a poet, New York actor, and author.

== Books ==
Gilbert, who was a friend of Tennessee Williams, wrote several books, including Tennessee Williams and Friends: an Informal Biography (1965) and Helen Morgan: Her Life and Legend New York: Hawthorn Books. ISBN 0-8015-4526-9.. (1974).

== Poetry ==
Maxwell published poetry in Poetry magazine between 1933 and 1937. These included his poems Mortality, Boy and Hawk, Farewell, From a Piazza in the South, Symbol for Static Grief, and Forfeits.

Transcripts of his poems are located in the archives of the University of Florida.

== Final years ==
Gilbert spent his final years in Florida and died in North Miami Beach, Florida, in November 1979.

== Bibliography ==
- Look to the Lightning. New York: Dodd, Mead & Co., 1933. (Poetry)
- Stranger's Garment. New York: Dodd, Mead & Co., 1936. (Poetry)
- The Dark Rain Falling. Prairie City, IL: Press of James A. Decker, 1942. (Poetry)
- The Sleeping Trees. Boston: Little, Brown & Co., 1949. (Fiction)
- Go Looking: Poems, 1933-1953. Boston: Bruce Humphries, 1954. (Poetry)
- Tennessee Williams and Friends. New York: The World Publishing Company, 1965. (Biography).
- Helen Morgan: Her Life and Legend. New York: Hawthorn Books, 1974. (Biography)
