= Chris Maxwell =

Chris Maxwell may refer to:

- Chris Maxwell (jurist), Australian jurist
- Chris Maxwell (footballer) (born 1990), Welsh football goalkeeper
