= Jimmy Maxwell (rugby union) =

- Full name: James MacMillan Maxwell
- Born: 30 April 1931 Langholm, Scotland
- Died: 28 August 2017 (aged 86) Longtown, England

Rugby union career
- Position: Stand-off
International career
Years	Team	Apps	(Points)
1957	Scotland	1	(0)

James MacMillan Maxwell (30 April 1931 — 28 August 2017) was a Scottish international rugby union player.

Born in Langholm, Maxwell attended Langholm Academy until the age of 14, when he became an apprentice plasterer at his father's company. He served with the Royal Air Force (RAF) during his national service.

Maxwell, a stand-off, was an attacking runner rather than a kicker and spent his rugby entire career with hometown club Langholm RFC. He made 21 representative appearances for South of Scotland and was capped once for Scotland, against Ireland at Murrayfield in the 1957 Five Nations. Due to heavy snow, Maxwell was unable to play to his strength and 20 minutes into the match switched position with centre Tommy McClung, who possessed a kicking game. He captained Langholm to both the Border League and Scottish Championship in the 1958–59 season.

== See also ==
- List of Scotland national rugby union players
