= David Maxwell =

David Maxwell may refer to:

- David Maxwell (academic) (born 1944), president of Drake University in Des Moines, Iowa
- David Maxwell (historian) (born 1963), Dixie Professor of Ecclesiastical History at Cambridge University
- David Maxwell (musician) (1943–2015), American blues pianist
- David Maxwell (American politician) (1943–2024), Iowa state representative
- David Maxwell (Irish politician) (born 1965)
- David Maxwell (rower) (1951–2023), British rower
- David Maxwell (printer), English printer
- David Farrow Maxwell (1900–1985), president of the American Bar Association

== See also ==
- David Maxwell Fyfe, 1st Earl of Kilmuir (1900–1967), British Conservative politician, lawyer and judge
