= John Hall Maxwell =

Scottish agriculturist

John Hall Maxwell of Dargavel CB FRSE (1812–1866) was a Scottish agriculturist.

== Life ==
Maxwell was born on 20 February 1812, at 19 Queen Street in Glasgow the eldest son of William Maxwell of Dargavel, Renfrewshire (d.1847), and his wife, Mary Campbell, eldest daughter of John Campbell of Possil, near Glasgow. He was apprenticed as a lawyer but does not appear to have had any university education.

He was called to the Scottish bar as an advocate in 1835.

He practised his profession until 1845, when he succeeded Sir Charles Gordon of Grimkin as secretary to the Highland Agricultural Society. At this time the number of members was 2,620, and the funds of the society amounted to £34,000; when he retired there were 4,200 members, and the finances had risen to £50,000. The annual shows under his management displayed improvements, and Maxwell paid attention to the collection of agricultural statistics.

In 1848 he was elected a Fellow of the Royal Society of Edinburgh his proposer being Sir John Macneill. On 5 February 1856 he was created a Commander of the Order of the Bath (CB).

On his own estate at Dargavel, Maxwell carried out costly improvements, especially in the reclamation of waste land.

He died at his residence, Torr Hall, near Paisley, on 25 August 1866. He is buried at Erskine Old Parish Church.

== Family ==
On 3 August 1843 he married Eliza Anne Margaret Williams (d.1907), the eldest daughter of Thomas Williams of Southwick Crescent, Hyde Park, London.
