= Charles Maxwell =

Charles Maxwell may refer to:

- Charles William Maxwell (1775–1848), British soldier and colonial administrator
- Charles Maxwell (radio producer) (1910–1998), British radio producer
- Charles Maxwell (actor) (1913–1993), American character actor and television producer
- Charlie Maxwell (1927–2024), American baseball player
