= South Wales cricket team =

A South Wales cricket team played only one first-class match. This was in 1912, against the touring South Africans at Swansea. The tourists won the game by 230 runs. There were other matches between South Wales and touring teams but these were not classified as first-class matches. There were also a few South Wales v North Wales matches.

Previously there had been the South Wales Cricket Club which was formed in 1859 but lasted only until 1886. Some leading players from the West Country played for the club, including W. G. Grace in a match against the Gentlemen of Sussex in July 1864.

== See also ==
- Wales cricket team
