= Reginald Maxwell =

Reginald Maxwell may refer to:

- Sir Reginald Maxwell (civil servant) (1882–1967), British administrator in India
- Reginald Maxwell (RAF officer) (1894–1960), British flying ace during World War I
