= Joseph Edward Maxwell =

American politician

Joseph Edward Maxwell (November 14, 1802 – March 8, 1886) was a Georgia politician.

Maxwell was born in Liberty County, Georgia, November 14, 1802; his ancestors (from Maxwellton, Dumfries, Scotland) had settled in that county in 1748.

He graduated from Yale College in 1823. He studied law, and was admitted to the bar of his native State, but inherited wealth relieved him from the necessity of practicing his profession. In 1826 he married Sarah Martha Holmes, of Liberty County, who survived him, with five children. Modest and retiring, he sought no public position, and only held office for a single term as the representative of his native county in the Georgia Legislature. During his later years he resided with a married daughter, near Grovetown, Georgia, and there he died, very suddenly, while resting after his return from his usual midday walk, March 8, 1886, in his 84th year.

This article incorporates public domain material from the 1886 Yale Obituary Record.
