= Old Nassau =

Alma mater of Princeton University

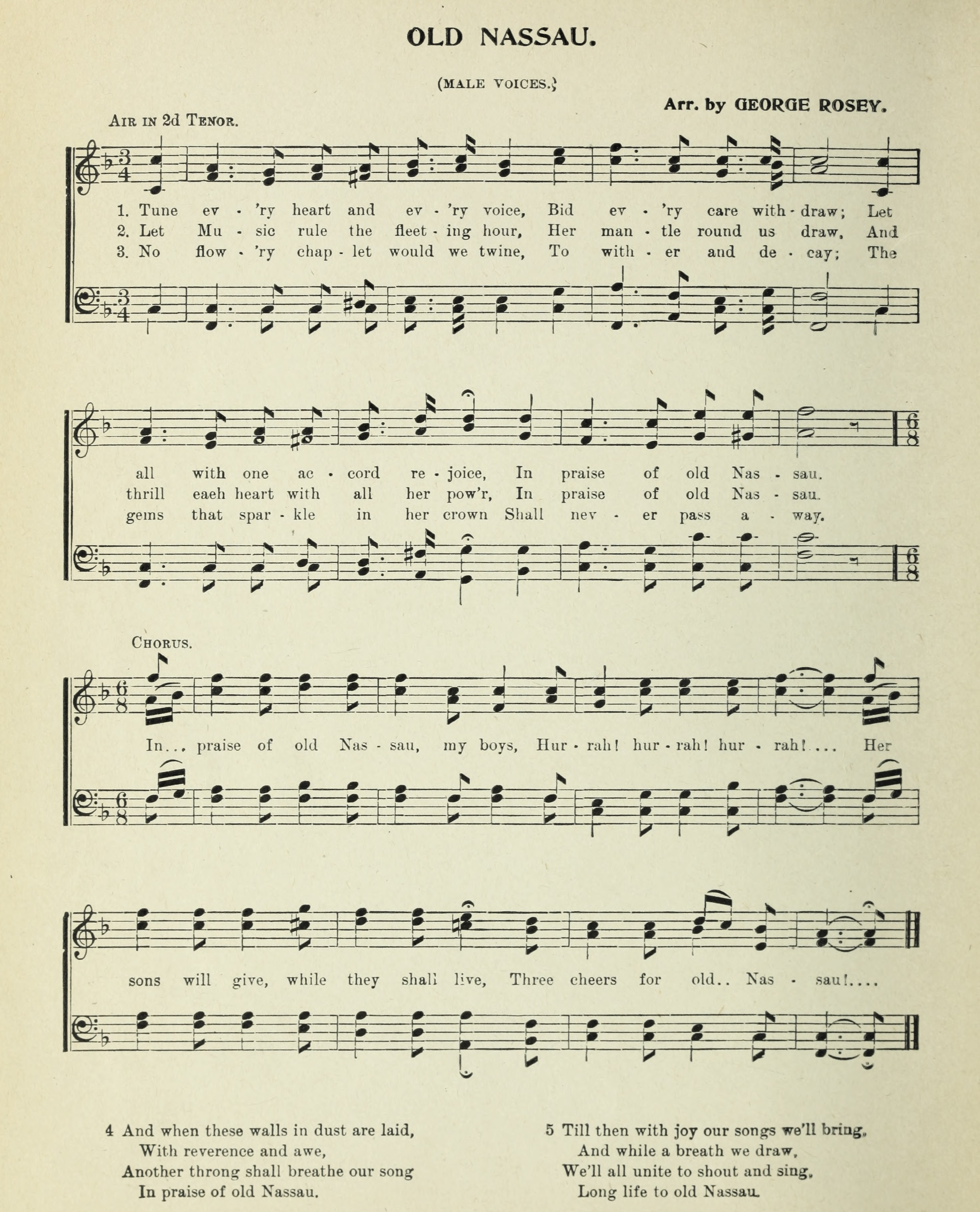
- 1909 sheet music

Song
- Published: April 1859
- Genre: Alma mater
- Composer: Carl A. Langlotz
- Lyricist: Harlan Page Peck

Audio sample
- 52 second a cappella version: file; help

"Old Nassau" has been Princeton University's alma mater (school song) since 1859. Harlan Page Peck was the lyricist and Carl A. Langlotz (sometimes Karl Langlotz) was the composer. The lyrics were changed in 1987 to address sexism at the newly co-educational institution. For a brief time the song was sung to the melody of "Auld Lang Syne" before Langlotz wrote the music on demand. The lyrics were the result of a songwriting contest by the Nassau Literary Review.

== Composition ==
Freshman student Peck penned the words that year and published it in the March 1859 issue of the Nassau Literary Review, which is the oldest student publication at Princeton and also the second oldest undergraduate literary magazine in the country. The winter 1858–59 issue of the magazine had offered a prize for a college song and Peck won. Peck would go on to pen both the Class of 1862 ode and the Class of 1862 poem. Later in Spring 1859, German teacher Langlotz composed music for the song. The song has four verses of lyrics and a refrain.

The lyrics were originally sung to the melody of "Auld Lang Syne", but William C. Stitt (Class of 1857), a student at the Princeton Theological Seminary found this arrangement unsuitable. He sought out Langlotz and stood over him until he composed more suitable music. The song and its lyrics then appeared in Songs of Old Nassau, the first Princeton songbook, Spring 1859.

According to Langlotz' autobiography

During the winter and spring of the year 1859, some of the seniors and tutors use to meet with me in a little old house on Williams Street, just east of the college grounds, where we use to smoke and sing college songs over our glass of beer. When 'Old Nassau' was written, we tried to sing it to the air of 'Auld Lang Syne', but found this utterly unsuitable. Mr. William C. Stitt ['56], one of the company,...suggested that I should write original music to the words...my memory was strengthened from day to day by Stitt who requested it for tomorrow...there I was sitting on my front porch smoking my peaceful pipe, when energetic Stitt arrived on the scene, and asked me in an off-hand way if I had anything particular to do that afternoon. I answered 'No'. Immediately he produced pencil and music paper saying 'Here is Old Nassau. Now do as you promised and put it the music to it.' I did write the music then and there, with Stitt standing guard over me.

— Carl A. Langlotz,

== Lyric change ==
The first women were admitted to Princeton in the late 1960s and the song was considered sexist by 1987, when Princeton had reached 35% female enrollment. Some such as Daily Princetonian journalist Jack Goodman question whether changing the lyrics of the Princeton alma mater would serve any real purpose. The impetus to change the lyrics came in late 1986 from Janet Sarbanes, daughter of United States Senator Paul Sarbanes. Sophomore Class of 1989 President David Littell helped lead the petition to gain 500 signatures for a referendum on the issue. A Princeton alum lyricist was consulted to for suggested revisions.

In December 1986, the student council voted in strong support of revising the song. In late February 1987, the student body rejected the revision by an 872 to 794 margin, but the vote was not considered to represent a quorum. As a result of insufficient opposition in the voting and inconclusive forums and polls, the revision was referred to the office of the president and board of trustees.

The following week, Princeton President William G. Bowen noted that "Old Nassau was written to be inclusive for the Princeton of its day," going on to say "These changes in lyrics allow it to be more inclusive for today's Princeton." The refrain was changed from "In praise of Old Nassau, my boys, hurrah, hurrah, hurrah! Her sons will give while they shall live, three cheers for Old Nassau." to "In praise of Old Nassau, we sing, hurrah, hurrah, hurrah! Our hearts will give, while we shall live, three cheers for Old Nassau." The Princeton board of trustees, student government and alumni council all ratified the revision.

Other universities followed Princeton's lead. Dartmouth endured controversial change to "Dear Old Dartmouth" in 1988, University of Chicago held a competition for an entirely new alma mater during the 1990–91 school year, due to the original song's sexist content. Harvard made lyric adjustments to "Fair Harvard" in the late 1990s.
