= Robert Sidney Maxwell =

American historian

- Born: November 11, 1911; Danville, Kentucky, US
- Died: December 29, 1990 (aged 79); Nacogdoches, Texas, US
- Spouse: Margaret Dunning

Academic background
- Education: Kentucky Wesleyan College (BA); University of Cincinnati (MA); University of Wisconsin (PhD)
- Thesis: Maxwell's dissertation was the basis for his book on LaFollette
- Doctoral advisor: Merle Curti

Academic work
- Discipline: History
- Sub-discipline: American history, Texas history
- Institutions: University of Wisconsin; University of Kentucky; Stephen F. Austin State College; United States Army
- Main interests: American history, Texas history
- Notable works: Whistle in the Piney Woods (1963)

Robert Sidney Maxwell (November 11, 1911 – December 29, 1990) was an American historian.

== Early life ==
Robert Sidney Maxwell was born in Danville, Kentucky on November 11, 1911, to William Samuel Maxwell and Ida Maxwell. The Handbook of Texas Online claims a birth date of November 26, 1911.

His middle name was a reference to Albert Sidney Johnston, a Confederate States of America commander. William Maxwell was a Methodist minister and moved frequently to lead different congregations. Despite living in several different cities in Kentucky, the family persisted long enough in Fort Thomas, Kentucky to allow Maxwell a full four years at Highlands High School. He lettered in three sports, acted in the theater, joined several social clubs, and studied the Bible.

== Career ==
Maxwell first attended Kentucky Wesleyan College in 1930, where he majored in history and chemistry. He played center on the school basketball team and graduated in 1934. He enrolled at the University of Cincinnati as a graduate student and earned his master's degree in 1937. Next he taught high school and coached basketball in Alexandria, Kentucky.

Maxwell joined the US Army after 1941. Trained as a company commander, he entered World War II after the Normandy Invasion. He was stationed in the Netherlands and Belgium. He became a captain.

Upon returning from Europe, Maxwell was accepted into a doctoral program at the University of Wisconsin–Madison. With Merle Curti as a doctoral advisor, Maxwell embarked on a biography of Robert M. La Follette. He attended classes, and researched and taught history from 1946 through 1949. After completing his PhD in 1949, he joined the University of Kentucky history faculty, where he taught twentieth-century history until 1952. That fall, he accepted a position as assistant professor at Stephen F. Austin State College.

Maxwell developed new research interests after arriving to the campus in Nacogdoches, Texas. He was already a published book author. The State Historical Society of Wisconsin published La Follette and the Rise of Progressives in Wisconsin in 1956 and Emanuel L. Philipp: Wisconsin Stalwart in 1859. However, at Stephen F. Austin, he developed an interest in the history of lumber and railroads. In addition to associate professor at the university, Maxwell was director of the Bureau of East Texas Research. Acting in this role. he traveled all over East Texas tracking down archives and conducting interviews with officials of lumber and railroad companies. During this period, he also represented Stephen F. Austin at the conventions for the Mississippi Valley Historical Association, Southern Historical Association, and the Texas State Historical Association.

Starting in the fall of 1960, Maxwell was the visiting Fulbright Scholar at the University of Southampton. He taught three classes in American history there and also gave a traveling tour of guest lectures in England and Germany. He briefly served as interim chair of the history department when he returned to Stephen F. Austin. Several years later, in 1969, Maxwell accepted the position as chair of the history department, this time as a permanent replacement for C.K. Chamberlain.

Throughout the 1960s, Maxwell continued pioneering research on the Texas lumber and railroad industries. Maxwell said of their relationship, "The history of the railroad and of the lumber industry are inseparable." In 1963, the Texas Gulf Coast Historical Association published his study of an East Texas railroad titled, Whistle in the Piney Woods: Paul Bremond and the Houston, East and West Railway. He made use of an existing national organization, the Forest History Society, a non-profit supporting archives documenting the history of the industry. Maxwell collaborated with a lumber company executive, E.L. Kurth, a member of the Forest History Society board, to compile lumber-history-related documents. These are the Kurth Papers, an archival collection donated to Stephen F. Austin State College. Maxwell acquired historical documents from many other Texas lumber companies for the university.

== Personal life ==
Maxwell married Margaret Dunning, who was a member of the faculty of the University of Wisconsin School of Social Work. On September 19, 1958, their daughter was born, named Elizabeth Gail Maxwell.

== Bibliography ==
- Fickle, James E. (1993). "The Legacy of a Gentlemanly Scholar: Dr. Robert Maxwell and his Contributions to Forest History". East Texas Historical Journal. 31 (2): 3–14.
- McDonald, Archie P. (2013). "Robert Maxwell". In Cox, Patrick L.; Hendrickson, Jr., Kenneth E. (eds.). Writing the Story of Texas. Austin: University of Texas Press. pp. 136–146. ISBN 978-0-292-74537-7.
