= John and George Maxwell =

Canadian Gaelic-speaking fishermen and musicians

- Born: June 18, 1864; Marble Mountain, Cape Breton
- Died: Unknown
- Other names: Maxwell Twins

John and George Maxwell or the Maxwell Twins (born June 18, 1864) were Gaelic-speaking fishermen and musicians, known for inspiring a character in Rudyard Kipling's story Captains Courageous.

The Maxwells were African Canadians who were born in 1864 to George and Mary Jane Maxwell who were originally from Judique. They were two of six children. The Gaelic-speaking family lived in Marble Mountain, Nova Scotia, the only Black family in the area at the time. The twins were both singers and composers of Gaelic songs. John played the fiddle and knew many traditional Scottish songs.

Both brothers fished, worked in the local quarry, and farmed locally. They married—John to Jessie Pringle in 1897, George to Katie Fowler in 1903—and settled in the area. After Jessie Maxwell died in 1910, John married Minnie Borden Desmond in 1914 and the couple moved to Truro.

== Media portrayals ==
Kipling became aware of the twins while researching a story. Captains Courageous was published in 1896 and 1897 in McClure's Magazine. His character of the cook, who mostly spoke Gaelic but also knew English, was based on John and George Maxwell. At the time readers of the story expressed disbelief that a black man could speak Gaelic. The cook, who is not named in the book, is also seen on a fishing boat "riding the jib-boom and shouting Gaelic to a friend as black as himself."

The author Clara Dennis wrote about the twins in her book Cape Breton Over and Don Pillar wrote about them in his book Out of the Limelight.

The brothers became the subject of a five-minute documentary, Na Gàidheal Dubha, which made the shortlist for Scotland's FilmG Gaelic short film awards.
