= Scott Maxwell (engineer) =

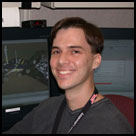
- Maxwell at a rover planning workstation
- Born: 1971; North Carolina
- Occupation: software engineer
- Known for: Mars rover driver

Scott Maxwell is an American engineer and a former Mars rover planning lead for Mars Exploration Rovers (MER) Spirit and Opportunity at the Jet Propulsion Laboratory in Pasadena, California.

He was raised in North Carolina, and attended East Carolina University and UIUC.

During early periods of the MER mission, Maxwell and other rover drivers lived on Mars time, in which each Martian "Sol" (day) is an additional 37 minutes, 23 seconds longer than Earth days, while his wife continued to live on Earth time. Maxwell published an Android app that helps keep track with Mars time at the respective landing sites. He also authored the Mars and Me blog On February 8, 2013, he left JPL to pursue a career at Google.
