= List of castles in Dumfries and Galloway =

This is a list of castles in Dumfries and Galloway, Scotland.

== List ==
Name	Type	Date	Condition	Ownership	Location	Notes	Picture
Abbot's Tower	L-plan tower house	Late 16th century	Restored in 1990; in use as a residence	Private	NX 97250 66643		
Amisfield Tower also known as Hempisfield Tower	Tower house	17th century	Still in use as a residence	Private	NX 99203 83800		Amisfield Tower
Annan Castle		12th century	Motte remains		NY 1920 6675		Mote of Annan
Auchen Castle	Courtyard castle	14th century	Ruined	Private	NT 06319 03500	Also the name of a nearby baronial house of 1849	Remains of the castle
Auchenrivock Tower	L-plan tower house	Late 16th century	Ruined	Buccleuch Estate	NY 3721 8050		
Auchenskeoch Castle	Z-plan tower house	17th century	Ruined		NX 91742 58873	Only Z-plan tower in Galloway	
Auchness Castle					NX 10674 44580		
Baldoon Castle	Tower house	17th century	Ruined	Private	Kirkinner NX 42514 53538		Baldoon Castle
Balmangan Tower	Oblong plan tower house	16th century	Ruined		NX 65021 45710		
Barclosh Castle	Oblong plan tower house	Late 16th century	Ruined	Private	NX 85478 62474		
Barholm Castle	Tower house	15th century	Restored as a residence	Private	NX 52073 52959		
Barjarg Tower	L-plan tower house	Late 16th century	Progressively restored since 18th century		NX 87792 90049		
Barscobe Castle	L-plan tower house	1648	Restored 1971	Private	NX 65967 80640		
Blackethouse Tower	Oblong plan tower house	16th century	Ruined		NY 24338 74369		
Blacklaw Tower	Oblong plan tower house	16th century	Ruined	Forestry Commission	NT 0521 0673		
Bonshaw Tower	Oblong plan tower house	16th century	Preserved	Private	NY 24256 72068		
Boreland Tower	Tower House	Late 16th century			NY 0652 9574		
Breckonside Tower	Pele tower	Late 16th or early 17th century	Ruined		Near Moniaive NX 84057 88908		
Breckonside Tower or Breconside	Oblong plan tower house	c. 1591	Ruined	Abandoned 1980	Near Moffat NT 10797 02191	Much altered and converted to a farmhouse.	
Brydekirk Tower	Tower house	16th century	Ruined	Private	NY 18696 71113	Ruins form part of series of outbuildings at Brydekirk Mains farm	
Buittle Castle		12th century	Ruined		NX 81915 61628		
Buittle Place		16th century	Restored		NX 81817 61652		
Caerlaverock Castle	Courtyard castle	13th century	Ruined	Historic Scotland	NY025656		
Cardoness Castle	Tower house	15th century	Ruined	Historic Scotland	NX589553		
Carsluith Castle	Tower house	16th century	Ruined	Historic Scotland	NX494542		
Castle Clanyard					NX 10850 37428		
Castle Kennedy (castle)	Tower house	17th century	Ruined	Private	Near Stranraer NX110608	In the grounds of Lochinch Castle, extensive gardens	
Castle of Park	Tower house	16th century	Restored as holiday accommodation	Historic Scotland	Near Glenluce NX188571	Leased to Landmark Trust	
Castle of St. John	Tower house	16th century	Restored as a museum	Dumfries and Galloway Council	Stranraer NX060607		
Castlemilk Tower	Tower house	15th century	Demolished c. 1707		NY149776		
Closeburn Castle	Tower house	14th century	Still in use as a residence	Private	NX907921		
Comlongon Castle	Tower house	15th century	Restored as a hotel	Private	NY079690	19th century extensions	
Cornal Tower	Oblong plan tower house	16th century	Ruined		NT112044		
Corra Castle, Kirkgunzeon			Only remains are those of 17th-century house	Private	NX867662		
Corsewall Castle		15th century	Ruin		Near Stranraer NW991714		
Craigcaffie Castle		c. 1570	Repaired Ruin		Innermessan NX088641	Class A listed building	
Crawfordton Tower	Trapezoid plan tower house		Ruined		NX816889		
Cruggleton Castle	Motte and bailey	12th century	Ruined	Private	In Wigtownshire NX483428		
Cumstoun Castle	Oblong plan tower house	c. 1500	Ruined		NX682532		
Dalswinton Tower	Z-plan tower house	Early 16th century	Ruined		Dalswinton NX945840		
Drumcoltran Tower	L-plan tower house	Late 16th century	Preserved	Historic Scotland	NX869682		
Drumlanrig Castle	Renaissance house	17th century	Still in use as a residence	Duke of Buccleuch	NX850992	On the site of an earlier castle	
Dumfries Castle		12th century	Ruined		Dumfries		
Dundeugh Castle	L-plan tower house	16th century	Ruined	Forestry Commission	NX601880		
Dunskey Castle	Tower house	16th century	Ruined	Private	Portpatrick NX003533		
Earlstoun Castle	L-plan tower house	16th century	Decayed but roof maintained	Private	NX618441		
Edingham Castle	Oblong plan tower house	16th century	Ruined		NX839628		
Eliock House	Tower house	16th century	Partly ruined		NS797075	Subsequent alterations, fire damaged in 1945. Category B listed building.	
Elshieshields Tower	Tower house	16th century	Restored		NY069850		
Fourmerkland Tower	Oblong plan tower house	1590	Preserved		NX908808		
Frenchland Tower	Oblong plan tower house	Late 16th or early 17th century	Ruined		NT102054		
Friar's Carse	Baronial mansion	1873	Occupied as a hotel	Private	NX125850	On the site of a castle	
Galdenoch Castle					Leswalt NW975633	Scheduled monument.	
Gillesbie Tower	Oblong plan tower house	16th century	Ruined		NY172919		
Gilnockie Tower	Oblong plan tower house	16th century	Restored as a residence	Private	NY382785	Also known as Hollows Tower	
Glenae Tower	Tower house	16th century	Ruined		NX984905	Entrance reminiscent of bastle-house or pele-house	
Hills Tower	Oblong plan tower house	16th century	Restored c. 1930		NX912726	Retains barmkin and gatehouse	
Hoddom Castle	Fortified enclosure containing L-plan tower house	1565	Preserved		NY155729		
Isle Tower or Lochar Tower	Oblong plan tower house	1587	Preserved		NY149776		
Isle of Whithorn Castle	Tower house	1674	Preserved as a residence			Isle of Whithorn Originally known as "The Isle"	
Kenmure Castle		16th century			NX635764		
Killaser Castle					NX 0964 4509		
Kirkconnell Tower	Tower house	15th century	Still in use as a residence	Private	NX979680		
Kirkcudbright Castle		12th century	motte and bailey, site next to MacLellan's Castle			Greyfriar's Church built on the site	
Lag Tower	Oblong plan tower house		Ruined		NX881862		
Langholm Tower	Tower house	16th century	Ruined		NY361849		
Lochar Tower	Rectangular plan tower house	16th century	Ruined		NY028690		
Lochhouse Tower	Oblong plan tower house	16th century	Restored as a residence	Private	NT082033		
Lochinch Castle	Baronial house	1867	Still in use as a residence	Private	Near Stranraer NX106618		
Old Lochmaben Castle	Motte and bailey	12th century	Earthworks only remain		Lochmaben NY0820882206	Possible birthplace of Robert the Bruce, 1274. Located at 2nd green and 3rd tee of Lochmaben Golf Course	
Lochmaben Castle	Castle of enceinte	c. 1298 King Edward	Ruined	Historic Scotland	Lochmaben NY088811		
Lochnaw Castle	Tower house	16th century			Leswalt NW991628	Large 17th century additions	
Lochwood Castle	L-plan tower house	15th century	Ruined	Private	NY084967	Also known as Lochwood Tower	
Lockerbie Tower	Oblong plan tower house	16th century	Demolished 1967		NY136814	Site cleared to make way for present police station	
MacLellan's Castle	Tower house	16th century	Ruined	Historic Scotland	Kirkcudbright NX681510		
Mellingshaw Tower	Tower house	16th century	Ruined		NT037088		
Morton Castle	Courtyard castle	15th century	Ruined	Historic Scotland	NX890992	Preceded by a 13th-century castle	
Mouswald Tower	Oblong plan tower house	c. 1562	Ruined		NY062739		
Myreton Castle	Tower House and later Great House	16th century	Ruined	Private	?	Built on an earlier Motte, Seat of the Myreton McCullochs; later sold to the Maxwells, located neat the white loch of Myreton	
Newbie Castle	Tower house	15th Century	Demolished 1816. Fragmentary remains	Private	NY17426469	Held by the Corries, Johnstones and then the Marquises of Annandale. Newbie Harbour was close by	
Orchardton Castle	Baronial Mansion	18th Century	Residential	Private	Orchardton Bay	Built on top of earlier mansion.	
Orchardton Tower	Tower house	15th century	Ruined	Historic Scotland	NX817550		
Plunton Castle	Tower House		Ruined				
Raecleugh Tower	Bastle house		Ruined		NT038118	Farmhouse, Moffat	
Repentance Tower	Tower house	1565	Preserved	Private	NY155722		
Robgill Tower	Tower house	12th century or earlier			NY248717		
Rusko Castle	Tower house		Restored	Private			
Sanquhar Castle	Courtyard castle	15th century	Ruined	Private	NS785092	Partially restored in the 19th century	
Sorbie Tower	Tower house	16th century	Ruined	Historic Scotland	Sorbie NX449470		
Staplegorton Castle	Motte and Bailey	12th century	No remains				
Threave Castle	Tower house	14th century	Ruined	Historic Scotland	NX739623		
Tibbers Castle or Mote de Tibris	Motte and bailey	13th century	No remains	Private	NX862982	The ruins lie within the estate of Drumlanrig Castle	
Torthorwald Castle	Oblong plan tower house	14th century	Ruined	Private	NY033782		
Wauchope Castle	Motte and bailey / Tower house / Manse	13th century	No remains				
Wigtown Castle		12th century	No remains			Wigtown	
Wreaths Tower	tower house	before 16th century	ruins		Mainsriddle, nr Southerness; NX9529356522		

== See also ==
- Castles in Scotland
- List of castles in Scotland
- List of listed buildings in Dumfries and Galloway
