= List of listed buildings in Caerlaverock, Dumfries and Galloway =

This is a list of listed buildings in the parish of Caerlaverock in Dumfries and Galloway, Scotland.

== List ==
Name	Location	Date Listed	Grid Ref. (Note: Sometimes known as OSGB36, the grid reference (where provided) is based on the British national grid reference system used by the Ordnance Survey. • "Guide to National Grid". Ordnance Survey. • "Get-a-map". Ordnance Survey.)	Geo-coordinates	Notes	LB Number (Note: Historic Environment Scotland assign a unique alphanumeric identifier to each designated site in Scotland, for listed buildings this always begins with "LB", for example "LB12345".)	Image
Bankend Bridge (B725 Over Lochar Water)				55°00′07″N 3°31′12″W	Category B	3798	Upload another image
Conheath House				55°00′43″N 3°34′10″W	Category B	3803	Upload Photo
Glencaple Quay				55°00′10″N 3°34′27″W	Category C(S)	3807	Upload Photo
Kirkconnel Lea Garden Steps To South Of House				54°59′12″N 3°33′37″W	Category C(S)	3811	Upload Photo
Caerlaverock House (Former Manse)				55°00′30″N 3°31′40″W	Category B	3800	Upload another image
Conheath North Lodge and Gatepiers				55°00′58″N 3°34′32″W	Category B	3805	Upload Photo
Caerlaverock Castle and arched Gateway to North East				54°58′33″N 3°31′27″W	Category A	3799	Upload another image
Conheath Farm House				55°00′50″N 3°34′18″W	Category B	3802	Upload Photo
Kirkconnel Lea Garden Shed To North Of House				54°59′14″N 3°33′39″W	Category C(S)	3810	Upload Photo
Conheath Farm Steading Former Dovecot And Blocks Flanking Eastern Courtyard Entrance				55°00′47″N 3°34′17″W	Category B	3814	Upload Photo
Conheath Private Chapel				55°00′32″N 3°34′17″W	Category B	3804	Upload Photo
Kirkconnel Lea Sundial				54°59′12″N 3°33′40″W	Category C(S)	3812	Upload Photo
Caerlaverock Parish Church and Churchyard				55°00′28″N 3°31′33″W	Category B	3801	Upload another image
Kirkconnel Lea House and Gatepiers				54°59′13″N 3°33′37″W	Category B	3808	Upload Photo
Kirkconnel Lea Double Well				54°59′10″N 3°33′35″W	Category C(S)	3813	Upload Photo
Kirkconnel Lea Castellated Folly				54°59′12″N 3°33′40″W	Category B	3809	Upload Photo
Conheath Walled Garden, Garden House And Summer House				55°00′44″N 3°34′21″W	Category B	3806	Upload Photo
Isle Tower				55°00′20″N 3°31′17″W	Category B	10236	Upload another image

== Key ==
The scheme for classifying buildings in Scotland is:

- Category A: "buildings of national or international importance, either architectural or historic; or fine, little-altered examples of some particular period, style or building type."
- Category B: "buildings of regional or more than local importance; or major examples of some particular period, style or building type, which may have been altered."
- Category C: "buildings of local importance; lesser examples of any period, style, or building type, as originally constructed or moderately altered; and simple traditional buildings which group well with other listed buildings."

In March 2016 there were 47,288 listed buildings in Scotland. Of these, 8% were Category A, and 50% were Category B, with the remaining 42% being Category C.
