= Caerlaverock National Nature Reserve =

Nature reserve in Dumfries and Galloway, Scotland

- IUCN category II (national park)
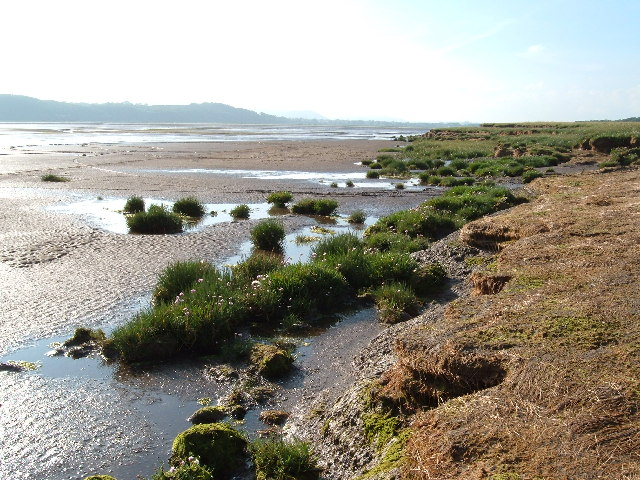
- View across the Nith Estuary, close to the Solway Firth

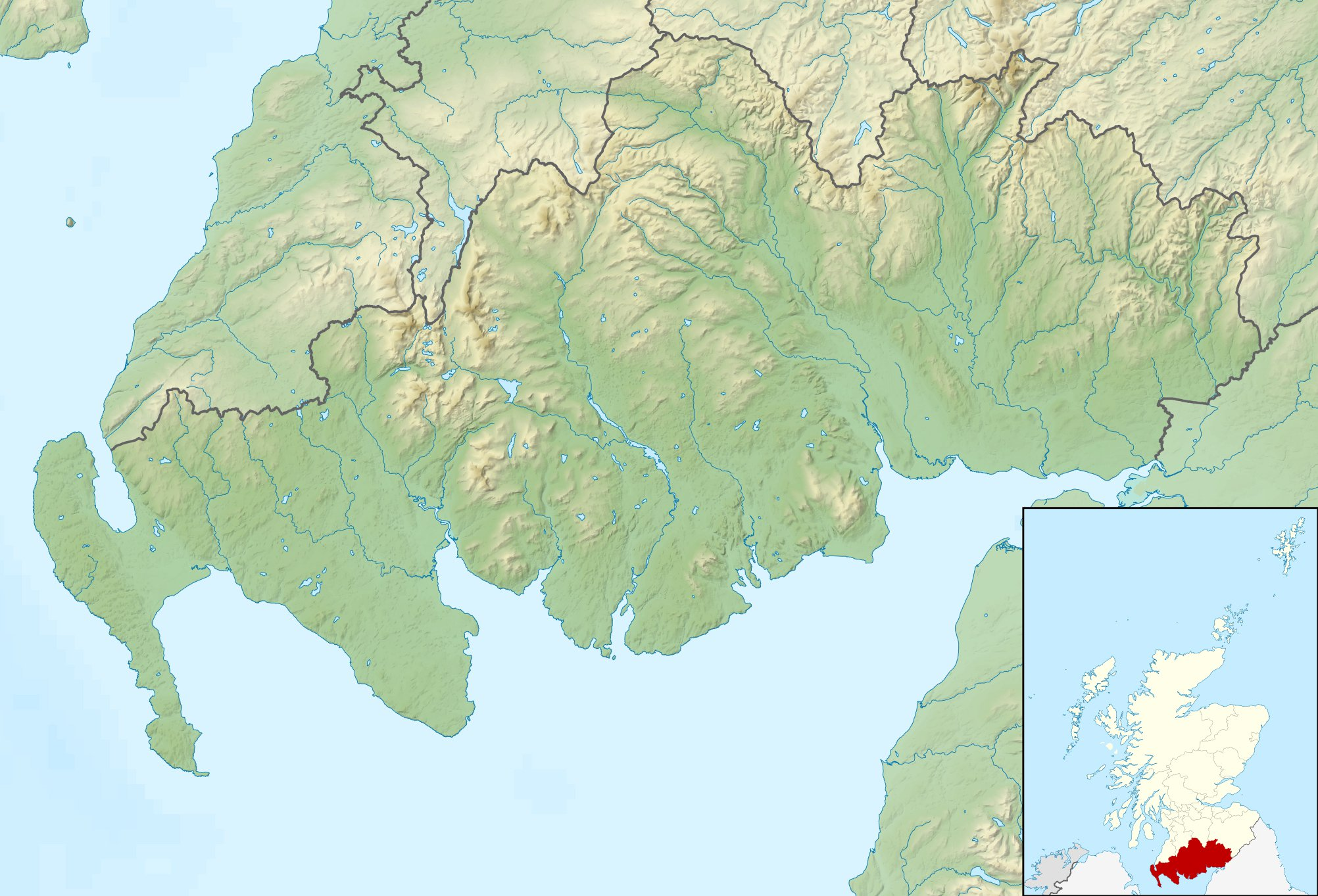
- Location within Dumfries and Galloway
- Location: Caerlaverock, Dumfries and Galloway, Scotland
- Coordinates: 54.96°N 3.47°W
- Area: 8,185 hectares (31.60 mi^{2})
- Established: 1957
- Governing body: NatureScot
- Website: Caerlaverock National Nature Reserve

Caerlaverock is a national nature reserve (NNR) covering parts of the mudflats and shoreline of the Solway Firth about 10 km south of Dumfries, in Dumfries and Galloway, Scotland. It lies between the River Nith and the Lochar Water, and consists of a variety of wetland habitats including bare mud and sand, merse and marshes, and is fringed by neutral grassland on the landward side. A nature reserve was designated in 1957 at the instigation of the Duke of Norfolk. The NNR covers an area of 82 square kilometres (32 sq mi) and is an internationally important wintering site for waterfowl and wading birds.

The NNR is now managed by NatureScot, but remains under private ownership, being managed by SNH under lease agreements. As much of the reserve is intertidal, Crown Estate Scotland are one of the major landowners. Management of the site seeks to balance the human activities (fishing, wildfowling and farming interests) with those of nature.

== Ecology ==
Virtually the entire Svalbard population of barnacle goose (roughly 38,000 as of 2015) overwinters here. More than 140,000 wading birds, including pink-footed geese, teals, goldeneyes, dunlins, grey plovers and golden plovers have been recorded in winter. In addition, many thousands of birds stop while passing through. During the summer around 45-50 species of birds breed at Caerlaverock, including shelducks, common redshanks, curlews and oystercatchers. Caerlaverock is also home to the UK's most northerly population of natterjack toads, which live in shallow pools on the landward side of the reserve. SNH estimate that Caerlaverock (and the surrounding areas) may be home to up to 10% of the UK's breeding population.

Carerlaverock NNR is part of the Upper Solway Flats and Marshes, which is a Ramsar site and a European Union Special Protection Area for birdlife, and extends across the Solway to Cumbria. The NNR is also part of the Solway Firth Special Area of Conservation, and is partly within the Nith Estuary National Scenic Area. The NNR is classified as a Category II protected area by the International Union for Conservation of Nature. There are other national nature reserves on the other side of the Solway firth, in England.

The reserve was formerly included among UNESCO's Biosphere Reserves. The site was designated in the 1970s, but subsequently the focus of the UNESCO programme shifted from the idea of isolated natural environments to one that allows for the interaction with man in terms of sustainable living and education. After new criteria for biosphere reserves were agreed in 1995, Caelaverock was among four Scottish sites delisted.

== Visitors ==
NatureScot have provided two carparks and several paths to allow visitors to access the reserve. The path network links to WWT Caerlaverock, a centre run by conservation charity Wildfowl & Wetlands Trust located next to the NNR, and to the neighbouring Historic Environment Scotland property of Caerlaverock Castle.
