= English invasion of Scotland (1298) =

Battle of Falkirk

English invasion of Scotland of 1298
- Part of Wars of Scottish Independence
Date	July 1298
Location	Scotland
Result	Militarily inconclusive; English withdrawal

Belligerents
Kingdom of Scotland	Kingdom of England: County Palatine of Durham

Commanders and leaders
William Wallace	Edward I of England; Antony Bek

Casualties and losses
	12,000 infantry; 2,500 cavalry

The English invasion of Scotland of 1298 was a military campaign undertaken by Edward I of England in retaliation to a Scottish uprising in 1297, the defeat of an English army at the Battle of Stirling Bridge and Scottish raids into Northern England.

While the English defeated a Scottish army at the Battle of Falkirk, Edward I, hampered by food shortages, was only able to reach Stirling before heading back to England.

== Background ==
The situation in Scotland had seemed resolved when Edward I returned to England on 16 September 1296, but Scottish resistance soon emerged in most parts of Scotland.

On 11 September 1297, the Scottish forces, under the joint command of Andrew de Moray and William Wallace, met an English army commanded by John de Warenne, Earl of Surrey, at the Battle of Stirling Bridge. The Scottish army deployed to the north-east of the bridge, and let the vanguard of the Earl of Surrey's army cross before attacking it. The English cavalry proved ineffective on the boggy ground around the bridge, and many were killed. The bridge collapsed as reinforcements tried to cross and the English on the opposite side of the river then fled the battlefield. The Scots suffered relatively light casualties, but Andrew Moray was seriously wounded in the battle. His death of his wounds dealt a profound blow to the Scottish cause.

After retaking a number of English controlled castles in Scotland and effectively reducing the English control to areas in Scotland around those castles still held by the English, Wallace turned his mind to the administration of the country. One of his early decisions was to reestablish commercial and diplomatic ties with Europe and win back the overseas trade which Scotland had enjoyed under Alexander III.

Wallace soon mounted an invasion of northern England, crossing into Northumberland. The Scots army followed the English army fleeing south. Caught between two armies, hundreds of refugees fled to safety behind the walls of Newcastle. The Scots laid waste a swathe of countryside before turning west into Cumberland and pillaging all the way to Cockermouth, before Wallace led his men back into Northumberland and fired 700 villages. Wallace then returned from England laden with booty.

In March 1298, Wallace was knighted, reputedly by one of the leading nobles of Scotland, and was appointed Guardian of the Kingdom of Scotland in the name of the exiled King John Balliol. He began preparations for what was surely to follow: a confrontation with Edward I.

In January 1298, Philip IV of France had signed a truce with Edward I, that did not include Scotland, thereby deserting his Scots allies.

== Invasion ==
Edward returned to England from campaigning in Flanders on 14 March 1298 and called for his army to assemble at Roxburgh. He moved the seat of government to York and called the Scottish magnates to attend. The failure of the Scottish magnates to attend resulted in them being charged with treason. Edward I left York on 25 June for Newcastle. On 3 July, he invaded Scotland, intending to crush Wallace and all those daring to assert Scotland's independence. The army travelled from Roxburgh by Lauder then Kirkliston, Edward I choosing not to enter the English controlled town of Edinburgh. Edward I then moved the camp to Linlithgow. Supplies were brought from Carlisle and from ships along the eastern coast of Scotland. Berwickshire and the Lothians had been cleared and blighted by the Scots to reduce the food available to the English army.

While the English army was awaiting supplies, Anthony Bek, Bishop of Durham, led his own large contingent of 140 knights and 1,000 foot soldiers, raised from the Palatinate of Durham, preceded by the banner of St. Cuthbert, attacked the castles of Dirleton, Hailes and Tantallon. The castles yielded to the English and were torched. At the main English camp Edward I was injured by his war horse which trampled him, causing three broken ribs.

On 22 July, Edward's army attacked a much smaller Scottish force led by Wallace near Falkirk. The English army had a technological advantage with the English longbowmen decimating Wallace's spearmen grouped in schiltrons and the light cavalry by firing scores of arrows over great distances. The Scottish cavalry fled the battlefield and in the ensuing rout, many Scots were killed at the Battle of Falkirk, although it is impossible to give a precise number.

The English army continued onto Stirling, capturing Stirling Castle and after staying a few weeks, started returning to England due to lack of supplies. The southern march took the English army from Stirling by Falkirk, Torphichen, Abercorn, Braid and Ayr. The English had been expecting ships with supplies from Ireland at Ayr, however they did not arrive. The English found Ayrshire had been deserted and laid waste by the Scots. Edward I attacked and captured Lochmaben Castle and then travelled to Carlisle where he found the supplies had been looted. Roger Bigod, 5th Earl of Norfolk and Humphrey de Bohun, 4th Earl of Hereford and their retinues left the English army after a dispute with Edward I at Carlisle. The army then travelled via Jedburgh, Roxburgh and into England and Alnwick then Newcastle.

== Aftermath ==
Although Edward I failed to subdue Scotland completely before returning to England, Wallace's military reputation was ruined. He retreated to the thick woods nearby and resigned his guardianship in December. Stirling Castle was besieged by the Scots in 1299 and the English garrison was forced to surrender. Edward I began preparations for a new invasion in 1299, however due to his impending marriage to Margaret of France, the half sister of Philip IV of France, he had to wait until 1300 to launch another invasion of Scotland.
