= Wallace's House =

Scottish fort

Coordinates: 55.2023°N 3.5188°W

Wallace's House is an earthen rampart, located near Lochmaben, Scotland, that is associated with William Wallace.

The promontory fort is a scheduled item. The fort is said to have housed a force of men led by William Wallace that harassed the English garrison at Lochmaben Castle during 1297.
