= WWT Arundel =

Nature reserve in West Sussex, England

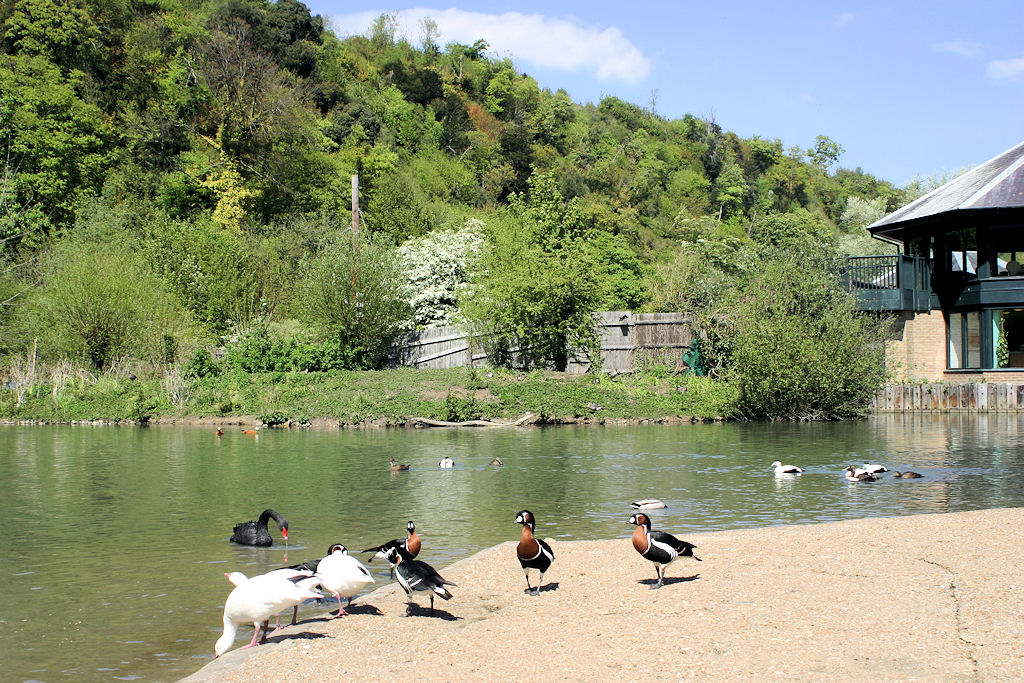
- Lake and visitor centre at the reserve

- Location within West Sussex
- Type: Nature reserve
- Location: Arundel
- Coordinates: 50°51′45.6″N 0°33′5.9″W
- Area: West Sussex
- Created: November 1976
- Operator: Wildfowl and Wetlands Trust

WWT Arundel is one of ten wildfowl and wetland nature reserves managed by the Wildfowl and Wetlands Trust, a nature conservation charity in the United Kingdom. The 60 acres (24 ha) reserve is situated at the foot of the Offham Hangar, a part of the Arun valley in Arundel, West Sussex, England.

One of the endangered species protected at the centre is the Hawaiian goose, or nēnē, the rarest goose in the world, and state bird of Hawaii. Many species of duck, goose and swan can be seen at the reserve.

The centre provides a variety of habitats from around the world for its various 'residents' such as its Coastal Creek aviary exhibit with cut-away diving tank. Visitors can watch sea ducks like long-tailed ducks and Spectacled eiders dive for fish. The Pelican Cove exhibit is home to four female Dalmatian Pelicans with daily Meet the Keeper talks.

With eight wildlife hides situated all over the site, visitors can get close up views to wildlife including nesting kingfishers and sand martins in spring. The site is noted for its summer wildflowers and roosting marsh harriers in winter.

Also available each day are Boat Safari rides through reedbed habitats, driven by WWT wildlife guides. The centre is open all year except for Christmas Day.

== Species ==
Species from other countries are not wild.

- Mute swan
- Northern shoveler
- Ferruginous duck
- Common pochard
- Red-crested pochard
- Eurasian wigeon
- Tufted duck
- Long-tailed duck

=== Living collections ===
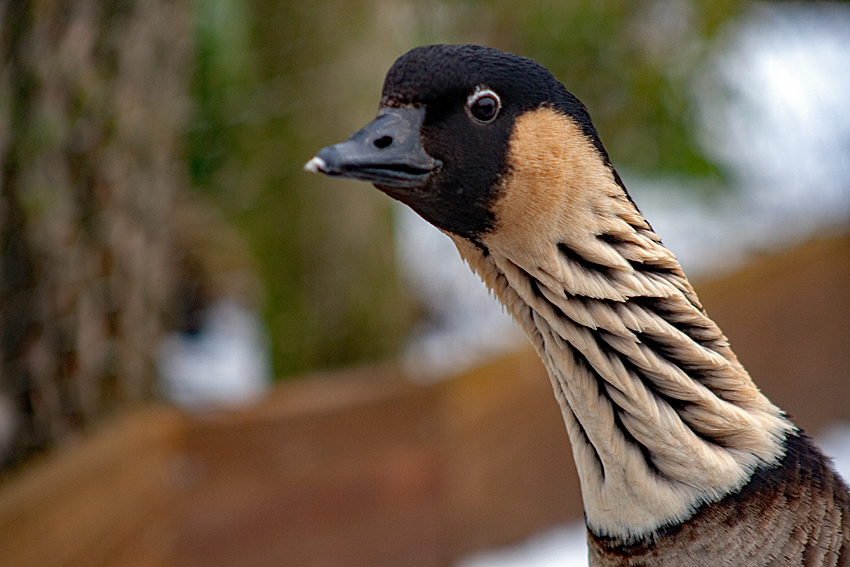
Hawaiian nēnē goose

The living collections house many bird species from around the globe, specialising in marine and diving ducks, some of which are the only examples of their species on public display in the UK.

- Common scoter
- Australian wood duck
- Red-breasted goose
- Hawaiian goose (nēnē)
- Marbled duck
- Bufflehead duck
- Carolina wood duck
- White-headed duck
- Dalmatian pelican
- Spectacled eider
- Pied avocet
- Redshank
- Bewick's swan pair
- Harlequin duck
- Scaly-sided merganser
- Black-necked grebe

=== Wild ===
- Moorhen
- Coot
- Mallard
- Kingfisher
- Teal
- Canada goose
- Common shelduck
- Greylag goose
- Common gull
- Rock dove
- Woodpigeon
- Common pheasant
- Great tit
- Blue tit
- Common chaffinch
- Robin
- Carrion crow
- Water vole
- Reed warbler
- Sedge warbler
- Cetti's warbler
- Oystercatcher
- Sand martins
- Gadwall
