= Caerlaverock =

Civil parish in Dumfries and Galloway, Scotland

Coordinates: 54.975°N 3.508°W

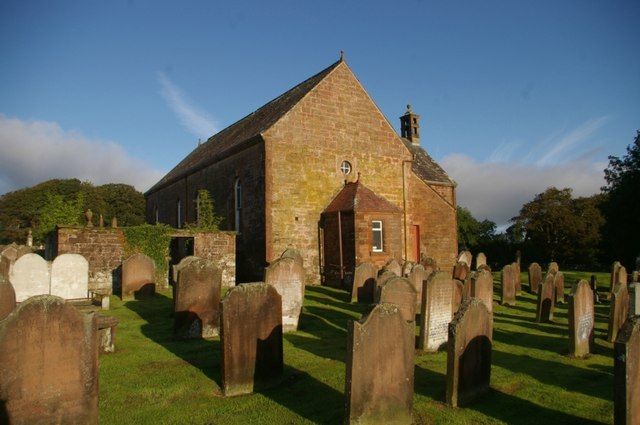
Caerlaverock Parish Church

Caerlaverock (/kərˈlævərək/; Scottish Gaelic: Cille Bhlàthain) is a civil parish in Dumfries and Galloway, Scotland.

The parish was historically in Dumfriesshire. The area includes:

- Caerlaverock Castle, a 13th-century castle, located 11 kilometres (6.8 mi) south of Dumfries, Scotland
- Caerlaverock National Nature Reserve, a National Nature Reserve in the Solway Firth, south-west Scotland
- WWT Caerlaverock, a Wildfowl and Wetlands Trust nature reserve, located 12 kilometres (7.5 mi) south of Dumfries, Scotland

== Etymology ==
The name Caerlaverock is of Brittonic origin. The first part of the name is the element cajr meaning "an enclosed, defensible site", (Welsh caer, "fort, city"). The second part of the name may be the personal name Lïμarch (Welsh Llywarch), or a lost stream-name formed from the adjective laβar, "talkative" (Welsh llafar, see Afon Llafar), suffixed with –ǭg, "having the quality of", or the adjectival suffix -īg. The present form has been influenced by the Scots word laverock, "skylark".
