= Bankend, Dumfries and Galloway =

Village in Dumfries and Galloway, Scotland

Coordinates: 55.002°N 3.522°W

Bankend
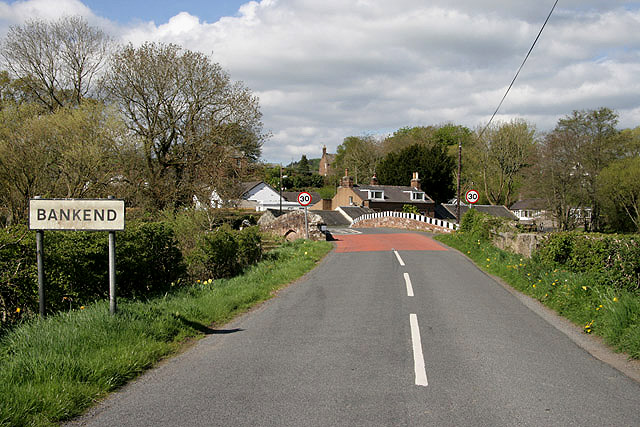

- Location within Dumfries and Galloway
- Council area: Dumfries and Galloway
- Lieutenancy area: Dumfriesshire
- Country: Scotland
- Sovereign state: United Kingdom
- Police: Scotland
- Fire: Scottish
- Ambulance: Scottish
- UK Parliament: Dumfriesshire, Clydesdale and Tweeddale
- Scottish Parliament: Galloway and West Dumfries

Bankend is a village in Dumfries and Galloway, Scotland. It is located near Lochar Water, the civil parish Caerlaverock and the villages of Blackshaw, Glencaple and Shearington. In 1961 it had a population of 79.

== Isle Tower ==
Isle Tower is a 16th-century ruined tower house, that was a property of the Maxwell family. It was built around 1565 and is B listed.

== Bankend Bridge ==
Bankend Bridge is a road bridge that carries the B725 road across the Lochar Water. It was completed in 1813 and is B listed.

== Caerlaverock Parish Memorial ==
Caerlaverock Parish Memorial is a stone war memorial that was unveiled in 1956 by Mrs J Telfer of Glencaple to commemorate people who lost their lives in World War I and II. There is 33 names on the memorial, 21 from World War I and 12 from World War II.

== See also ==
- List of places in Dumfries and Galloway
- List of listed buildings in Caerlaverock, Dumfries and Galloway
