= Abbot's Tower =

Tower house in Dumfries and Galloway, Scotland

- Near New Abbey, Dumfries and Galloway, Scotland; UK grid reference NX972666
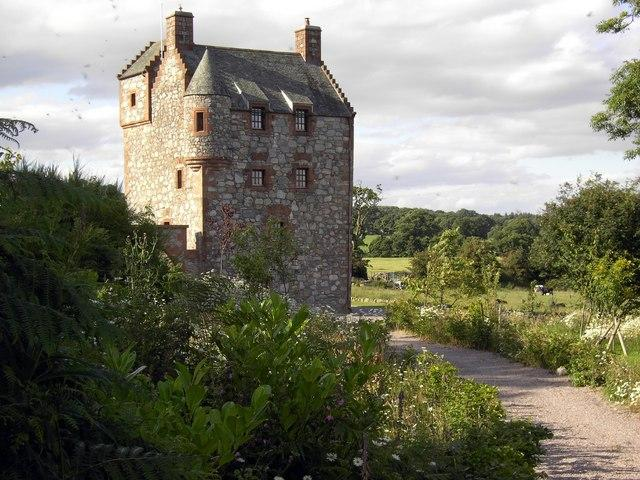
- Abbot's Tower in 2008

Site information
- Type: Tower house
- Owner: Private
- Open to the public: No
- Condition: Restored

Location
- Shown within Scotland
- Location within Scotland
- Coordinates: 54.98376°N 3.605837°W

Site history
- Built: Around 1580
- In use: until c.1627; reoccupied in 1990s
- Materials: Stone

Abbot's Tower is a 16th-century tower house situated near New Abbey, Dumfries and Galloway, Scotland, that was built by the Abbot of Sweetheart Abbey. The building was restored in the early 1990s and is now used as a private residence. This structure should not be confused with the Abbot's Tower of Alnwick Castle.

== History ==
The tower was built around 1580 as a refuge by John Broun. John Braun builds Abbots Tower on the site of his Pele Tower from stone taken from the nearby abbey where his uncle had been abbot, before the Crown is able to conclude its intentions to take the abbey into Crown ownership.

Gilbert Braun a well-known Jesuit who, as an active member of the Society of Jesus, a zealous Roman Catholic order of priests, founded to do missionary work against the Reformation, becomes priest at the abbey.

He is supported and protected by the most powerful family in the area, the Maxwell family. Despite repeated orders to arrest Braun, the Maxwell's stand by their man and their Catholic beliefs. Despite the abbey's suppression during the Scottish Reformation, Broun continued to uphold the Roman Catholic faith until he was arrested in 1605 and ultimately exiled.

== Structure ==
Abbot's Tower is a L-plan tower house, originally measuring 28.75 by 23.6 feet (8.8 by 7.2 m) with a short staircase wing extending north 8.5 feet (2.6 m). Its rubbled walls were about 4 feet (1.2 m) thick with only one room per storey. Each has a fireplace at one end and there was a garderobe in the south corner. By 1892, it was in a ruinous state, with the portions of the walls still surviving to a height of 32 feet (9.8 m). The west and staircase walls were almost complete, but portions of the other walls had fallen and the hewn stones taken.

Archaeological investigations in the early 1990s revealed remnants of outbuildings and portions of what were probably foundations of the barmkin walls. The tower was restored and converted into a private residence in the 1990s.

== Bibliography ==
- Coventry, Martin (2001) The Castles of Scotland, 3rd Ed. Scotland: Goblinshead ISBN 1-899874-26-7
- Maxwell-Irving, A. M. T. (2000) The Border Towers of Scotland, Creedon Publications ISBN 1-899316-31-0
