= List of listed buildings in Leswalt, Dumfries and Galloway =

This is a list of listed buildings in the civil parish of Leswalt, in Dumfries and Galloway, Scotland.

== List ==
Name	Location	Date Listed	Grid Ref. (Note: Sometimes known as OSGB36, the grid reference (where provided) is based on the British national grid reference system used by the Ordnance Survey. • "Guide to National Grid". Ordnance Survey. • "Get-a-map". Ordnance Survey.)	Geo-coordinates	Notes	LB Number (Note: Historic Environment Scotland assign a unique alphanumeric identifier to each designated site in Scotland, for listed buildings this always begins with "LB", for example "LB12345".)	Image
Lochnaw Castle, With Terrace, Gatepiers, Courtyard Walls, Bell, Monument And Pavilion				54°55′11″N 5°08′09″W	Category A	13498	Upload Photo
Lochnaw, Garden House				54°55′16″N 5°08′29″W	Category C(S)	13499	Upload Photo
Lochnaw, Kathleen Cottage And Gatepiers				54°55′28″N 5°08′18″W	Category C(S)	13500	Upload Photo
Lochnaw, Kinsale Tower				54°55′00″N 5°07′54″W	Category B	13501	Upload Photo
Larbrax Schoolhouse And Hall (Former School)				54°54′12″N 5°08′43″W	Category C(S)	13494	Upload Photo
Lochnaw, Noel Lodge				54°55′20″N 5°06′54″W	Category C(S)	13503	Upload Photo
Lochnaw, Old Lochnaw Castle				54°55′24″N 5°07′59″W	Category C(S)	13504	Upload Photo
House Of Knock				54°52′20″N 5°08′36″W	Category B	13493	Upload Photo
Meikle Galdenoch, Farmhouse, With Boundary Walls				54°55′21″N 5°09′49″W	Category C(S)	13506	Upload Photo
Beach Lodge, With Boundary Walls				54°53′34″N 5°09′35″W	Category B	10117	Upload Photo
Craigencross, With Boundary Wall				54°55′38″N 5°04′41″W	Category B	13490	Upload Photo
Lochnaw, Boathouse				54°55′13″N 5°08′07″W	Category B	13496	Upload Photo
Agnew Monument				54°56′12″N 5°06′38″W	Category B	10115	Upload Photo
Galdenoch Castle				54°55′21″N 5°09′50″W	Category A	13491	Upload Photo
Lochnaw, Larbrax Lodge				54°54′28″N 5°08′57″W	Category C(S)	13502	Upload Photo
Old Leswalt Church And Graveyard				54°55′47″N 5°05′54″W	Category B	13507	Upload Photo
Leswalt Parish Church, With Boundary Walls And Gatepiers				54°55′49″N 5°05′32″W	Category B	13495	Upload Photo
Lochnaw, Bridge Over Mill Isle Burn				54°55′20″N 5°08′17″W	Category C(S)	13497	Upload Photo
Lochnaw, Walled Garden				54°55′18″N 5°08′25″W	Category A	13505	Upload Photo
Aldouran Lodge				54°55′51″N 5°06′11″W	Category C(S)	10116	Upload Photo
Galdenoch Mill				54°55′29″N 5°09′51″W	Category C(S)	13492	Upload Photo

== Key ==
The scheme for classifying buildings in Scotland is:

- Category A: "buildings of national or international importance, either architectural or historic; or fine, little-altered examples of some particular period, style or building type."
- Category B: "buildings of regional or more than local importance; or major examples of some particular period, style or building type, which may have been altered."
- Category C: "buildings of local importance; lesser examples of any period, style, or building type, as originally constructed or moderately altered; and simple traditional buildings which group well with other listed buildings."

In March 2016 there were 47,288 listed buildings in Scotland. Of these, 8% were Category A, and 50% were Category B, with the remaining 42% being Category C.
