= Hills Tower =

16th-century tower house, with 18th-century wing, in Scotland

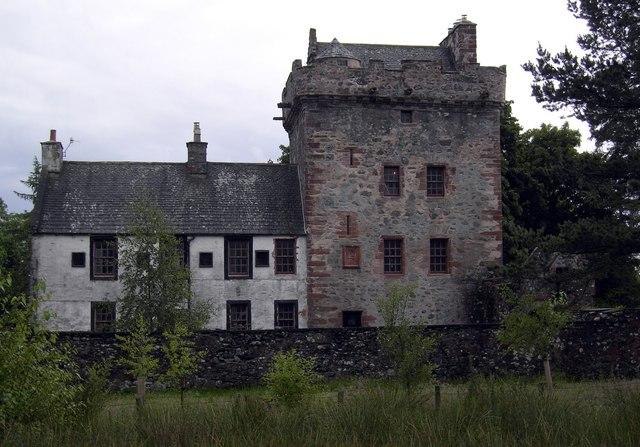

- Location of the tower within Dumfries and Galloway
- 55°02′12″N 3°42′13″W
- Type: Tower house
- Location: Cargenbridge, Dumfries and Galloway

Listed Building – Category A
- Designated: 1971
- Reference no.: LB9715

Hills Tower is a sixteenth-century square tower house, with an adjoining eighteenth-century wing, near Dumfries in Scotland. Originally built around 1527 for Edward Maxwell, who had purchased the estate from James Douglas of Drumlanrig, it was improved in the later sixteenth century by his grandson, also Edward Maxwell. In 1721, another Edward Maxwell had a two-storey Georgian wing added to the tower's east side, using stone taken from older buildings nearby, and incorporating armorial panels celebrating members of the Maxwell family.

The tower is unusual in that it has retained its original barmkin walls and their gatehouse. It eventually passed by marriage to the McCullochs of Ardwall, who still retained ownership of it as of 1994. It is still inhabited, and in 1971 the tower, along with the walls and gatehouse, was designated a Category A listed building.

== Description ==
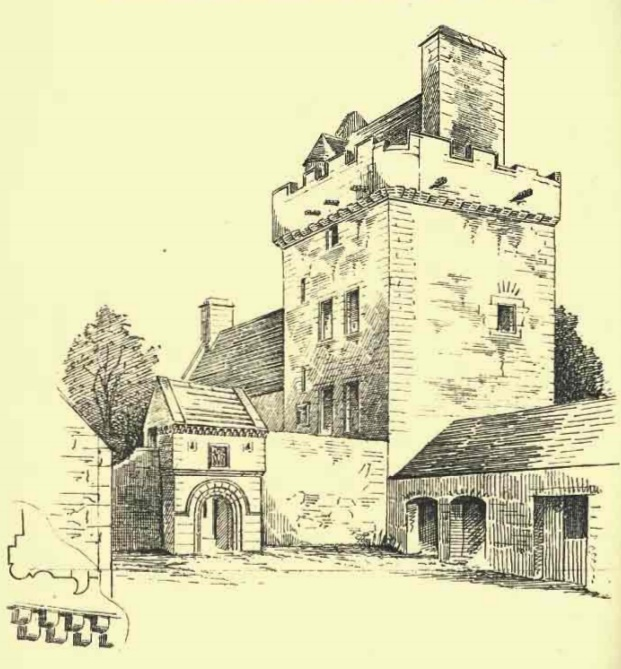
Hills Tower in the nineteenth century

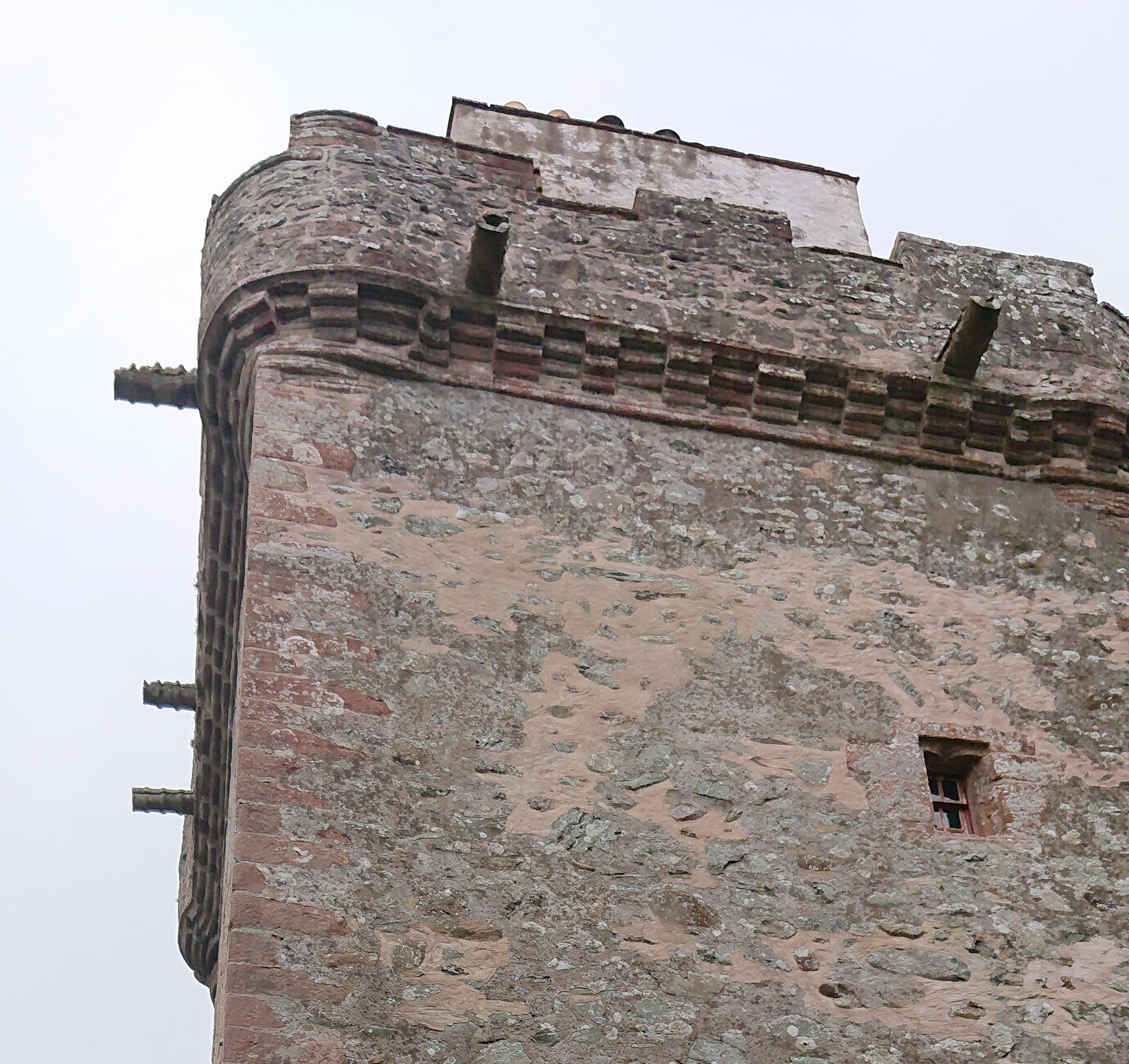
Gargoyles, carved to resemble cannon, project from the parapet

Hills Tower is set in farmland near the hamlet of Lochrutton, approximately 10 kilometres (6.2 mi) south-west of Dumfries. The main part of the building is a four-storey square tower house, attached to which on the east is a two-storey Georgian extension. The building is set within a courtyard, with a surviving small gatehouse.

The main tower has a footprint of 30 feet (9.1 m) by 24 feet 3 inches (7.39 m), and its walls, which are up to 4 feet 6 inches (1.37 m) thick at the base, rise to a height of 45 feet (14 m) to the level of the parapet. It has a single door, on the ground floor, giving access to the house from the courtyard; grooves remain in the stonework for the iron yett that would originally have protected the entrance. Above the door is an armorial panel, which bears the worn initials of Edward Maxwell, who had the tower built, and his wife Janet Corsane (or Carson). The door enters into a small vestibule, from which leads a turnpike stair, and a door into the vaulted basement, which would originally have been a store room; a fireplace was built into it in the twentieth century.

The great hall is on the first floor, and is provided with a large fireplace, 6 feet 8 inches (2.03 m) in width, and a window recess with stone seating in the walls to either side of it. Two further smaller windows on the opposite wall are now blocked. Both the hall on the first floor, and the single room in the floor above it, have garderobes in the south-east corner. At the top of the stairway is a cap-house, which leads out onto the parapet, running around the whole circumference of the tower. Gargoyles, intricately carved to resemble cannon, provide drainage for the roof.

The east wing connects to the tower internally, but can also be entered through a door from the courtyard; above this door is a datestone, inscribed with the year of the wing's construction, 1721. Between the windows in the second storey of its four-bay north front are more armorial panels, with inscriptions for Sir John Maxwell, Lord Herries, and his wife Agnes, Lady Herries, and for Edward Maxwell of Hills and his wife, Agnes Maxwell. These panels, for the second and third inhabitants of the tower, are of the sixteenth or early seventeenth centuries, and must have been taken from elsewhere and added to the wing when it was being built. The interior of the wing is mostly modern, having been renovated in the twentieth century; the east room on the ground floor served as a kitchen when the wing was built.

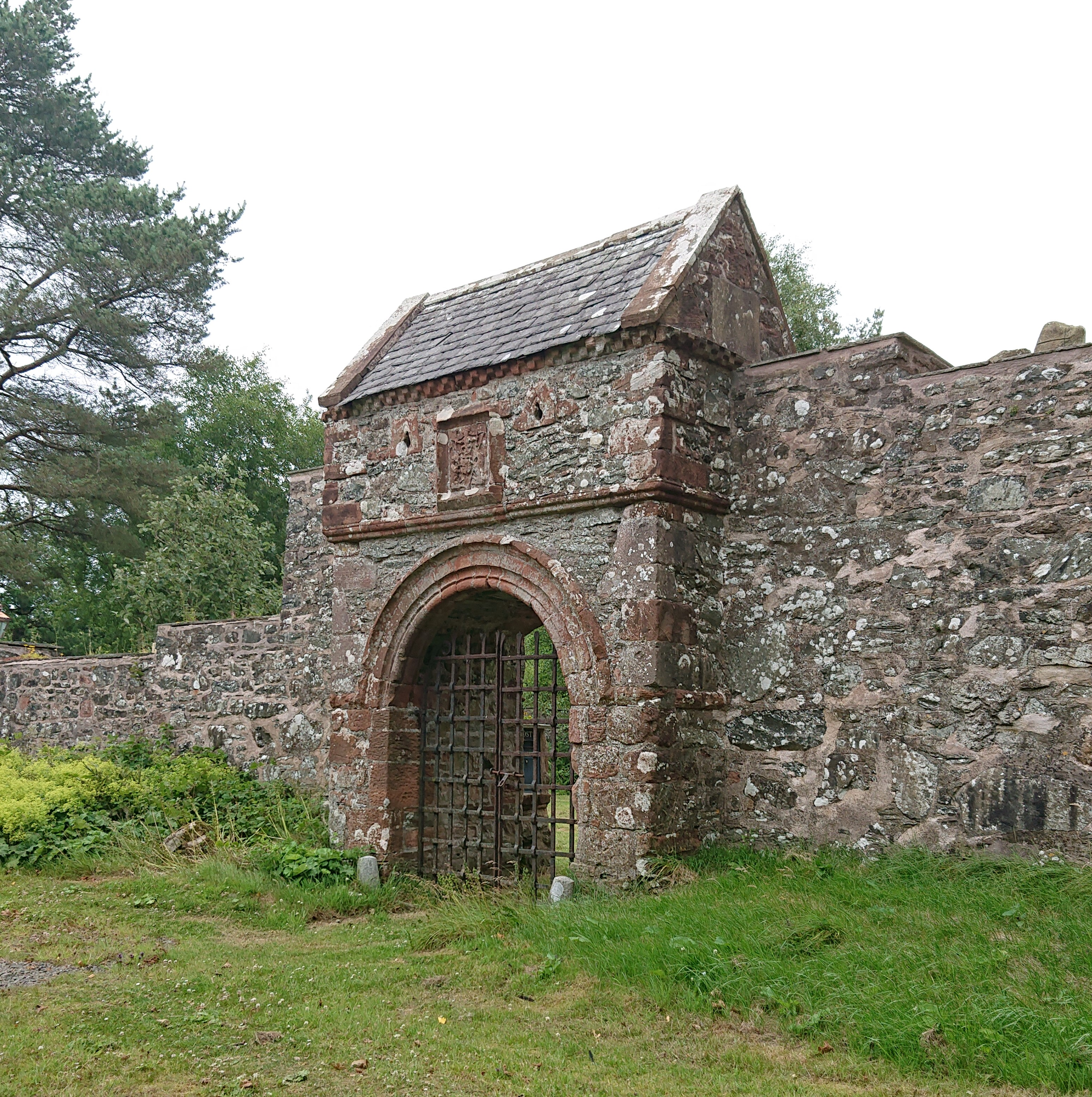
The gatehouse

The tower is very unusual in that it retains both its barmkin walls and its gatehouse. The walls, which are 3 feet (0.91 m) thick and up to 12 feet 6 inches (3.81 m) high, enclose an area that is 65 feet (20 m) by 57 feet (17 m). The courtyard within is entered through a gatehouse, with an arched gateway, 6 feet (1.8 m) wide and 7 feet 5 inches (2.26 m) high, and protected by a yett; above this is a chamber, accessible from the inside only by a ladder, from which a pair of gun loops provided a defensive field of fire over the approach to the gate.

== History ==
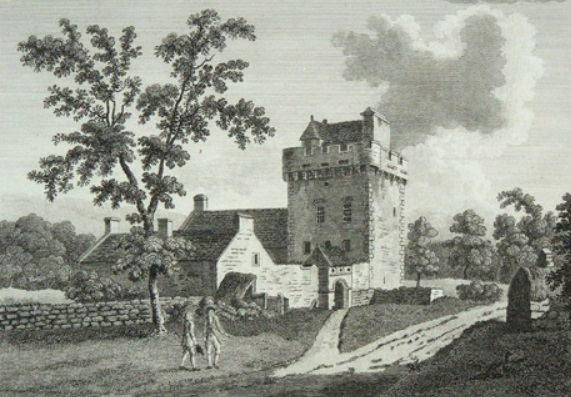
An eighteenth-century view of the tower

In 1527 Edward Maxwell, tenant of Breconside, bought the Hills estate from James Douglas of Drumlanrig, and had the original tower built soon afterwards. It was later improved by his grandson, also Edward Maxwell, the third laird, between 1598 and 1600; the surviving gatehouse was added at this time, and work was done on the upper parts of the tower, including the addition of the cannon gargoyles. The building works put a financial strain on the family, but they were able to retain ownership of the property and in 1721 the sixth laird, another Edward Maxwell, commissioned the mason John Selchrig (or Selkirk) to add the two-storey wing to the east side of the tower. This addition, which provided the tower with additional space and a more modern kitchen, was built in part with material recycled from older nearby buildings, at a cost of 900 merks.

The building later passed by marriage to the McCullochs of Ardwall, who still owned it as of 1994. In 2003 Hills was sold to new owners who carried out extensive repairs. It is still in use as a residence, and was designated a Category A listed building in 1971; its barmkin walls and gatehouse are included in the designation.

== Sources ==
- Gifford, John (1996). The Buildings of Scotland:Dumfries and Galloway. London: Penguin. ISBN 0140-71067-1.
- Historic Environment Scotland. "Hills Tower, Gatehouse and Courtyard Walls (Category A Listed Building LB9715)".
- Hume, John R (2000). Dumfries and Galloway: An Illustrated Architectural Guide. Edinburgh: The Rutland Press. ISBN 1-873-190-344.
- Lindsay, Maurice (1994). The Castles of Scotland. London: Constable. ISBN 0-09-473430-5.
- Maxwell-Irving, Alastair M. T. (2014). The Border Towers of Scotland 2: Their Evolution and Architecture. Stirling: Alastair M. T. Maxwell-Irving. ISBN 978-1-907931-37-6.
