= WWT Caerlaverock =

Wetland nature reserve in southwest Scotland

Coordinates: 54.984°N 3.500°W

WWT Caerlaverock is wetland nature reserve in southwest Scotland, one of ten reserves in Britain operated by the Wildfowl and Wetlands Trust founded by Sir Peter Scott.

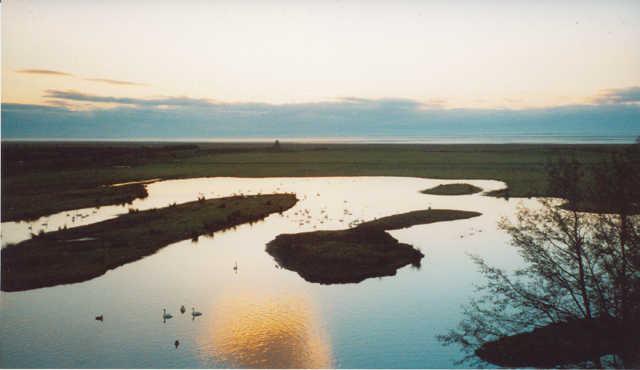
WWT Caerlaverock

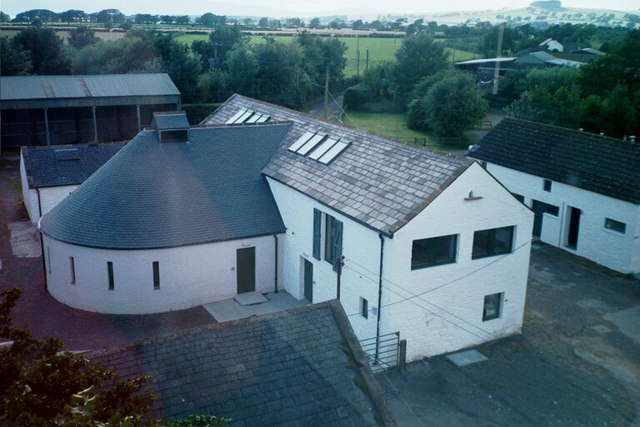
Caerlaverock WWT Visitor Centre

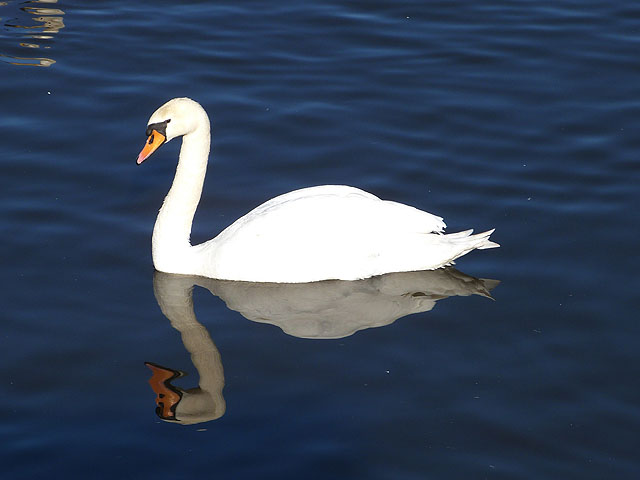
Mute Swan on Whooper Pond at Caerlaverock WWT

It covers a 587 hectares (1,450 acres) site at Eastpark Farm, on the north shore of the Solway Firth to the south of Dumfries. It is a wild nature reserve with a network of screened approaches and several observation towers. There is a visitor centre. The site received 16,105 visitors in 2019. The site was closed for the first half of 2026. It re-opened on 2nd July 2026 for three days a week, and as of 29th September 2026, it is now open Tuesdays to Fridays. The visitor centre remains but there will no longer be a café or shop.

Caerlaverock is home to one of only two UK populations of the "living fossil" Triops cancriformis, the horseshoe shrimp. It is also home to the UK's most northerly population of the natterjack toad.

Almost the entire Svalbard population of barnacle goose overwinters in the Solway Firth area, with many of the birds often at Caerlaverock for part or all of the winter; their protection by the reserve has enabled the population to recover from just 500 birds in the 1940s, to over 25,000 now. In 2016 the peak count on the reserve was 15,980 in October. Other high counts of wildfowl that year included 221 whooper swan, 2,457 Northern pintail, 3,000 Eurasian teal, 1,230 Eurasian wigeon and 150 greater scaup. These numbers attract raptors such as peregrine falcon, common buzzard and hen harrier. Vagrant birds recorded on the reserve include common crane, long-billed dowitcher, red-breasted goose, snow goose, ring-necked duck and white-tailed plover.

In January 2002, a new visitor centre was officially opened by King Harald V of Norway.

The webcams on the website show the badgers or the Whooper Pond where the whooper swans and other migrating birds spend their winters.

== See also ==
- Caerlaverock Castle
- Caerlaverock NNR
