= Cornal Tower =

Mansion ruins in Scotland

Coordinates: 55.3255°N 3.4013°W

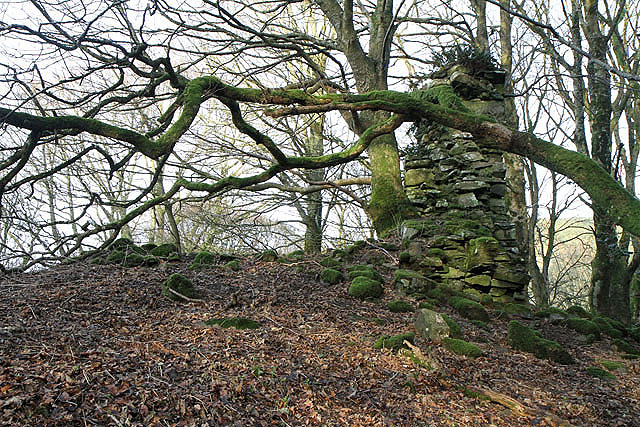

Cornal Tower is the ruins of a tower house located near Moffat, Dumfries-shire, Scotland.

Alternative names are Polcornare, Cornal Burn, or Logan. The ruins are located on a plateau and the grounds consisted of five farms.

The place was said to be a hunting lodge for Scottish kings. In the 15th century, the land was given to the Carruthers family of Mousewald. Then it was given to Johnstone of Coreheard. It was also later owned by the Duke of Queensberry.

Only a portion of the north wall currently remains.
