= Annan Castle =

Coordinates: 54.9886°N 3.2643°W

Designations

Scheduled monument
- Official name: Mote of Annan
- Type: Secular: bailey; motte
- Designated: 25 March 1954
- Reference no.: SM702

Annan Castle, was a castle that was located on the banks of the River Annan, in Annan, Scotland.

== History ==
A motte and bailey castle was built in the early 12th century by the de Brus family, Lords of Annandale. A flood in the mid-12th century changed the course of the River Annan, which caused the castle mound to be partially eroded. The castle was abandoned as the main seat of the de Brus family, who moved to Lochmaben Castle.

In February 1552, a master mason David Dog was sent by Regent Arran to hire stonemasons to work "at the tour of Annand".

The site of the castle is designated a scheduled monument.
