= Barclosh Castle =

Castle in Dumfries and Galloway, Scotland

- Near Dalbeattie, Dumfries and Galloway, Scotland; UK grid reference NX650457

Site information
- Type: Oblong plan Tower house
- Owner: Private
- Open to the public: Yes
- Condition: Ruined

Location
- Shown within Scotland
- Coordinates: 54.944434°N 3.788268°W

Site history
- Built: 16th century
- Materials: Mixture of grey granite and red sandstone

Barclosh Castle is a ruined 16th-century tower house about 3.2 kilometers north-east of Dalbeattie, Dumfries and Galloway. There is little still standing, except a section of wall 1.2 metres thick and 8.0 metres high.

== Works cited ==
- Coventry, Martin (2015) The Castles of Scotland, 5th Ed. Prestonpans, Scotland: Goblinshead ISBN 9781899874552
