= Leswalt =

Coordinates: 54°55′50″N 5°05′35″W

Leswalt: Scottish Gaelic: Lios Uillt
- Location within Dumfries and Galloway
- Council area: Dumfries and Galloway
- Lieutenancy area: Wigtown
- Country: Scotland
- Sovereign state: United Kingdom
- Post town: Stranraer
- Postcode district: DG9
- Dialling code: 01776 870***
- Police: Scotland
- Fire: Scottish
- Ambulance: Scottish
- UK Parliament: Dumfries and Galloway
- Scottish Parliament: Galloway and West Dumfries

Leswalt (Scottish Gaelic: Lios Uillt) is a village and civil parish in Dumfries and Galloway, south-west Scotland. It lies between Portpatrick and Stranraer in the Rhins of Galloway, part of the traditional county of Wigtownshire. The parish covers around 8 square miles (21 km^{2}).

== History ==
"Leswalt" is a name of unknown origins. Possible derivations for its name include Welsh llys gwellt, meaning "grass court", or perhaps Gaelic lios uillt, meaning "fort of the glen", referring to Lochnaw Castle.

In the Middle Ages, the area was probably divided into feudal baronies, each controlled by a Baron of the Court, under the overall control of the Sheriff of Wigtownshire. In ancient times it belonged to the monks of Tongland Abbey.

In 1390 Archibald Douglas, 3rd Earl of Douglas, granted lands at Leswalt to his illegitimate son or relative, William Douglas of Leswalt. William Douglas was self-styled "Lord of Leswalt", and Sheriff of Wigton, but was dismissed by Margaret, Duchess of Touraine, daughter of King Robert III of Scotland and wife of Archibald Douglas, 4th Earl of Douglas, as part of a power struggle in south-west Scotland. Under duress he transferred lands at Lochnaw to Andrew Agnew, constable of Lochnaw Castle, receiving Cruggleton Castle in exchange.

Andrew Agnew had been made hereditary constable of Lochnaw Castle by William Douglas of Leswalt in 1426. He received several charters from James I of Scotland, including one of 31 January 1431, confirming to him and his heirs the office of heritable constable of Lochnaw, with the whole lands and "Barony of Lochnaw". In 1451 Andrew Agnew was confirmed as Hereditary Sheriff of Wigtownshire. In 1458 he was paid as sheriff.

In 1463 when George Douglas of Leswalt (son of William Douglas of Leswalt and Katherine Maxwell) died, the lands of Leswalt and Cruggleton reverted to the Crown, as a consequence of the forfeiture of all of the properties of the Earl of Douglas in AD1456. They were appropriated by Mary of Guelders, the Queen Mother, widow James II of Scotland, and were subsequently claimed by Gilbert Kennedy (later Lord Kennedy), a half-brother to George Douglas, for his son, John Kennedy. These passed to his son, Alexander Kennedy, who made them over to his brother, David Kennedy, 3rd Lord Kennedy, from whom the Earls of Cassilis are descended.

Salt was produced at Salt Pan Bay in Leswalt from 1637.

== Places of interest ==
=== Parish Church ===
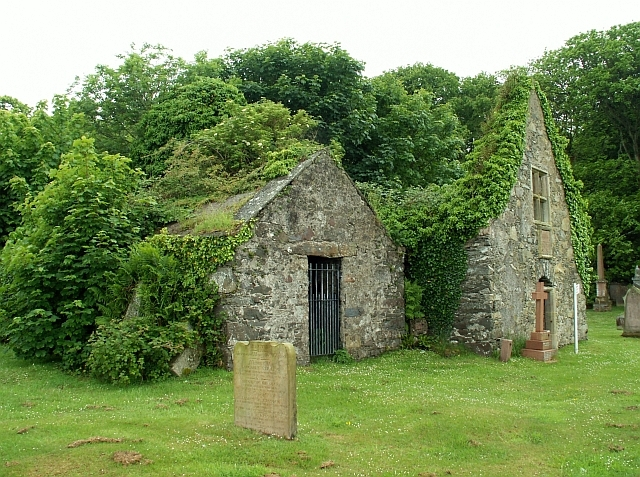
Leswalt Old Church

The Old Kirk of Leswalt, now ruined, is of medieval origin, having been given to the monks of Tongland Abbey in the 14th century. The adjoining Agnew Aisle dates from the 17th century. In 1828 the present church was built and the old one abandoned.

=== Lochnaw Castle ===
Lochnaw Castle was home to the Agnew family. The ruins of the Old Castle stand on an island in Lochnaw Loch, and date to the 13th century. The present castle incorporates a 16th-century tower house, but is largely the result of remodelling in the 18th century.

=== Historical sites ===
Rev. George Wilson's Archaeological and Historical Collections relating to Ayrshire and Galloway list forts in Leswalt. (a) Lashindarroch on Knock-na-maize circular fort. (b) Two on Port Slogan. (c) Larbrax fort with two traverses at the Kemp's Walk. (d) Salpans Bay fort. (e) High Auchneel, not on O.S. map. (f) Aldouran Glenhead fort called the Kemps' Graves. (g) Tor of Craigoch circular fort with outer defences.

- Iron-Age fort (Larbrax Fort) stood overlooking Broadsea Bay (Larbrax Beach), Larbrax fort Cave
- Kemp's Walk (probably Larbrax Fort, Larbrax Beach), Meikle Larbrax on a large promontory. There is an entrance (Larbrax fort Cave) near the eastern side.
- An ancient dun overlooking Killantringan Bay (Kilringan Bay on 1782 map).
- Killantringan Lighthouse was built around 1899. The name Killantringan is derived from "Ringan or Ninian's Cell".
- Iron-Age fort stood overlooking Salt Pans Bay.
- High Auchneel
- Sir Andrew Agnew's monument sits on top of the Tor of Craigoch, a prehistoric hill fort above Leswalt village and provides a fine view.
- The island in Lochnaw or Loch Naw, a loch which has been drained and refilled in its long lifespan, once held an 11th-century castle fort, taken and dismantled in AD1390 by "Archibald the Grim" (Archibald Douglas, 3rd Earl of Douglas).
- A mote stood by the side of lake of Lochnaw. In 1791 Sir Stair Agnew used its materials to form a new approach.
- Galdenoch Castle dated 1547 was home of Gilbert Agnew of Lochnaw until 1570

== Gallery ==
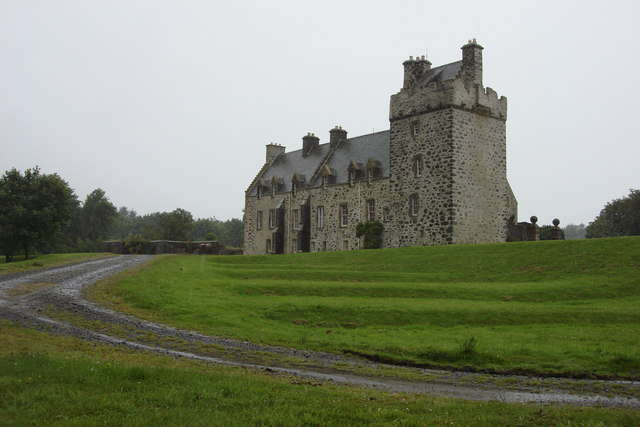
Lochnaw Castle

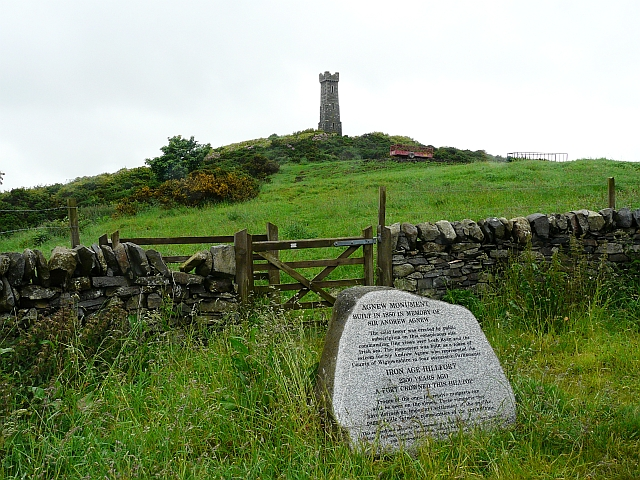
Agnew Monument on Tor of Craigoch hill fort

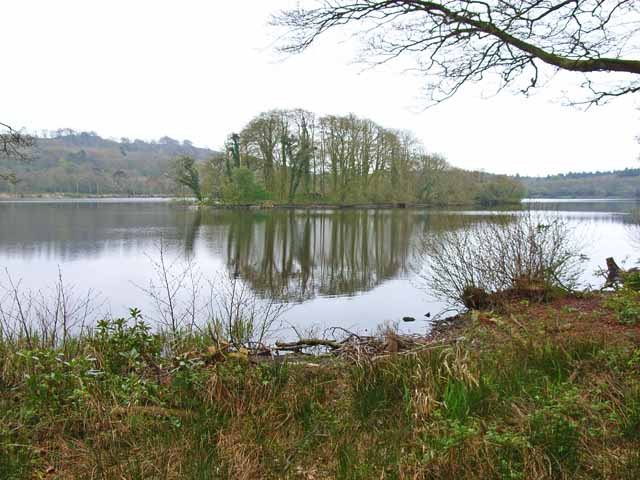
Loch Naw or Island of Lochnaw

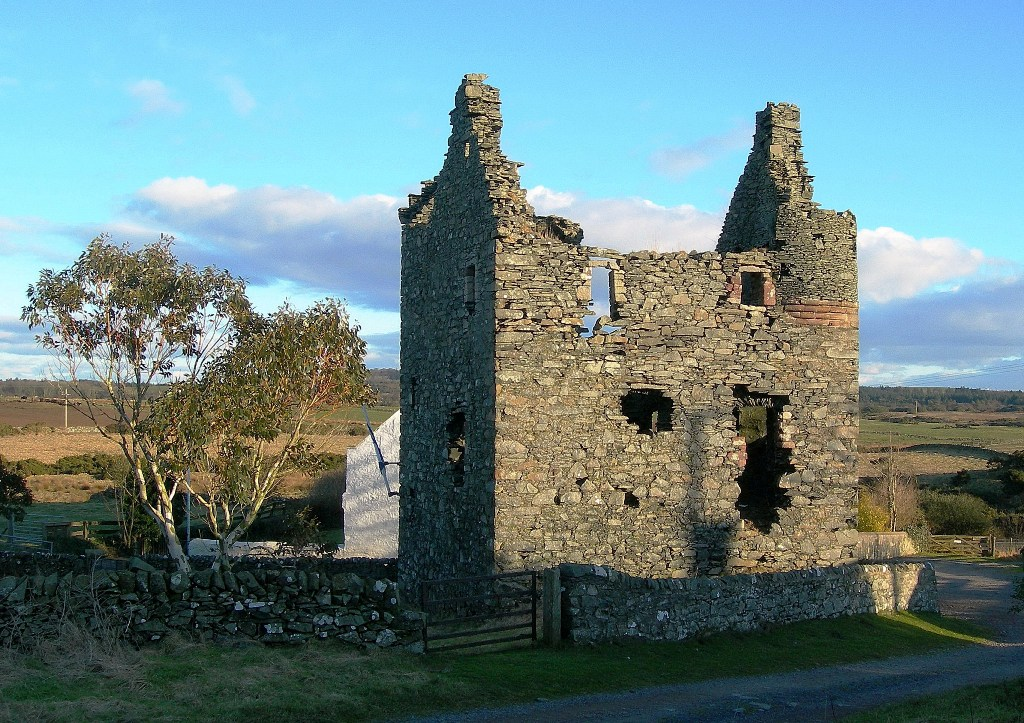
Galdenoch Castle dated 1547 of Gilbert Agnew until 1570

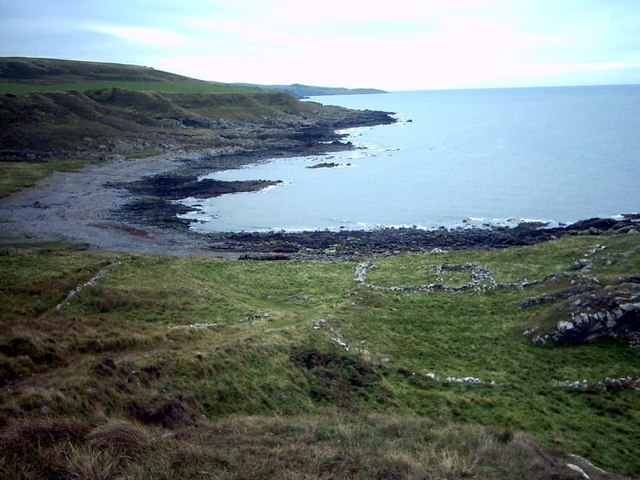
Salt Pans Bay, site of an ancient fort. photo by Jeff Wells

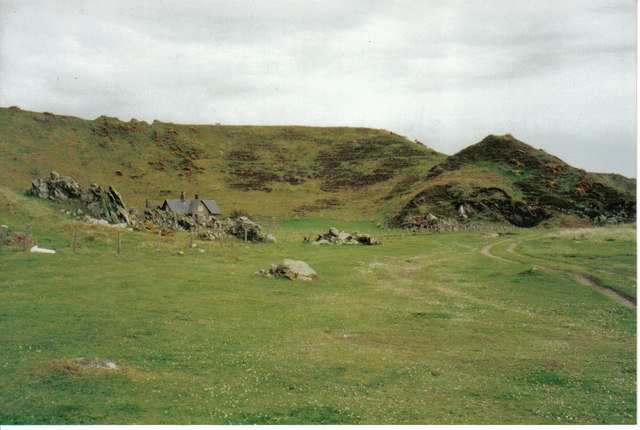
Broadsea Bay, site of Larbrax Iron Age hill fort

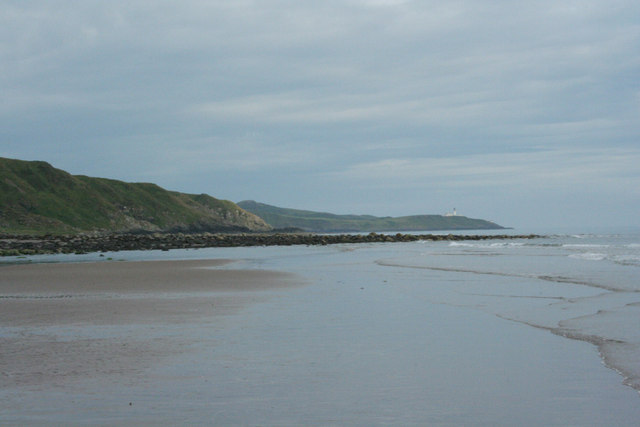
Larbrax beach, Broadsea Bay, with view of Killantringan Lighthouse

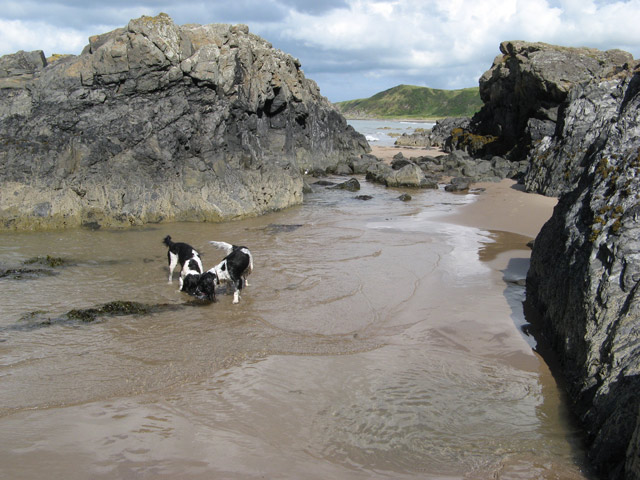
Killantringan or Kilringan Bay, below an ancient Dun

== See also ==
- List of listed buildings in Leswalt, Dumfries and Galloway
