= Lochhouse Tower =

Castle in Dumfries and Galloway, Scotland

- Near Moffat, Dumfries and Galloway, Scotland; UK grid reference NT082033
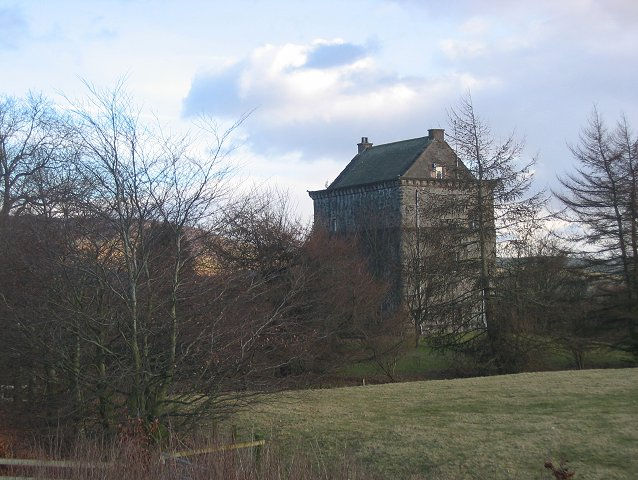
- The tower in 2006

Site information
- Type: Oblong plan Tower house
- Owner: Private
- Open to the public: No
- Condition: Restored as private residence c. 1978

Location
- Shown within Scotland
- Coordinates: 55.315622°N 3.445868°W

Site history
- Built: c. 1550
- Materials: Stone

Lochhouse Tower is a mid-16th-century tower house situated near Moffat, Dumfries and Galloway. It was restored in the late 1970s and is now used as a private residence.
