= Isle Tower =

Architectural structure in Dumfries and Galloway, Scotland

- Bankend, Dumfries and Galloway
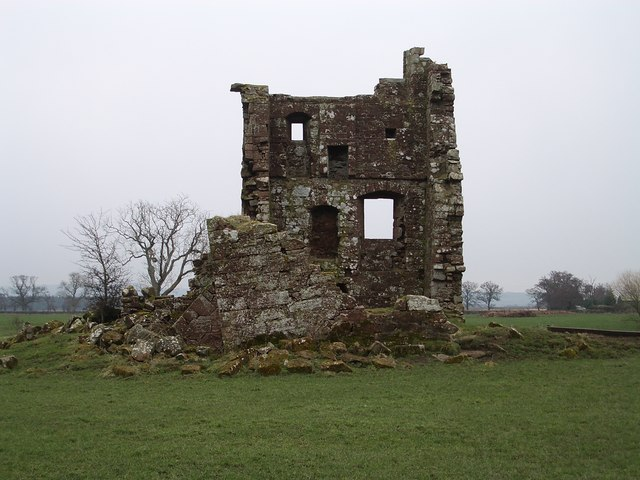

Site information
- Type: Tower house

Location
- Coordinates: 55.005688°N 3.521313°W

Site history
- Built: c. 1565
- In use: Until 1667

Isle Tower also known as Lochar Tower and Bankend Tower is a 16th-century ruined tower house located in the north of Bankend in Dumfries and Galloway, Scotland. It was a property of the Maxwell family.

== History ==
The building is mentioned in a 1560s English report and was built around 1565 at which time William Maxwell was resident. Lord Scrope burned the tower in 1570. William's successor Edward Maxwell of Isle reconstructed the building in 1622, with a stair wing being added to its north east side. It appears to have been abandoned soon after the death of Robert Maxwell, 2nd Earl of Nithsdale in 1667.

The building is in a state of complete ruin, a considerable part of the south west wall having fallen, but the corners as yet remain nearly of their original height. The interior is choked with debris almost as high as the first floor. The castle measures about 29 feet 2 inches by 22 feet, with a staircase tower projecting from the north-west front about 9 feet 4 inches. The doorway is in the re-entering angle, and has the usual bar-hole, with the recess for lamp adjoining. The walls are about 3 feet 4 inches thick, and on the ground floor (which appears to have been vaulted) are pierced with shot-holes on all sides except towards the Lochar Water, where there is a window about 18 inches wide. The shot-holes measure on the exterior 19 inches wide by 6 inches high. The doorway was defended by a hoarding, the corbels for supporting which still remain.

— MacGibbon and Ross, The Castellated and Domestic Architecture of Scotland (1887–1892)

Most of the south east end of the tower had collapsed by the end of the 19th century and the stair wing fell in 1969.
