= Galdenoch Castle =

Scottish castle ruin

Coordinates: 54°55′21″N 5°09′49″W

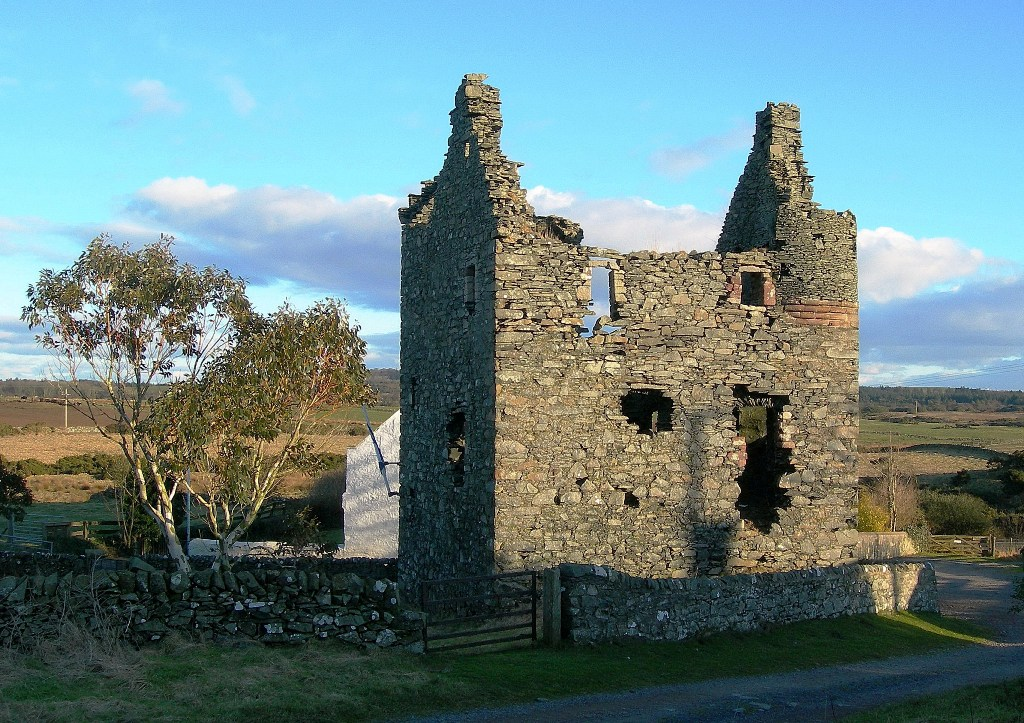
Galdenoch Castle

Galdenoch Castle is a tower house near the Scottish village of Leswalt in the Council Area Dumfries and Galloway. The ruin is listed as a Scheduled Monument.

== Description ==
Galdenoch Castle is isolated on the Rhins of Galloway about 4.5 mi (7.2 km) west of Leswalt. A badge shows the year of construction 1547 and the initials GA. Probably continued the construction for Gilbert Agnew of Lochnaw until 1570. The tower has an L-shaped floor plan. The quarry stone masonry is up to 1.15 m (3 ft 9 in) thick. The interiors have a floor area of with a length of 6.95 m (22.8 ft) and a width of 4.4 m (14 ft). The three-storey building was described as a ruin at the beginning of the 20th century. The walls are partially preserved up to a height of about 10.5 meters, in particular, the western flank is badly damaged.

The entrance portal with relief arch is located inside the building. There are different window openings with falls received. On the southwest side a tourer with three windows cantilevered out. From the once final pitched roof, the gables are preserved. The lowest floor is worked as a stone vault. A narrow spiral staircase in the shorter building wing leads to the upper floors.
