= Lochar Water =

Natural watercourse in Dumfries and Galloway, Scotland

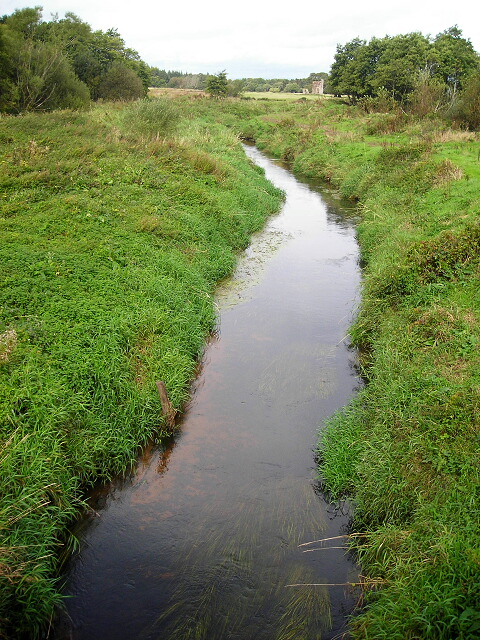

Location
- Country: Scotland

Physical characteristics
- Mouth: Solway Firth
  - coordinates: 54°59′16″N 3°26′02″W
- Length: 29 km (18 mi)

Lochar Water is a stream located in Dumfries and Galloway. It flows for about 10 miles or 16 km, mainly in a southerly direction, roughly parallel to the River Nith to the west and the River Annan to the east. It is formed by the confluence of Park Burn and Amisfield Burn, and skirts the eastern side of the town of Dumfries, and flows through an extensive low-lying area and former raised peat land known as Lochar Moss, before flowing into the Solway Firth. Bankend Bridge, part of the B725 road, crosses Lochar Water on the east side of Bankend village. The tidal limit is about 1 km below that. It shares its name with an electoral ward of the Dumfries and Galloway council
