= Wildfowl & Wetlands Trust =

Charity in the United Kingdom

- Formation: 1946
- Type: Conservation charity
- Headquarters: WWT Slimbridge, Gloucestershire
- Founder: Sir Peter Scott
- Key people: Sarah Fowler (Chief Executive); Kevin Peberdy (Deputy Chief Executive)
- Revenue: ▲£27 million GBP (2022)
- Staff: 420 (2023)
- Volunteers: 881 (2023)
- Website: www.wwt.org.uk

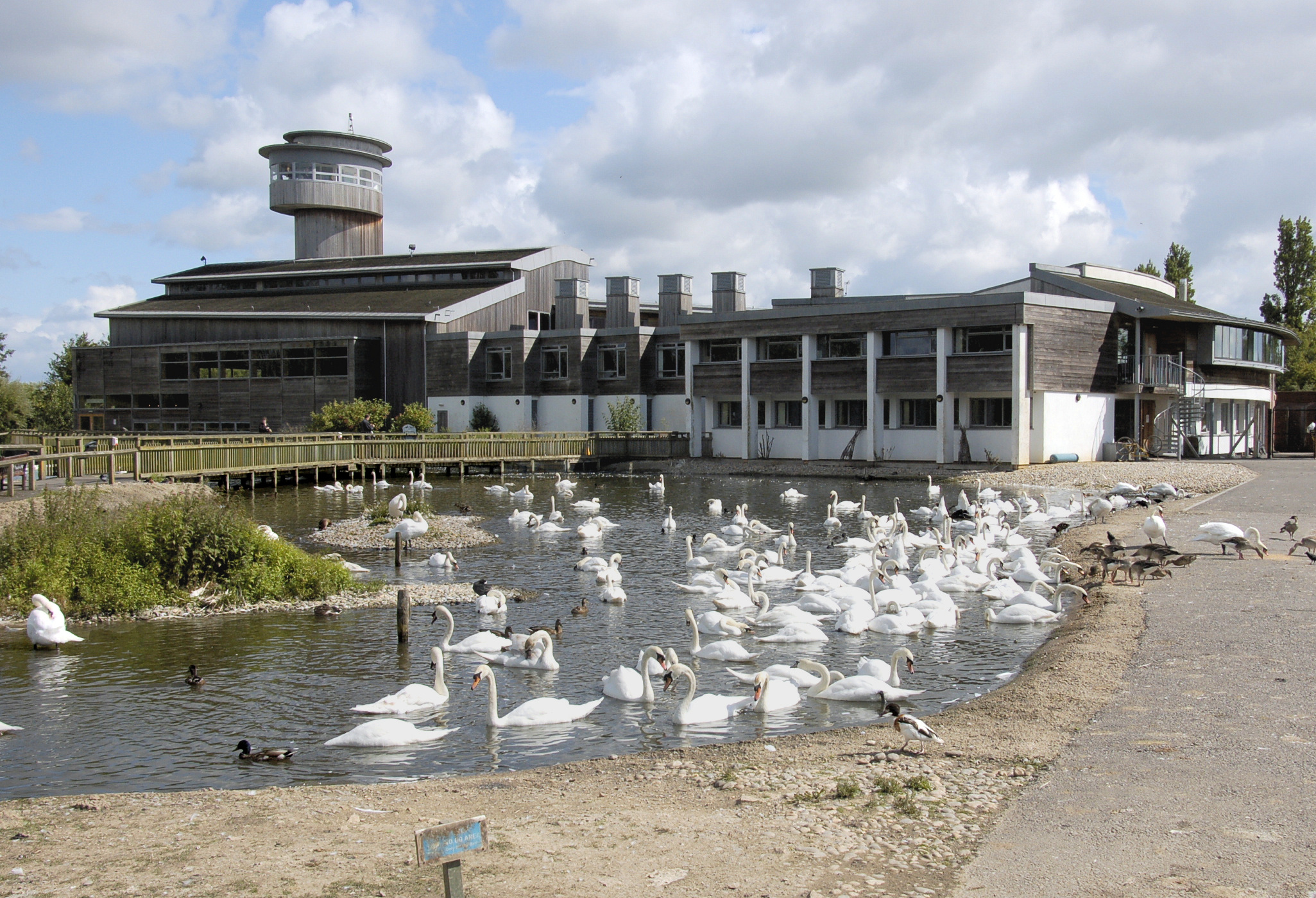
Looking across to the main buildings and Sloane Observation Tower of the trust's headquarters at Slimbridge, Gloucestershire

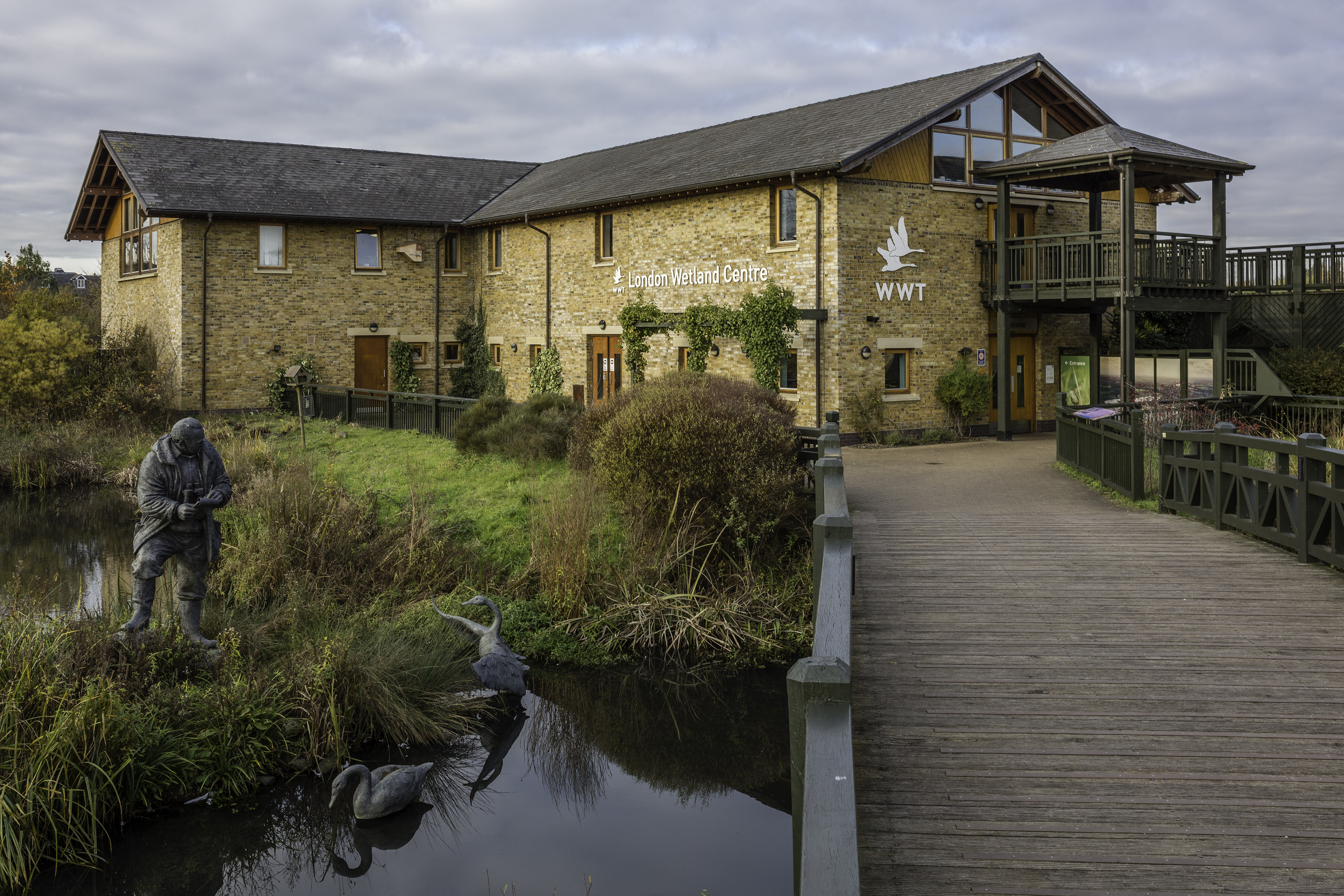
Statue of Sir Peter Scott at WWT London Wetland Centre

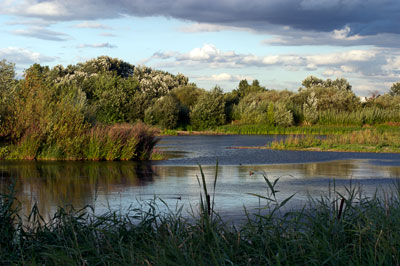
Sheltered Lagoon at the London Wetland Centre

The Wildfowl & Wetlands Trust (WWT) is an international wildfowl and wetland conservation charity in the United Kingdom.

== History ==
The trust was founded in 1946 by the ornithologist and artist Sir Peter Scott as the Severn Wildfowl Trust.

The first site at Slimbridge was a centre for research and conservation. In a move unusual at the time, he opened the site to the public so that everyone could enjoy access to nature.

This organisation later developed into the Wildfowl & Wetlands Trust, the only United Kingdom charity dedicated solely to promoting the protection of wetland birds and their habitats. Although starting out at Slimbridge, the Wildfowl & Wetlands Trust now owns or manages nine other reserves in Britain, and advocates for wetlands and conservation issues world-wide. WWT Consulting was an offshoot of the Wildlife & Wetland Trust and was based at Slimbridge. It provided ecological surveys and assessments, and offered consultancy services in wetland habitat design, wetland management, biological waste-water treatment systems and the management of reserves and their visitor centres. The Queen in later years became patron to the trust, and Prince Charles became the president.

The trust was instrumental in saving the nēnē (Hawaiian goose) from the brink of extinction in the 1950s.

== Nature reserves ==
The trust has over 200,000 members and ten reserves with visitor centres. Together these cover over 20 km^{2} (7.7 sq mi), and support over 150,000 birds. They receive over one million visitors per year. The reserves include seven SSSIs (site of Special Scientific Interest), five SPAs (Special Protection Areas) and five Ramsar sites.

- WWT Arundel, West Sussex
- WWT Caerlaverock, Dumfries and Galloway, Scotland
- WWT Castle Espie, County Down, Northern Ireland
- WWT London Wetland Centre
- WWT Llanelli Wetlands Centre, Carmarthenshire, Wales
- WWT Martin Mere, Lancashire
- WWT Slimbridge, Gloucestershire
- WWT Steart, Somerset
- WWT Washington, Tyne and Wear
- WWT Welney, Norfolk

== Conservation achievements ==
In 1962 the first Nene geese, a species that at that time was threatened with extinction, were returned to Hawaii after a 25-year effort by the Trust, with the species later being downgraded from endangered to threatened on the IUCN Red List.

In 2009 the trust was instrumental in saving the Madagascan Pochard from the brink of extinction in Madagascar. In 2006 a total 20 birds were discovered with the species previously thought to have been extinct. WWT and the Durrell Institute of Conservation and Ecology hatched several clutches of eggs in captivity, and released the 21 birds onto Lake Sofia in 2018.

Together with partners and funders, RSPB, Pensthorpe Conservation Trust, and Viridor Credits, the trust reintroduced Common Cranes to the UK in 2010. The Great Crane Project successfully hand-reared and released 21 Eurasian cranes into the wild in England. The species had been absent in the UK for 400 years. As of 2022 there are over 200 cranes and hatchlings.

WWT's aviculturists started hand-rearing critically endangered spoon-billed sandpiper chicks, and reared 16 in northern Russia in 2013, which boosted the global number of fledglings by 25%.

In 2014 the trust completed its Steart Marshes Project, creating 488 hectares of healthy wetlands which works to defend homes and businesses from flooding in a way that works with nature, not against it.

Lead shot ammunition used for wildfowl shooting was banned in European wetlands in 2020 following WWT's scientific research and a campaign by WWT and partners. The new law came into full effect on 15 February 2023.

== Consultancy ==
At one time, the trust operated a consultancy business that provides external clients with a comprehensive range of wetland services. These included ecological survey and assessment, habitat design and management, visitor centre planning and design, and wetland treatment systems.

== Organisation ==
The Wildfowl & Wetlands Trust is a registered charity in England and Scotland. Sarah Fowler became the chief executive of the trust in March 2022. Her predecessor was Martin Spray, who was appointed in March 2004. In December 2012, Spray was appointed CBE.

=== President ===
- Kate Humble is a writer and broadcaster known for presenting a number of popular television shows which focus on wildlife and rural Britain.

=== Vice Presidents ===
- Mark Carwardine is a zoologist, environmental activist, broadcaster, writer and wildlife photographer.
- Mike Dilger is an ecologist, ornithologist, writer, broadcaster and wildlife presenter on BBC1's The One Show.
- David Lindo, AKA the Urban Birder, is a broadcaster, photographer, speaker, writer and avid birdwatcher.
- Chris Packham is prolific in the world of wildlife and conservation. A broadcaster, nature photographer, author and stalwart BBC nature watch presenter, Chris campaigns tirelessly on a number of wildlife and conservation issues.
- Georgina Susan Fitzalan-Howard, is Duchess of Norfolk.
- Dafila Scott, the daughter of Sir Peter Scott is an artist and zoologist.

=== Ambassadors ===
- Ollie Olanipekun and Nadeem Perera, the founders of Flock Together, who were appointed as WWT's first Ambassadors in 2022. Flock together is a birdwatching collective which recognises that nature is a universal resource and is dedicated to ensuring people of colour feel welcome in it.
- Sir Mark Rylance, an Academy Award winning actor, playwright, theatre director and environmentalist.
- Lucy Hodson aka 'Lucy Lapwing', a wildlife presenter and campaigner working to make the countryside safer for female naturalists and birders.

== See also ==
- Conservation in the United Kingdom
- Index of conservation articles
- Malcolm Ogilvie
- Janet Kear
- Ramsar Convention
- Wetlands International
