= Lochmaben Castle =

Ruined castle in Lochmaben, Scotland

- Lochmaben, Dumfries and Galloway, Scotland; UK grid reference NY088811
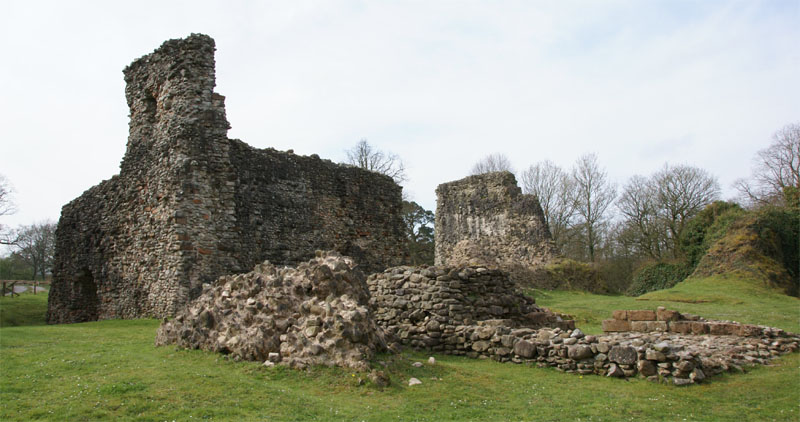
- The castle in 2008

Site information
- Owner: Historic Environment Scotland
- Open to the public: Yes
- Condition: Ruined

Location
- Shown within Dumfries and Galloway
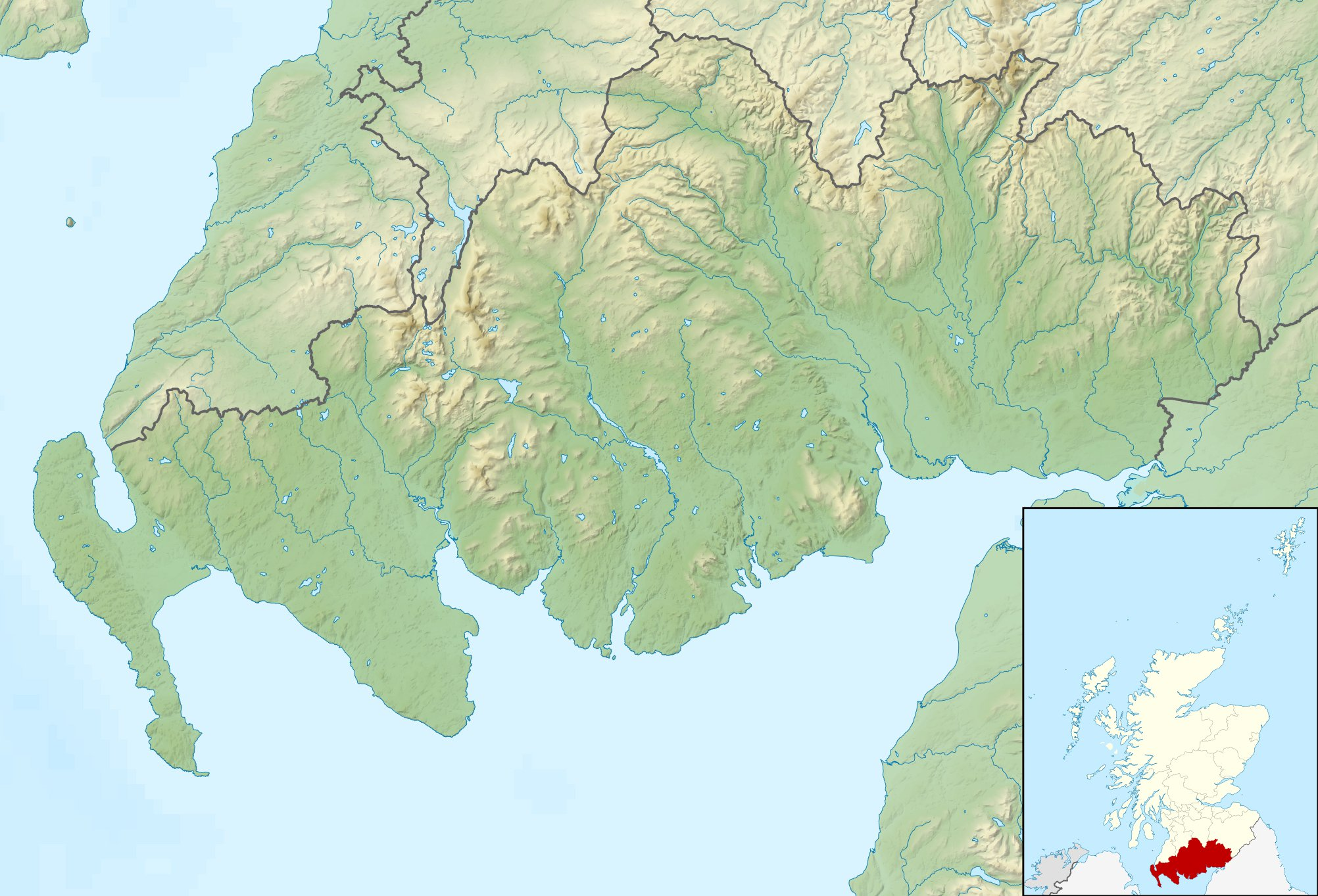
- Location within Dumfries and Galloway
- Coordinates: 55.116287°N 3.429248°W

Site history
- Built: 13th/14th century; rebuilt 1488-1513
- Built by: Edward I
- Materials: Stone

Lochmaben Castle is a ruined castle in the town of Lochmaben, the feudal Lordship of Annandale, and the united county of Dumfries and Galloway. It was built by Edward I in the 14th century replacing an earlier motte and bailey castle, and later rebuilt during the reign of James IV of Scotland. The earlier motte-and-bailey castle was built south of the current castle in c. 1160 by the Bruce family, Lords of Annandale.

== History ==
King Edward replaced the older motte and bailey castle with a much sturdier structure at the south end of Castle Loch around 1300 and its remains still show the massive strength of its defences. Archibald Douglas, Lord of Galloway, with the assistance of the Earls of March and Douglas, after a siege of nine days, took Lochmaben Castle from the English and "razed it to the ground" on 4 February 1383/4. The castle and barony became a possession of the Earls of March, but when the 10th Earl was forfeited and then reinstated, in 1409, it is noted that it was "with the exception of the castle of Lochmaben and the Lordship of Annandale" which by July 1455 was in the possession of Alexander Stewart, Duke of Albany. Following his death in 1485 both the Lordship and the castle were annexed to the Crown by Act of Parliament dated 1 October 1487.

A mason called Gluffar built a hall at the castle in 1504 and it was roofed with local timber. James IV visited and played cards with Lord Dacre on 23 August 1504. On 16 January 1509 Robert Lauder of The Bass was appointed Captain and Keeper of Lochmaben for three years. He was reappointed for seven years in March 1512. James V of Scotland was at Lochmaben in November 1542, and watched fires started by the Scottish army from Burnswark Hill. After learning of the defeat at the battle of Solway Moss, he returned to Stirling Castle.

As Lord Maxwell had allowed the English to garrison his castles in the war of the Rough Wooing, Regent Arran besieged Lochmaben in November 1545. James Crawford brought artillery to the siege from Edinburgh Castle, and Arran gave drinksilver rewards to three gunners. Arran's forces took the castle on 28 November 1545. Mary, Queen of Scots and Lord Darnley came to Lochmaben in October 1565 at the conclusion of the Chaseabout Raid.

Regent Moray sent an army to the south west against the supporters of Mary, Queen of Scots. Lochmaben surrendered on 23 June 1568 and a garrison under the keeping of James Douglas of Drumlanrig was installed. Some supporters of Lord Maxwell were hidden in the castle and they overpowered Douglas's men on the 24 June.

In 1588, the castle was held by Lord Maxwell, seeking to overthrow the Protestant monarchy. In response James VI besieged Lochmaben with the assistance of English forces. Gunpowder was sent from Edinburgh. The keeper David Maxwell and five others were hanged, despite the efforts of William Stewart of Monkton to negotiate a surrender. One of the king's soldiers was shot in the leg.

In June 1592 it was said that Francis Stewart, 5th Earl of Bothwell dressed as a woman, had managed to infiltrate and capture the castle, which was kept by Sir John Carmichael, as part of an uprising against James VI. The castle was soon returned to crown control.

In 1605 the Depute Lieutenant of the Borders, Sir William Cranstoun of that Ilk (later 1st Lord Cranstoun), was Keeper of Lochmaben Castle.

Lochmaben Castle remained important and had a turbulent history until some time after the early 17th century by which time it had seen its last siege and was gradually abandoned. King James allocated £1,600 sterling for repairs in 1624 but nothing seems to have been done. The castle is now protected as a scheduled monument.

Lord Mansfield, the Earl of Mansfield, is the Hereditary Keeper of Bruce’s Castle of Lochmaben.

== Popular culture ==
The castle features in the 1810 novel The Scottish Chiefs by Jane Porter, a Romantic historical novel written in the Regency era.

== Gallery ==
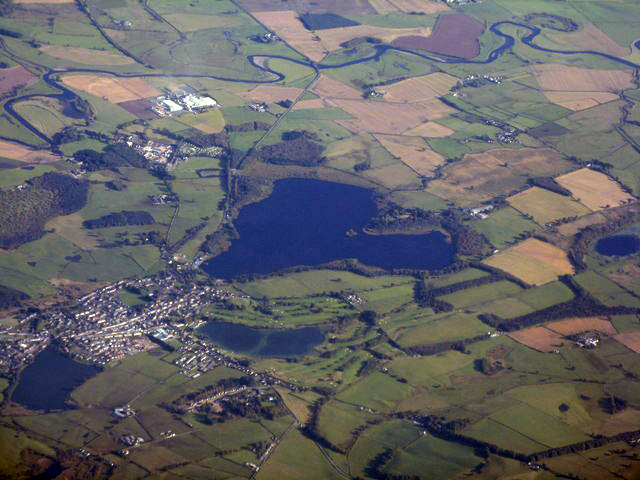
Lochmaben - aerial view

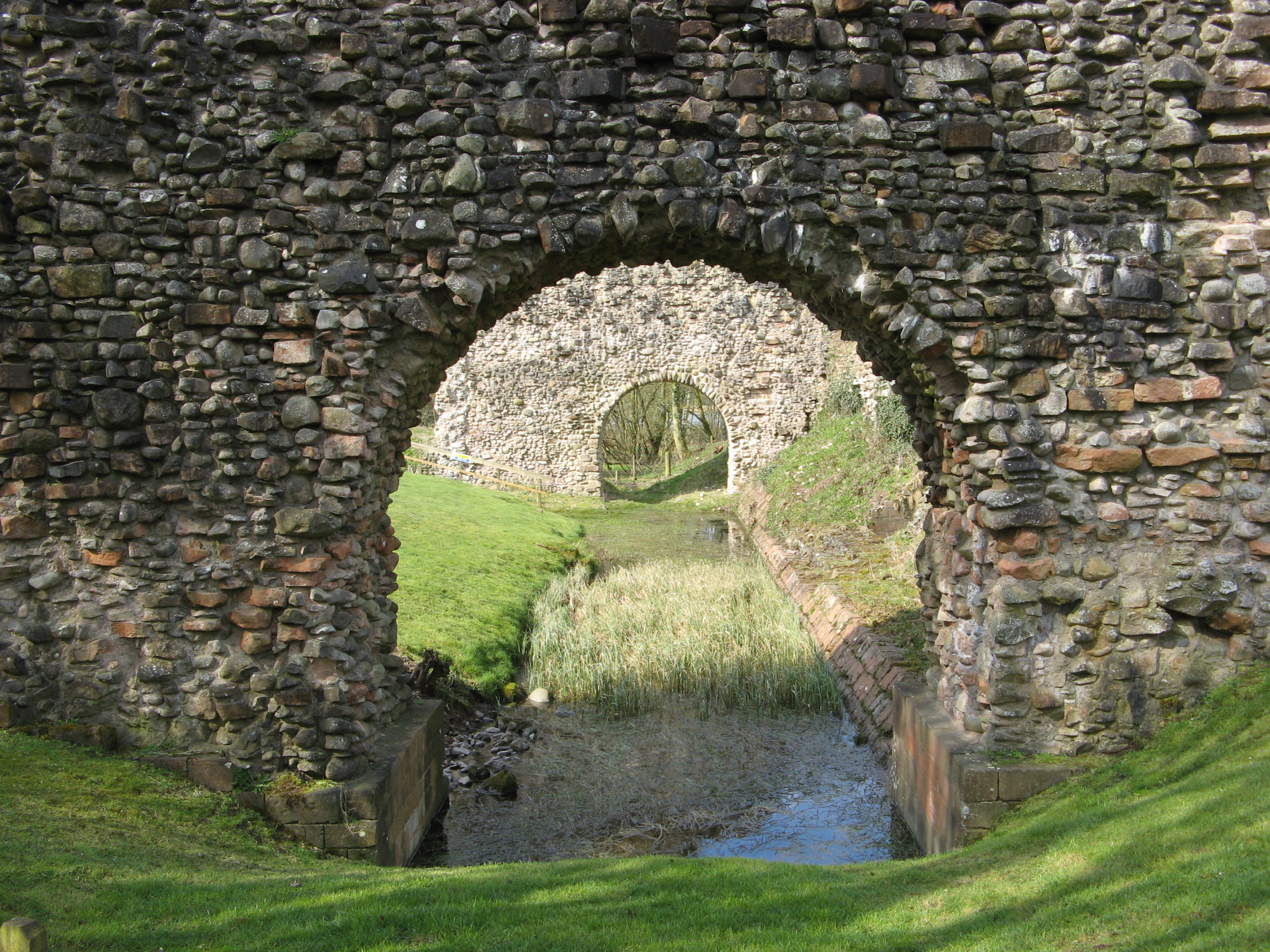
View west along the moat

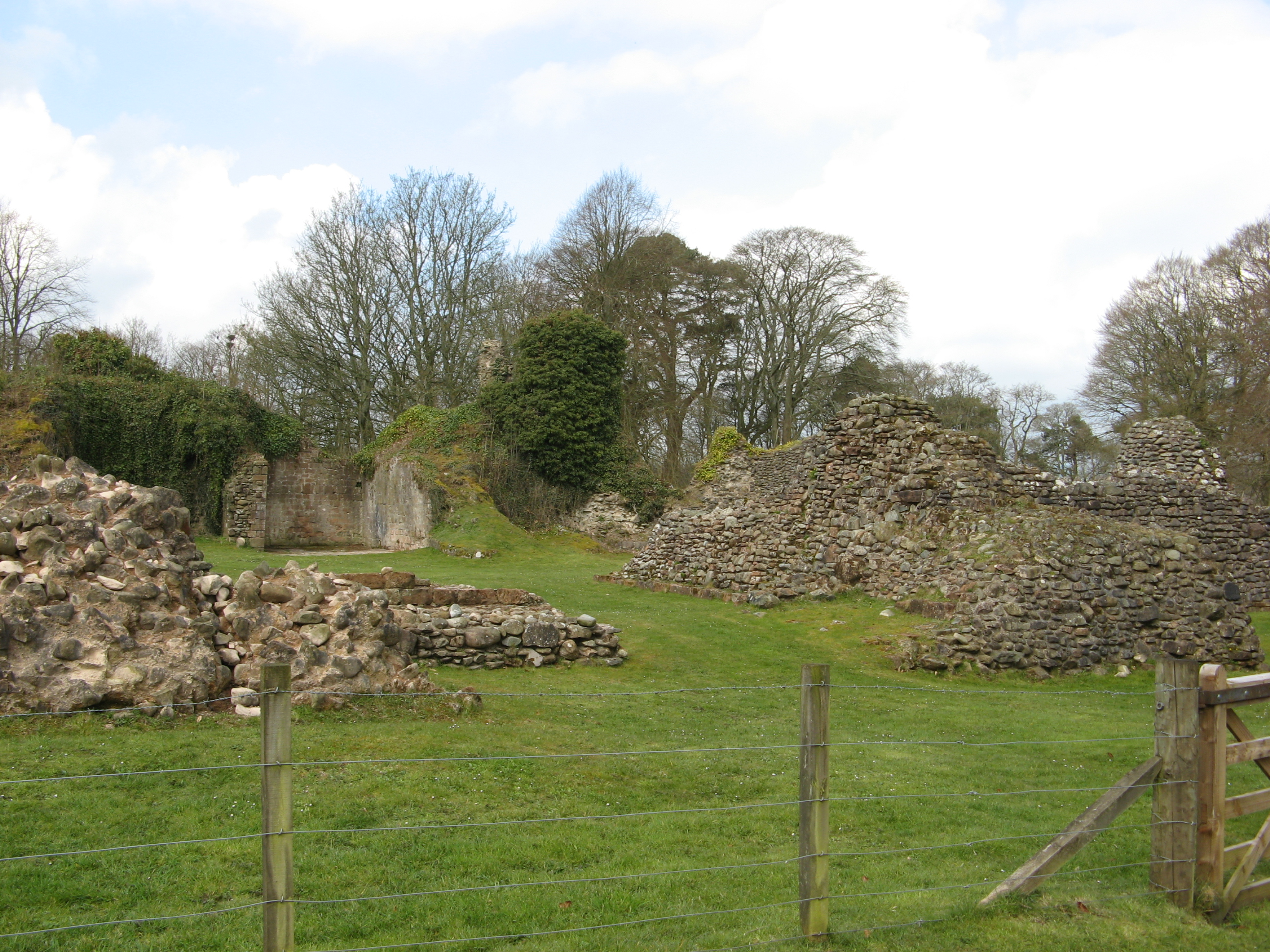
Interior section of the ruins, looking west

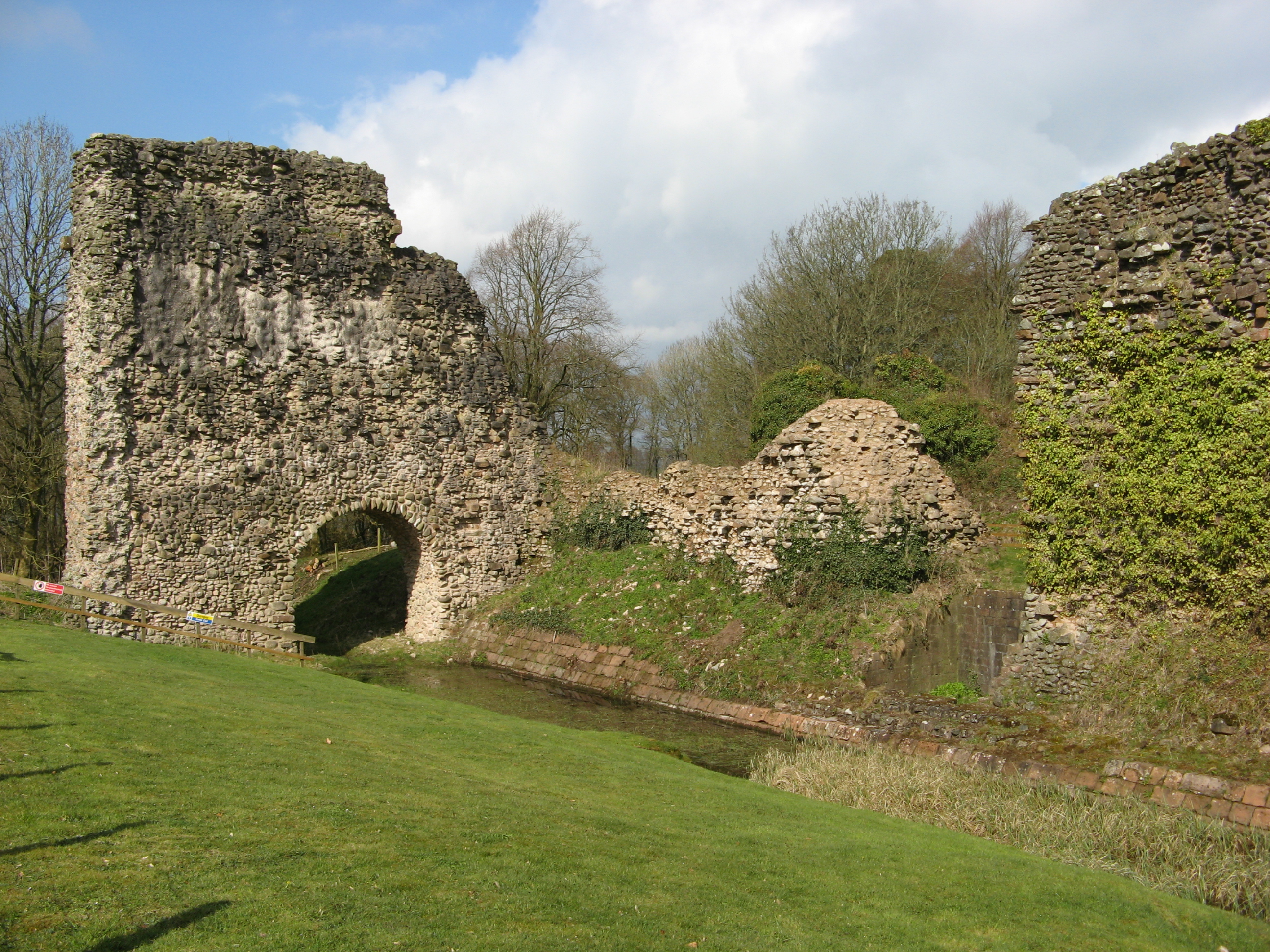
View from the south showing entrance, moat and drawbridge pit.

== Additional Reading ==
- Coventry, Martin (2001) The Castles of Scotland, 3rd Ed. Scotland: Goblinshead ISBN 1-899874-26-7
