= Barmkin =

Form of medieval and later defensive enclosure; Scots word

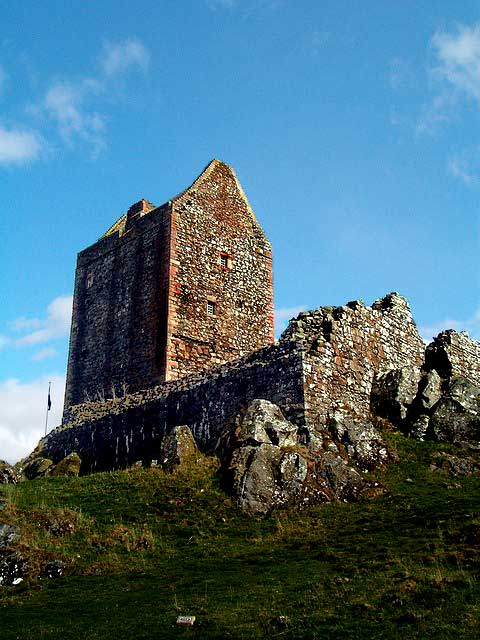
Smailholm Tower, showing the barmkin wall in the foreground

Barmkin, also spelled barmekin or barnekin, is a Scots word which refers to a form of medieval and later defensive enclosure, typically found around smaller castles, tower houses, pele towers, and bastle houses in Scotland and the north of England. It has been suggested that etymologically the word may be a corruption of the word barbican or berm. The barmkin would have contained ancillary buildings, and could be used to protect cattle during raids.

In 1535 a Parliament of James V of Scotland enacted that "every landed man dwelling in the inland or upon the borders having there a hundred pound land of new extent shall build a sufficient barmkin upon his heritage and lands in the most suitable place, of stone and lime, containing three score foot of the square, one ell thick and six ells high, for the protection and defence of him, his tenants and their goods in troublesome times, with a tower in the same for himself if he thinks it expedient."

Places which had barmkins include Halton Castle, Cheshire, Smailholm Tower, Scottish Borders, and Crichton Castle, Midlothian. The barmkin survives at Hills Tower in Dumfries and Galloway.

== Other uses ==
The "Barmekin of Echt", near the village of Echt, Aberdeenshire, is a prehistoric hill fortification, comprising five circular stone defensive walls on a hilltop. While it is locally known as the 'Barmekin' of Echt, architecturally it is not related in any manner to a barmkin.

== See also ==
- Bawn
- Curtain wall (fortification)
