= Old Lochmaben Castle =

Castle in Dumfries and Galloway, Scotland

Coordinates: 55.1257°N 3.4410°W

Lochmaben Castle was a 12th-century castle on the spit of land between Loch Kirk and Loch Castle, in Lochmaben, Scotland.

The motte and bailey castle was built in the 12th century by the de Brus family, Lords of Annandale. The castle became the main seat of the de Brus family after Annan Castle was partially destroyed during a flood in the 12th century. The castle was captured in 1298 by King Edward I of England. King Edward began to make improvements to the castle, before deciding to build "New" Lochmaben Castle as a replacement in the 14th century, to the south-east.
