= Warenne Check =

Symbol of Warenne family and Earl of Warenne

Escutcheon of the House of Warenne

Warenne Check or Checky is a heraldic checkerboard pattern of blue and gold squares. It is a signature emblem of the Warenne family and the Earls of Warenne, and a defining feature of the Warenne coat of arms.

In formal heraldic terminology, the pattern is described as chequy Or and Azure, meaning a field divided into alternating gold (Or) and blue (Azure) squares.

Warenne Check is often used to denote a connection to the Warenne family, and appears in the coat of arms of numerous institutions related to the family.

It is also one of the historical heraldic emblems associated with the English county of Surrey, and features in the Flag of Surrey. Warenne Check has influenced the heraldic designs of institutions associated with the county.

Flag of Surrey

== History ==
Warenne Check was first adopted as the Warenne coat of arms in 1118. William de Warenne, 2nd Earl of Warenne adopted arms similar to those of the Counts of Vermandois upon his marriage to Elizabeth of Vermandois, Dowager Countess of Leicester.

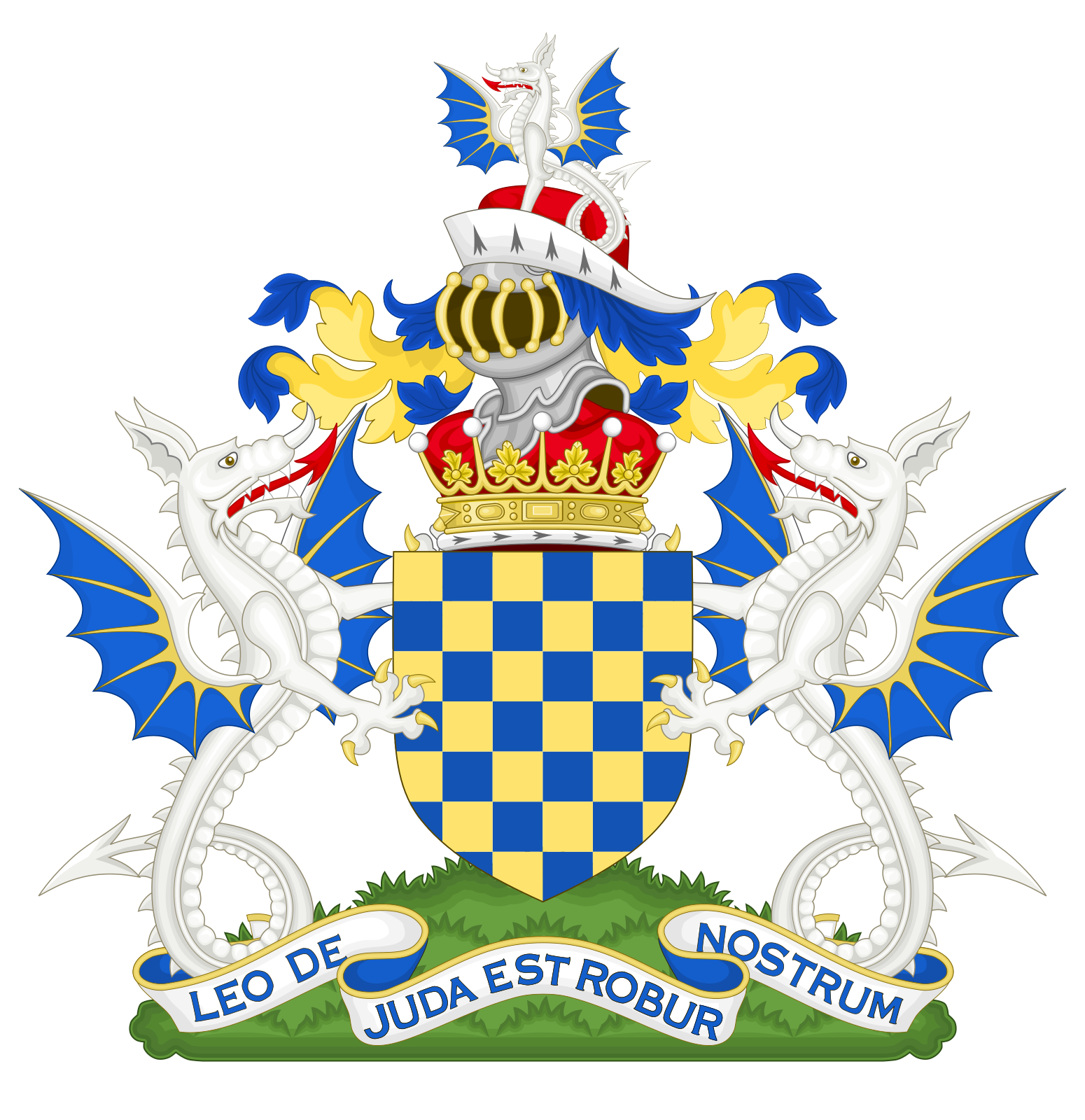
Coat of arms of the Earl of Warenne

The pattern is documented on the seal of John de Warenne, 6th Earl of Warenne, which was used for the Barons' Letter of 1301 to Pope Boniface VIII. The UK National Archives identifies the squares on the seal as the gold-and-blue chequerboard of his coat of arms.

The Warenne arms also appear in medieval rolls of arms. Their use is particularly notable in the Roll of Caerlaverock, a poem describing the English participants and their heraldic devices during the siege of Caerlaverock Castle in 1300. The poem describes the Earl of Surrey's banner as chequered in gold and azure.

== Gallery ==
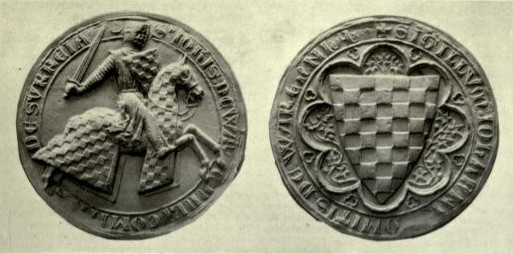
Seal of John de Warenne, 6th Earl of Warenne

York Minster Window

Reigate and Banstead Borough Council Coat of Arms

The heraldic badge of Surrey Herald of Arms Extraordinary

== See also ==
- Check (pattern)
- Checkerboard
- Warenne family
- Count of Vermandois
- Flag of Surrey
- Reigate
