= Flag of Surrey =

Flag of English county

County of Surrey
- Adopted: September 11, 2014; 12 years ago
- County Council Flag
- Adopted: August 16, 2014; 12 years ago

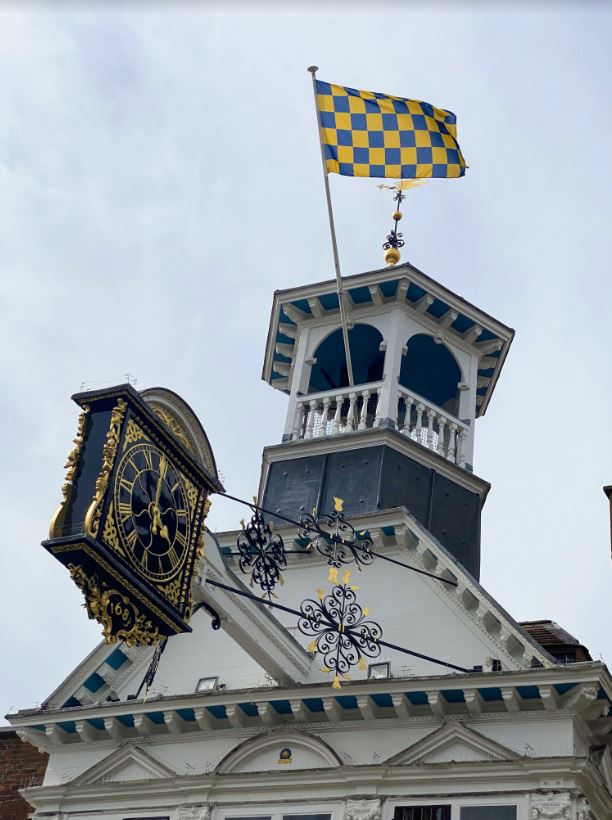
Flag of Surrey flying over Guildford Guildhall, 2022

The flag of Surrey is the blue and gold chequered flag of the traditional county of Surrey and is derived from the coat of arms of William de Warenne, 2nd Earl of Surrey who adopted arms similar of the Capetian Count of Vermandois on his marriage to Elizabeth, Countess of Leicester (died 1138), who was first married to Robert de Beaumont, 1st Earl of Leicester. She was a younger daughter of Hugh I, Count of Vermandois (1057–1102). Similar arms were also adopted by his brother in law, Ralph I de Beaugency, who married Hugh I's oldest daughter, Matilda. (heraldic blazon: Chequy Or and Azur).

The Surrey flag was officially registered as a "traditional design" by the Flag Institute on 11 September 2014 following research by Philip Tibbetts on behalf of the Association of British Counties, which showed that the county was linked to an emblem of antiquity. Prior to this date, the county had no official flag but the banner of the coat of arms of Surrey County Council was frequently used instead.

== Design ==
The flag is a blue and gold checkerboard, based on the coat of arms of William de Warenne, 2nd earl of Surrey. The grid is 10x6, making the flag in a 3:5 ratio.

=== Colours ===
| Scheme | Blue | Gold |
| Refs | | |
|---|---|---|
| Pantone (paper) | 286 C | 116 C |
| HEX | #0033A0 | #FFCD00 |
| CMYK | 100, 68, 0, 37 | 0, 20, 100, 0 |
| RGB | 0, 51, 160 | 255, 205, 0 |

== History ==
The Surrey flag is a representation of the arms originally used as a personal heraldic device by William de Warenne, second Earl of Surrey, that has had a long association with the county itself, as attested to in a 17th-century poem about the Battle of Agincourt. An early reference of the arms is found in the 13th-century Glover's Roll of Arms, where an account of the siege of Caerlaverock Castle (from 1300) describes the actions of John de Warenne, 6th Earl of Surrey and includes a reference to his banner of blue and gold cheques: "his banner with gold and azure, was nobly chequered”. The de Warenne family became extinct in the male line in 1347 but, importantly, there is evidence the design continued to be used by the men of the county, as found in a poem about the Battle of Agincourt in 1415 by Michael Drayton (written in 1627) which records the men of Surrey carrying a banner of gold and blue checks into battle in honour of their late earl,

"The men of Surrey, Checky Blew and gold, (Which for brave Warren their first Earle they wore".

The 'De Warenne Cheques' are also remembered in a map by John Speed of the county of Surrey dating from 1610 and they were then adopted in various civic heraldic devices during the 19th and 20th centuries, including an heraldic badge in 1981 for the Surrey Herald Extraordinary.

By 2014 all counties in the southeast of England had flags but Surrey, with most adopting traditional designs. Philip Tibbetts, on behalf of the Association of British Counties (ABC), found the gold and blue checkerboard to be a longstanding symbol of Surrey. The ABC collaborated with local parish councils to campaign for the flags registration with the Flag Institute, the independent body that determines vexillological matters in the United Kingdom.

== Arms ==
Coat of arms of the capetian counts of Vermandois

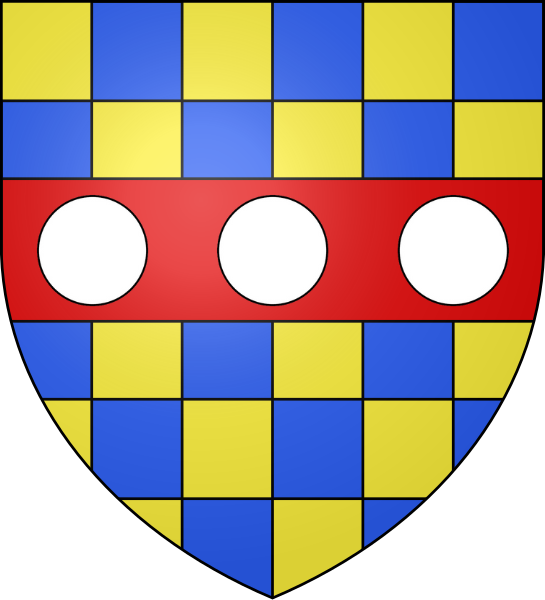
Similar arms were used by the de Beaugency family, lords of Beaugency

The heraldic badge of Surrey Herald of Arms Extraordinary

== See also ==
- Warenne Check
- Warenne family
