= John Maxwell, 4th Lord Maxwell =

Scottish nobleman

John Maxwell, 4th Lord Maxwell (died 9 September 1513) was a Scottish nobleman and patriarch of the Border Family / House / Clan of Maxwell.

== Origins ==
Maxwell was the eldest son and heir of John Maxwell, 3rd Lord Maxwell (died 1484) and Janet, the daughter of George Crichton, 1st Earl of Caithness. The Maxwells were an ancient House / Family from the Scottish Borders, whose chief seat was at Caerlaverock Castle near Dumfries.

== Career ==
Maxwell was infefted in his grandfather's lands at Carnsalloch on 8 May 1485 and was served heir to his father in the lands of Maxwell on 29 April 1486. In 1486 he was also appointed Warden of the West Marches. In October 1488 he attended the first Parliament of James IV.

The most notorious incident of Maxwell's career was his violent assault on 30 July 1508 on Robert Crichton, 2nd Lord Crichton of Sanquhar outside the court-house in Dumfries, where Crichton was holding assizes. The Maxwells and Crichtons had long competed for influence in Nithsdale and, accompanied by William Douglas of Drumlanrig, Maxwell led a considerable force into the town from the south. Bishop Lesley provided the following summary of subsequent events: "Lord Creychton was chaissit with his company frae Drumfries, and the Laird of Dalyell and the young laird of Cranchlay slain, with divers uthers, quhairof thair appeared greit deidly feid and blushed". It appears that Maxwell went largely unpunished for his part in this episode.

Maxwell was one of the many Scottish nobles killed in the Battle of Flodden on 9 September 1513.

== Family ==
Maxwell married (in 1491 or 1492) Agnes, the daughter of Sir Alexander Stewart of Garlies. She was still living on 25 July 1530. They had at least nine children:

- Robert Maxwell, 5th Lord Maxwell Regent of the Isle of Arran, Warden of the West Marches. Lord High Admiral, Lord Provost of Edinburgh, Extraordinary Lord of Session and one of the members of the council of Regency
- Herbert Maxwell, ancestor of the Maxwells of Clowden
- John Maxwell, who was Abbot of Dundrennan in 1524
- Edward Maxwell, who was still living on 6 June 1540
- Mary Maxwell, who married James Johnstone of that Ilk
- Agnes Maxwell, who married Robert Charteris of Amisfield
- Isobel Maxwell, who married Laird Robert Porterfield
- Katherine Maxwell, who married Ninian Glendoning of Parton.
- Elizabeth Maxwell, who married Sir Alexander Jardine of Applegirth

Maxwell is also known to have had two illegitimate sons, Henry and John.

Peerage of Scotland
Preceded by John Maxwell	Lord Maxwell c. 1484–1513	Succeeded by Robert Maxwell
