= John Maxwell, 9th Lord Maxwell =

Scottish nobleman

John Maxwell, 9th Lord Maxwell (c. 1583 – 21 May 1613) was a Scottish Catholic nobleman. He escaped from Edinburgh Castle in 1607, and in 1608 shot the Laird of Johnstone. For these crimes, he was executed and his titles were forfeit.

== Biography ==
The noble house of Maxwell had held the castle of Caerlaverock near Dumfries since the 13th century, and by the mid-16th century were the most powerful family in south-west Scotland. John Maxwell was the first son of John Maxwell, 8th Lord Maxwell (died 1593) and his wife Elizabeth Douglas (d.1637), daughter of the 7th Earl of Angus.

His father was killed in a fight with the Johnstones of Annandale. He continued the feud – killing several Johnstones at Dalfeble in 1602 – until 1605 when he made peace with the Laird of Johnstone. His father had also been created Earl of Morton in 1581, and continued to be so styled, despite Archibald Douglas, 8th Earl of Angus (1555–1588), being confirmed as 5th Earl of Morton in 1586. John Maxwell subsequently quarrelled with the 7th Earl of Morton, and he was barred by the Privy Council from attending Parliament in 1607. Despite this, he appeared in Parliament and challenged the Earl of Morton, for which he was imprisoned in Edinburgh Castle. He escaped in October and fled to Dumfriesshire, where he arranged to meet the Laird of Johnstone in April 1608. During the meeting, at which both parties had given their word of truce, Johnstone was shot in the back and killed by Maxwell. He fled to France, but was convicted in his absence of treason, as well as of other killings and the escape from Edinburgh Castle. He was sentenced to death and his titles forfeit. On his return to Scotland in 1612 he was arrested, and attempted to make peace with the Johnstones by proposing a marriage between the two families. This was unsuccessful and he was beheaded at Edinburgh on 21 May 1613. The traditional ballad "Lord Maxwell's Last Goodnight" is based on his actions.

In 1597 he had married Margaret Hamilton, daughter of John Hamilton, 1st Marquess of Hamilton and Margaret Lyon but the couple quarrelled and had no surviving children. His brother Robert was restored as 10th Lord Maxwell in 1617, and was created Earl of Nithsdale in 1620.

Peerage of Scotland
Preceded by John Maxwell	Lord Maxwell; 1593–1609	Forfeit Title next held by Robert Maxwell
