= Robert Maxwell, 5th Lord Maxwell =

Scottish nobleman (1493–1546)

Robert Maxwell, 5th Lord Maxwell (1493 – 9 July 1546) was a Scottish nobleman, politician and soldier who was a member of the Council of Regency (1536) of the Kingdom of Scotland and Regent of the Isle of Arran. He was Lord High Admiral of Scotland in 1513 and Lord Provost of Edinburgh in 1524, 1527 and 1535. He was also an Extraordinary Lord of Session in 1533. In 1537, he was one of the ambassadors sent to the French Court to negotiate the marriage of King James V to Mary of Guise, whom he espoused as proxy for the king. Like his father John Maxwell, 4th Lord Maxwell before him, he was a patriarch of the Clan Maxwell.

== Life ==
Robert was the eldest son of John Maxwell, 4th Lord Maxwell (killed at the Battle of Flodden, 9 September 1513) and Agnes Stewart, the daughter of Sir Alexander Stewart of Garlies.

At the time of Flodden, Maxwell was admiral of a fleet which was proposed to go to France, but which on the voyage was driven back and only arrived at Kirkcudbright on the day after the battle. After the battle of Flodden, Robert returned as heir to his father on 4 November 1513. Around this time, he was also bestowed as Regent of Arran, the largest island in the Firth of Clyde, making the 5th Lord Maxwell essentially Monarch of the Island. Although others would achieve highly respected noble titles in the distinguished line of the House of Maxwell, none would match that of 5th Lord Maxwell's success. Not much is known about his reign as Regent other than he didn't spend much time on the Island. Maxwell immediately afterwards seized Lochmaben and, on 26 November, he was appointed captain and keeper of Threave Castle. On the forfeiture of Alexander Home, 3rd Lord Home in 1516, Maxwell acquired part of his lands and, in the following year, was made warden of the west marches.

In February 1516, Margaret Tudor, the widow of James IV, granted Lord Maxwell the office of Stewart of Kirkcudbright, and confirmed his keepership of Threave Castle.

After the return to Scotland of Archibald Douglas, 6th Earl of Angus, husband of the dowager queen Margaret Tudor, Maxwell became one of the queen's party. He was concerned in the removal of the young king James V from Stirling to Edinburgh on 26 July 1524, and on 18 August was made Lord Provost of Edinburgh. Maxwell took part in the scheme for the king's nominal assumption of the government in November, with the advice of the King's mother. He was then appointed as one of the council to assist her in the government. The queen's divorce from Angus changed the attitude of Maxwell, as well as other nobles, towards her. Upon the king attaining his majority of fourteen years on 21 June 1526, Maxwell became one of the council appointed to assist Angus in the guardianship of the king and the management of affairs. He was in company with the king at the Battle of Melrose on 25 July, when an unsuccessful attempt was made by Walter Scott of Branxholme and Buccleuch to get possession of him. The same year he was appointed steward of Kirkcudbright and keeper of Thrieve.

Upon the escape of the king from Falkland Palace to Stirling in July 1528, Maxwell separated himself from the party of Angus and was chosen a member of the new council. Having accompanied the king to Edinburgh, he was again made lord provost of the city and, on 26 August, frustrated an attempt by Angus to take possession of it. Maxwell was one of the jurors in the trial of Angus, and upon his forfeiture received a portion of his lands.

Like most of the southern nobles, Maxwell gave his indirect countenance to the border raiders, as well as engaging in raids on his own account. In 1528 he had been compelled by Angus to make compensation to the English for burning Netherby, and this probably was the reason for his hostility to Angus. In the following year, when the king determined to make a progress southwards to punish raiders, it was deemed advisable to place Maxwell and other sympathisers with them in ward in Edinburgh Castle, but after the king's return, they were released on giving pledges for their allegiance. The execution of Johnnie Armstrong, who was partly under his protection, was especially distasteful to Maxwell, but he afterwards became reconciled to the king, and on 17 November 1533 was appointed an extraordinary lord of session. During an excursion into England in 1536, he burned Penrith. The same year he was appointed one of the ruling regents during the absence of King James on his matrimonial expedition to France.

After the death of the king's first wife, Madeleine of Valois, Maxwell was sent in December 1537 with other ambassadors to conclude a treaty of marriage with the recently widowed Mary of Guise. Maxwell acted as the king's proxy, bringing a diamond spousing ring which cost 300 crowns for the marriage ceremony at the Château de Châteaudun on 9 May 1538.

Maxwell was, for a time, keeper of Hermitage Castle, and in February 1540 was paid £100 Scots for making repairs at Hermitage. Maxwell, as high admiral, commanded an expedition to the Orkney Islands in 1540. He joined the army which assembled on the Borough Muir of Edinburgh in October 1542 and, having in vain urged that battle should be given to the English, after its disbandment he took the principal part in raising a force for a new expedition. In command of ten thousand men, he proceeded to the western borders but, just before the encounter with the English at the Battle of Solway Moss, a warrant was produced by Oliver Sinclair, authorising him to assume the chief command. In the confusion, little resistance was made to the English, and Maxwell was captured, perhaps deliberately. Along with other captive nobles, he was sent to London - Eustace Chapuys wrote that Maxwell and 23 Scottish gentlemen were brought to the Tower of London on 20 December, and the next day were released to be billeted in houses of London gentry.

The death of James V in December somewhat changed Henry VIII's policy. The captive nobles were permitted to return to Scotland upon paying a ransom and entering into a bond to aid the English king, by force if necessary, in his scheme for a marriage of Prince Edward with the young queen, Mary Stuart. Maxwell was at Carlisle in March 1543 and was able to write to the King's widow, queen Mary of Guise, to arrange the passage of her French servants who took messages on to the Duke of Suffolk at Newcastle. Suffolk was told that Guise was favourable to the marriage plan.

Cardinal Beaton, who opposed the marriage to the heir of a Protestant country, was detained. Maxwell showed his hostility to Beaton by proposing, and getting passed, an act that all should have liberty to read the Bible in the Scots and English tongues. Along with Hugh Somerville, 5th Lord Somerville, he was one of the chief agents of Angus in his intrigues with Henry VIII. On the last day of October 1543, Maxwell and Somerville were captured by John Hamilton, the Abbot of Paisley, while in Edinburgh carrying letters to Gilbert Kennedy, 3rd Earl of Cassilis and William Cunningham, 4th Earl of Glencairn. Maxwell was imprisoned in Edinburgh Castle.

Upon obtaining his liberty, Maxwell joined Matthew Stewart, 4th Earl of Lennox in Glasgow Castle, and was taken prisoner at its capture during the battle of Glasgow, 1 April 1544. He was released on 3 May 1544, on the approach of the English fleet to Leith roads, in case his friends or followers should ally with the English.

Having now excited the suspicions of Henry as to his fidelity, he was taken prisoner and sent to the Tower of London. Thereupon he offered to serve under the Earl of Hertford, with a red cross on his armour as a symbol of his devotion to England. However, in August 1545 he remained imprisoned at Pontefract Castle, and only in October 1545 was he allowed to return to Scotland, on delivering Caerlaverock Castle into English keeping. Early in November, his castles were captured by Beaton and he was conveyed a prisoner to Dumfries; but, having affirmed that he had only made terms with Henry in fear of his life, on 12 January 1546 Maxwell received a remission, and was at the same time made chief justice of Annandale. On 3 June 1546, he was appointed warden of the west marches. He died on 9 July of the same year.

== Family ==
Robert and his first wife, Janet Douglas, daughter of Sir William Douglas of Drumlanrig, had three children:

- Robert Maxwell, 6th Lord Maxwell
- Sir John Maxwell, married Agnes Maxwell, 4th Lady Herries of Terregles
- Margaret, married firstly to Archibald Douglas, 6th Earl of Angus, and secondly to Sir William Baillie of Lamington

His second wife was Lady Agnes Stewart, illegitimate daughter of James Stewart, 1st Earl of Buchan, second son to Sir James Stewart, the Black Knight of Lorne, and Joan Beaufort, Queen of Scots (c. 1404 – 15 July 1445), the widow of James I of Scotland. Lady Agnes Stewart was later legitimized by Queen Mary of Guise, on 31 October 1552, under the Great Seal of Scotland.

== Depictions in popular culture ==
Portrayed by the actor James Sutherland, Robert Maxwell, the 5th lord Maxwell makes a brief appearance in the television series The Tudors. He appears in season 4 episode 6 entitled "You Have My Permission". In the show, he is only ever referred to as Lord Maxwell.

== Notes ==
Peerage of Scotland
Preceded by John Maxwell	Lord Maxwell; 1513–1546	Succeeded by Robert Maxwell
