= John Maxwell, 8th Lord Maxwell =

Scottish Roman Catholic nobleman

John Maxwell, 8th Lord Maxwell (24 April 1553 – 7 December 1593) was a Scottish Catholic nobleman. In 1581 he was created Earl of Morton, and in 1587 he travelled to Spain where he took part in the planning of the Spanish Armada.

== Biography ==
The noble House of Maxwell had held the castle of Caerlaverock near Dumfries since the 13th century, and by the mid-16th century were the most powerful family in south-west Scotland. John Maxwell was the second son of Robert Maxwell, 6th Lord Maxwell (died 13 September 1552) and his wife Beatrix Douglas, daughter of James Douglas, 3rd Earl of Morton. He was born seven months after his father's death, and succeeded as 8th Lord Maxwell at the age of two, following the death of his brother Robert at the age of four.

In 1581, James Douglas, 4th Earl of Morton, was convicted of the murder of Lord Darnley in 1567 and executed, and his titles forfeit. On 29 October 1581, James Maxwell was created Earl of Morton, with the subsidiary title Lord Carlyle and Eskdale, and he received the lands of Morton in a charter the same year. In 1585, his rights to the lands were revoked, although he apparently retained the right to use the title. He was styled Earl of Morton until his death, despite Archibald Douglas, 8th Earl of Angus (1555–1588), being confirmed as 5th Earl of Morton in 1586.

Maxwell served on the Privy Council of Scotland, and as Warden of the West Marches between 1571 and 1577. After the Raid of Ruthven, in September 1583 Maxwell went to Falkland Palace towards James VI. He wrote to his kinsman John Maxwell of Pollok to join him at Perth where there would be a convention.

In 1585 Maxwell returned to the Roman Catholic faith and had masses sung and said at Lincluden at Christmas, and for this was imprisoned in Edinburgh Castle and then placed under house arrest in Edinburgh.

In 1587, he was given leave to go overseas, travelling to Madrid where he took part in the planning of the Spanish Armada of 1588.

Maxwell returned to Scotland in May 1588 at Dundee and passed into the country in disguise with "a plaid about him, like a wayfaring man". James VI ordered him to surrender his castles of Lochmaben, Langholm, Threave and Caerlaverock. Lochmaben was besieged, and Maxwell was arrested as a traitor. He was placed in the custody of William Stewart of Monkton, then imprisoned in Edinburgh Tolbooth, and later in Blackness Castle. He was freed in 1589 on a bond of £100,000. In 1592 he was reappointed as Warden of the West Marches.

On 7 December 1593, an ongoing feud with the Johnstones of Annandale led to a fight at Dryfe Sands near Lockerbie at which Lord Maxwell was killed. His son John Maxwell, 9th Lord Maxwell, continued the feud and was executed in 1613 for the revenge killing of Sir James Johnstone.

== Marriage and children ==
Lord Maxwell married Elizabeth Douglas (d.1637), daughter of the David Douglas, 7th Earl of Angus. They married during the Marian Civil War in 1571. Regent Morton planned a banquet for their handfasting at Dalkeith Castle but Marian forces ambushed those carrying food, wine, and silverware. They had seven children:

- John Maxwell, 9th Lord Maxwell (1583–1613), forfeited the Lordship in 1609
- Robert Maxwell, 1st Earl of Nithsdale (after 1586–1646), restored to the Lordship in 1617 and created Earl of Nithsdale in 1620
- James
- Elizabeth, married John Maxwell, 6th Lord Herries
- Margaret (1580–1630), married John Wallace
- Jean
- Agnes

In June 1593 he wrote to a prospective husband for his daughter Elizabeth, John Maxwell of Pollok, "that it is a great disgrace for a gentlewoman to woo and then be disappointed".

Peerage of Scotland
Preceded by Robert Maxwell	Lord Maxwell; 1555–1593	Succeeded by John Maxwell
