= Lord Maxwell's Last Goodnight =

Traditional song

Lord Maxwell’s Last Goodnight (Roud 4015, Child 195) is an English-language folk ballad. It is based on the actions of John Maxwell, 9th Lord Maxwell, who killed Sir James Johnstone in 1608 as the culmination of a family feud. He fled to France and was sentenced to death in his absence, returning in secret five years later. He was apprehended and beheaded at Edinburgh on 21 May 1613.

== Synopsis ==
Lady Maxwell asks her husband to come with her into her father's garden. He tells her that he killed the laird Johnstone, who killed his father, and must flee. He bids a tender farewell to her, the rest of his family, and Scotland, and is escorted off to his ship by a great company.
