= Siege of Caerlaverock (poem) =

Poem written in Old French

The Siege of Caerlaverock (Le Siege de Karlaverok or Song of Caerlaverock) is a work written in Old French about the siege of Caerlaverock Castle in 1300 by King Edward I during the First War of Scottish Independence. The poem of 956 lines survives in a manuscript now held in the British Library in London. It was used by Michael Prestwich to characterise the army of Edward I. It pays great attention to heraldry (being in large part a roll of arms in verse), and may have been written by a herald.

The poem was edited and translated into modern English by Nicholas Harris Nicolas in 1828. An improved edition and translation was published by Thomas Wright in 1864. A verse translation was published by C. W. Scott-Giles in 1960, with heraldic illustrations by Royman Browne: this is described by the translator as "somewhat condensed", and as "an attempt to capture the spirit of the rime, not to translate it word for word".
