= Earl of Nithsdale =

Peerage of Scotland title

Earldom of Nithsdale
- Coat of arms
- Creation date: 9 November 1620
- Created by: James VI and I
- Peerage: Peerage of Scotland
- First holder: Robert Maxwell, 1st Earl of Nithsdale
- Last holder: William Maxwell, 5th Earl of Nithsdale
- Subsidiary titles: Lord Maxwell
- Status: Forfeited
- Motto: "Reviresco (I flourish again)"

Earl of Nithsdale was a title in the Peerage of Scotland. It was created in 1620 for Robert Maxwell, 9th Lord Maxwell, with remainder to heirs male. He was made Lord Maxwell, Eskdale and Carlyle at the same time. The title of Lord Maxwell had been created in the Peerage of Scotland in 1445 for Herbert Maxwell.

Some confusion in the numbering of the Lords Maxwell has arisen from the second Lord's surrender of his barony during his lifetime in favour of his son, who then pre-deceased him. Some authorities refer to the son only as "the Master of Maxwell", but he is more usually counted as the third Lord Maxwell. The fourth Lord Maxwell was killed at the Battle of Flodden in 1513. The ninth Lord Maxwell was beheaded in Edinburgh in 1613 for a revenge killing.

On the second Earl of Nithdale's death in 1667, the titles were inherited by John Maxwell, 7th Lord Herries of Terregles, who became the third Earl. He was the great-grandson of Sir John Maxwell, the second son of Robert Maxwell, 5th Lord Maxwell. His grandson, the fifth Earl, was involved in the Jacobite rising of 1715 and attainted with his titles forfeited. However, Lord Nithsdale made a celebrated escape from the Tower of London by changing clothes with his wife's maid the day before he was due to be executed. The Lordship of Herries of Terregles was later restored to his descendants and remains extant.

== Lords Maxwell (1445) ==
- Herbert Maxwell, 1st Lord Maxwell (died c. 1454)
- Robert Maxwell, 2nd Lord Maxwell (died c. 1485)
- John Maxwell, 3rd Lord Maxwell (d. 1484 dvp)
- John Maxwell, 4th Lord Maxwell (c. 1476 – 1513)
- Robert Maxwell, 5th Lord Maxwell (1493–1546)
- Robert Maxwell, 6th Lord Maxwell (died c. 1553)
- Robert Maxwell, 7th Lord Maxwell (1551–1555), aged four years
- John Maxwell, 8th Lord Maxwell (1553–1593), briefly the Earl of Morton, between 1581 and 1586
- John Maxwell, 9th Lord Maxwell (1583–1613)
- Robert Maxwell, 10th Lord Maxwell (1586–1646) (created Earl of Nithsdale in 1620)

== Earls of Nithsdale (1620) ==
- Robert Maxwell, 1st Earl of Nithsdale (1586–1646)
- Robert Maxwell, 2nd Earl of Nithsdale (1620–1667)
- John Maxwell, 3rd Earl of Nithsdale (died 1677)
- Robert Maxwell, 4th Earl of Nithsdale (1628–1696)
- William Maxwell, 5th Earl of Nithsdale (1676–1744) (attainted 1716 and peerages forfeit)

== See also ==
- Lord Herries of Terregles
- Constable Maxwell-Scott baronets
