= David Douglas, 7th Earl of Angus =

Scottish nobleman

David Douglas, 7th Earl of Angus (c. 1515-1558) was a Scottish nobleman.

== Life ==
For most of his life he was known as David Douglas of Colbrandspath. He was the son of George Douglas of Pittendreich and Elizabeth Douglas of the Pittendriech family. Douglas succeeded as Earl of Angus in 1557, but died at Cockburnspath in 1558.

Douglas married Margaret Hamilton, daughter of John Hamilton of Samuelston (sometimes called 'Clydesdale John', and a half-brother of Regent Arran), and had issue:

- Archibald Douglas, 8th Earl of Angus.
- Margaret Douglas first married 1st Walter Scott, laird of Buccleuch, 2nd Francis Stewart, 5th Earl of Bothwell.
- Elizabeth Douglas married John Maxwell, 8th Lord Maxwell.

Angus's widow, Elizabeth Hamilton, had first married James Johnston yr. of that ilk, following the Earl's death, she further married Sir Patrick Whitelaw of that ilk.

Peerage of Scotland
| Preceded by Archibald Douglas | Earl of Angus; 1557–1558 | Succeeded by Archibald Douglas |
Political offices
