= Caerlaverock Castle =

Castle in Dumfries and Galloway, Scotland

- 11 km (7 mi) south of Dumfries, Dumfries and Galloway; GB grid reference NY024655 in Scotland
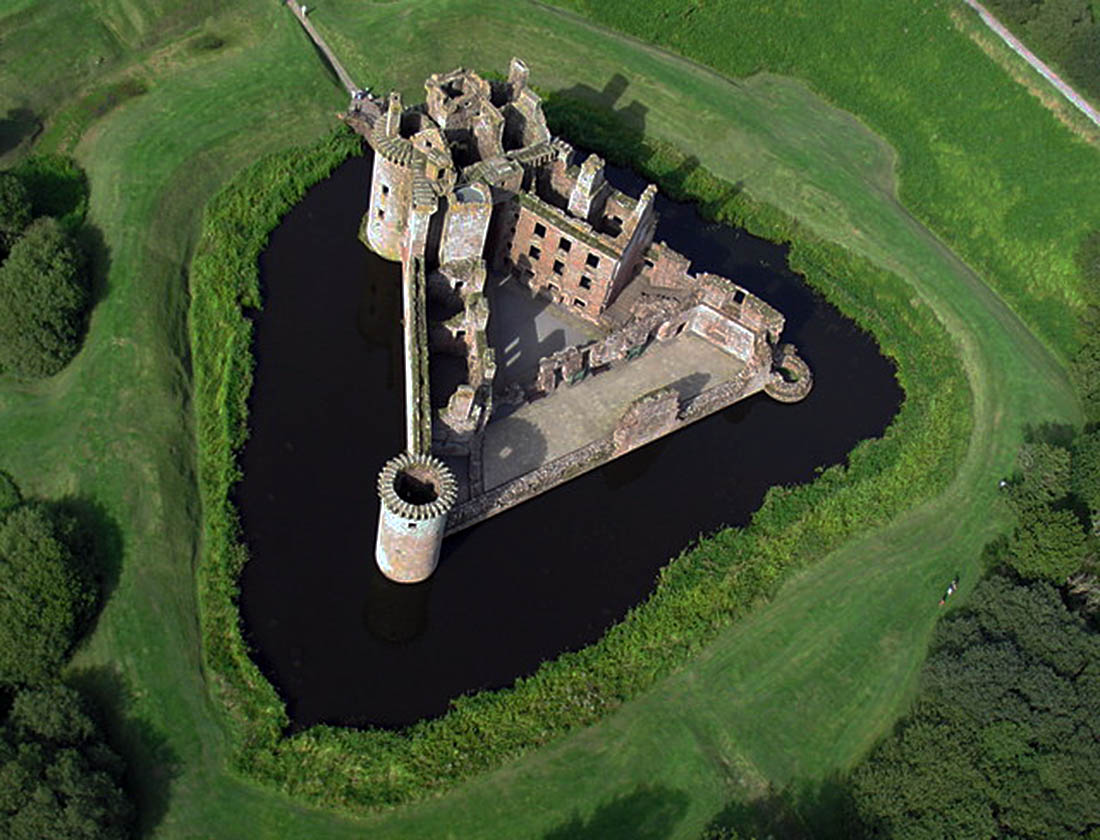
- Caerlaverock Castle from the air

Site information
- Owner: Historic Environment Scotland
- Open to the public: Yes
- Condition: Partially demolished

Location
- Location within Dumfries and Galloway
- Coordinates: 54°58′32″N 3°31′26″W

Site history
- Built: Late 13th century
- Built by: Clan Maxwell
- Demolished: 1640 (partial demolition)
- Events: Sieges in 1300 and 1640 among others

Caerlaverock Castle is a moated triangular castle first built in the 13th century. It is located on the southern coast of Scotland, eleven kilometres (seven miles) south of Dumfries, on the edge of the Caerlaverock National Nature Reserve. Caerlaverock was a stronghold of the Maxwell family from the 13th century until the 17th century, when the castle was abandoned. It was besieged by the English during the Wars of Scottish Independence, and underwent several partial demolitions and reconstructions over the 14th and 15th centuries. In the 17th century, the Maxwells were created Earls of Nithsdale, and built a new lodging within the walls, described as among "the most ambitious early classical domestic architecture in Scotland". In 1640 the castle was besieged for the last time by the Protestant Covenanters army, and was subsequently abandoned. Although demolished and rebuilt several times, the castle retains the distinctive triangular plan first laid out in the 13th century. Caerlaverock Castle was built to control trade in early times.

The castle, which is protected as a scheduled monument, is in the care of Historic Environment Scotland, and is a popular tourist attraction.

== Etymology ==
The name Caerlaverock is of Brittonic origin. The first part of the name is the element cajr meaning "an enclosed, defensible site", (Welsh caer meaning "fort, city"). The second part of the name may be the personal name Lïμarch (Welsh Llywarch), or a lost stream-name formed from the adjective laβar, "talkative" (Welsh llafar, see Afon Llafar), suffixed with –ǭg, "having the quality of", or the adjectival suffix -īg. The present form has been influenced by the Scots word laverock, "skylark".

== History ==
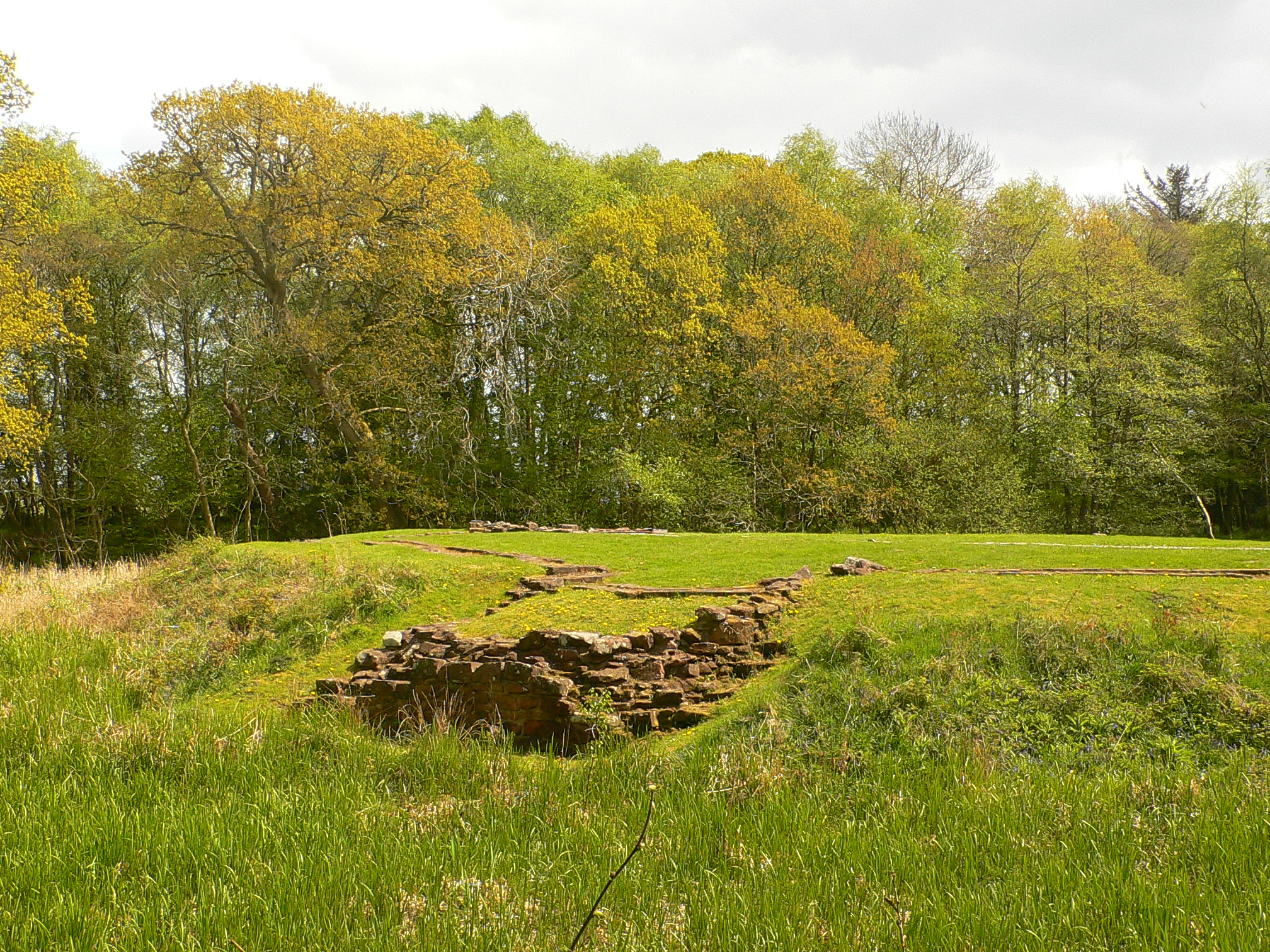
View of one of the northern towers of the old, early 13th-century castle

The present castle was preceded by several fortifications in the area: a Roman fort on Ward Law Hill and a British hill fort that was in use around 950. The chronicles in the 12th-century Annales Cambriæ state that King Gwenddoleu ap Ceidio died at the Battle of Arthuret in Cumbria in 573 in a fight over Caer-Laverock. His death triggered his bard Myrddin Wyllt to go insane and retreat into the woods, an act that later inspired the character of Merlin in Arthurian legend.

The Maxwell family can be traced back to Undwin and his son Maccus in the 11th century; Maccus gave his name to the barony of Maccuswell or Maxwell. His grandson, John de Maccuswell (d. 1241), was first Lord Maxwell of Caerlaverock. The Baronies of Maxwell and Caerlaverock then passed down through the male line, sometimes collaterally. Robert de Maxwell of Maxwell, Caerlaverock and Mearns (d. 1409) rebuilt Caerlaverock castle and was succeeded by Herbert Maxwell of Caerlaverock (d. 1420).

The earliest mention of the lands of Caerlaverock is around 1160, when they were granted to the monks of Holm Cultram Abbey. Around 1220, Alexander II of Scotland granted the lands to Sir John Maxwell, making him Warden of the West March. Sir John Maxwell also served as Chamberlain of Scotland from 1231 to 1233, and began work on the first castle at Caerlaverock. This castle was square in shape and was one of the earliest stone castles to be built in Scotland. It had a moat with a bridge facing north. Only the foundations and remains of a wooden enclosure around it remain.

This early castle may have been incomplete when it was abandoned in favour of a rock outcrop some 200 metres (660 ft) to the north. It was here that Sir John's brother Sir Aymer Maxwell began construction of the present castle. Sir Aymer also served as Chamberlain in 1258–1260, and was Justiciar of Galloway in 1264. In the 1270s, the "new" castle was completed, and Herbert Maxwell, nephew of John Maxwell, occupied it.

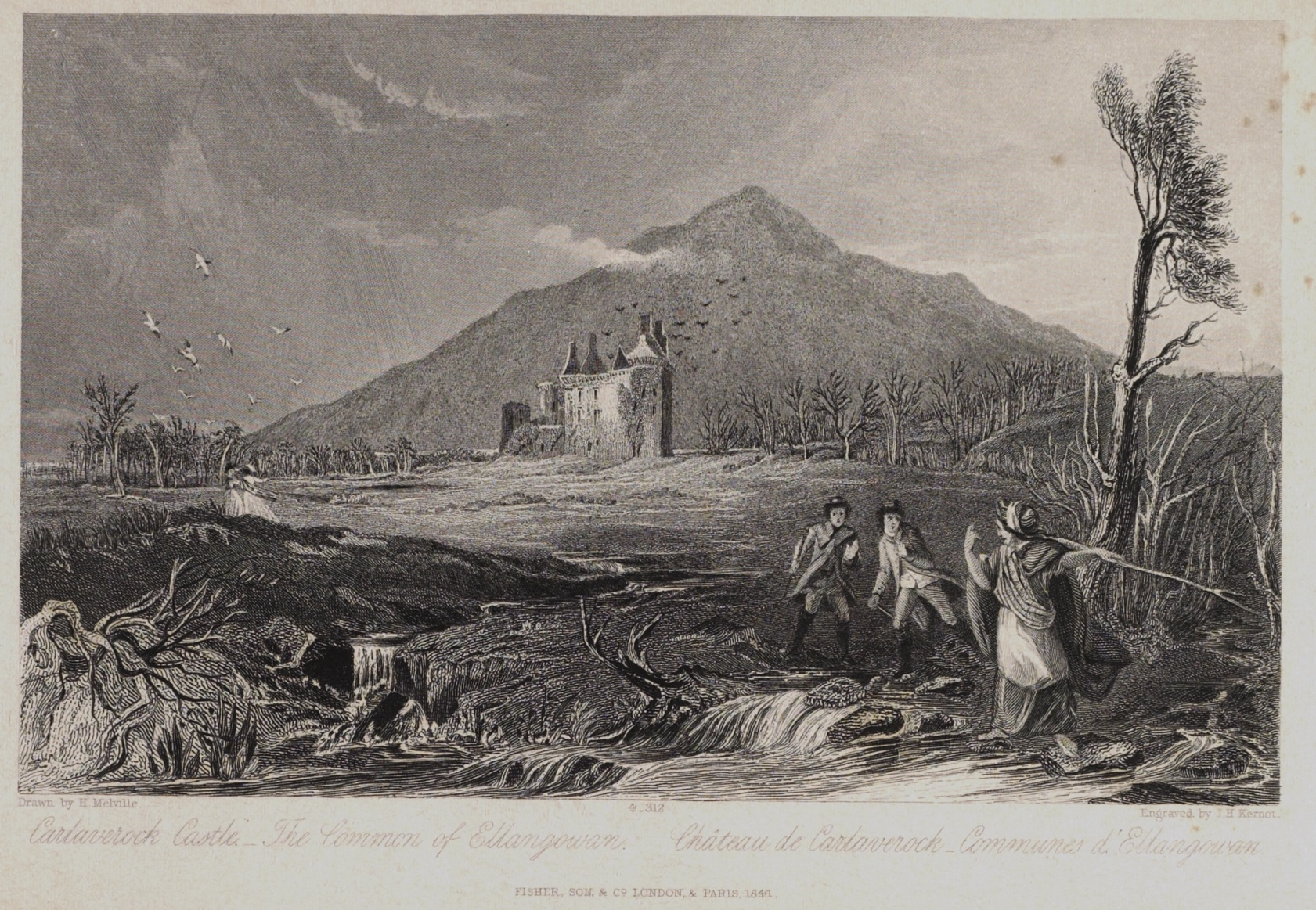
Historic view of Caerlaverock Castle

When the moat around the second castle was dug, the quarrying was probably a source of building stone for the castle. While the gatehouse stands on natural rock, the rest of the castle was built on a clay platform created especially for the castle.

=== Wars of independence ===
In 1299, the garrison of Caerlaverock attacked Lochmaben Castle which was held by English forces.

==== Siege of Caerlaverock ====
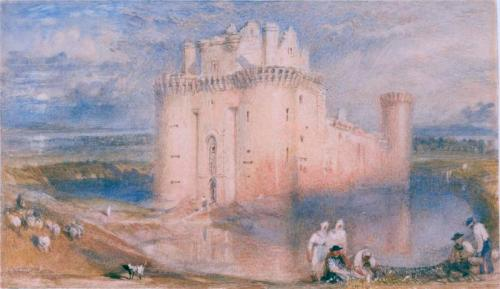
Caerlaverock Castle by J. M. W. Turner, c.1832

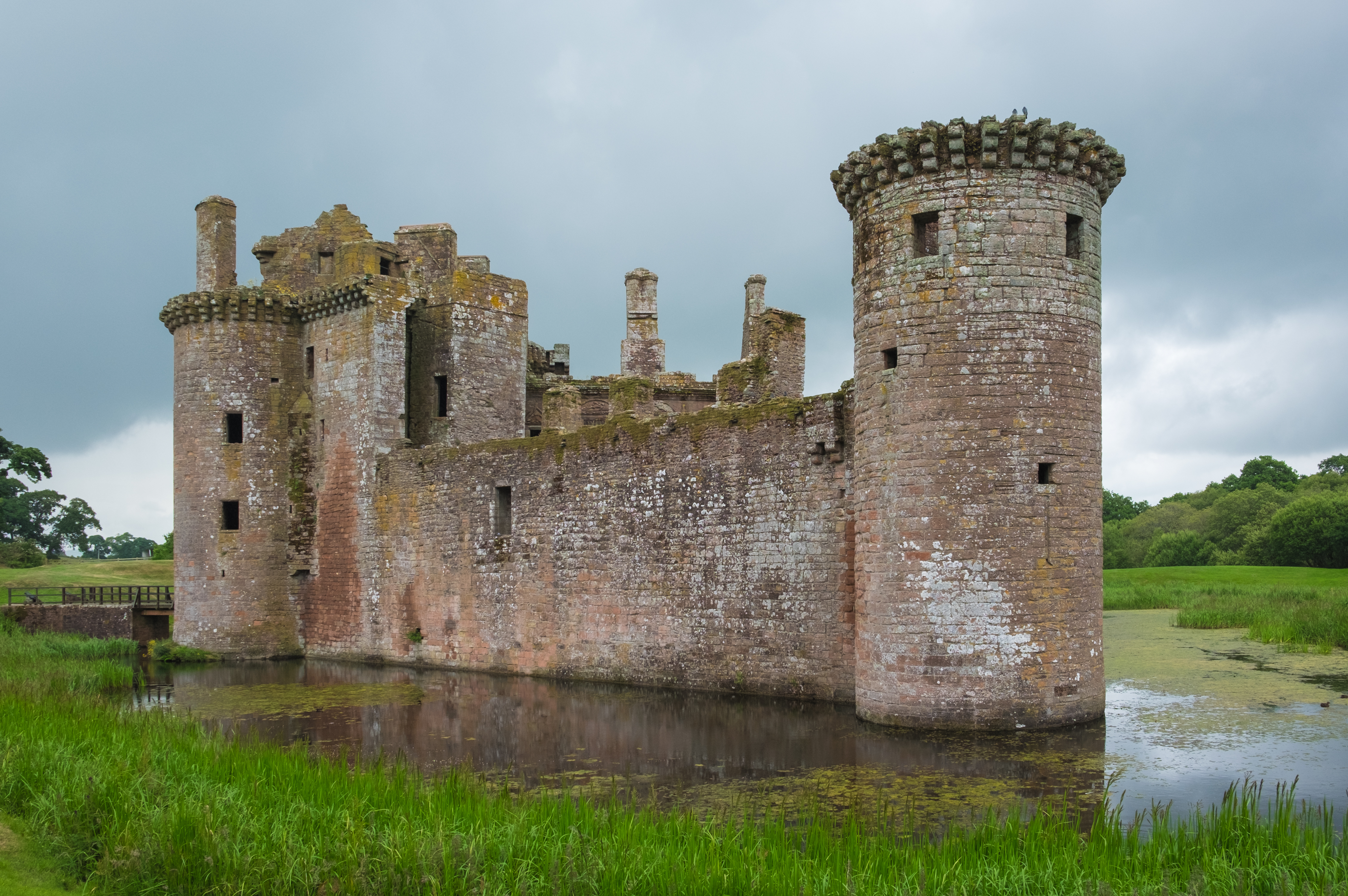
The castle from the south-west in 2016

In July 1300, King Edward I of England marched north with an army including eighty-seven of the Barons of England and several knights of Brittany and Lorraine, and besieged Caerlaverock. Those present on the English side included Henry de Lacy, Earl of Lincoln; Robert FitzWalter; Humphrey de Bohun, Earl of Hereford; John, Baron Segrave; Guy de Beauchamp, Earl of Warwick; John of Brittany, Earl of Richmond; Patrick, Earl of March and his son; Prince Edward (the future Edward II); Thomas, Earl of Lancaster, and his brother Henry; Richard Fitzalan, Earl of Arundel; and Antony Bek, Bishop of Durham. The Maxwells, under their chief Sir Eustace Maxwell, mounted a vigorous defence of the castle which repelled the English several times. In the end, the garrison was compelled to surrender, after which it was found that only sixty men had withstood the whole English army for a considerable period.

During the siege the English heralds composed a roll of arms in Old French verse, known as the Siege of Caerlaverock, in which each noble or knight present was named, his feats of valour described, and a poetic blazon of his armorial bearings given.

=== Recovery ===
Possession of the castle was subsequently restored to Sir Eustace Maxwell, Sir Herbert's son, who at first embraced the cause of John Balliol, and in 1312 received from Edward II an allowance of £20 for the more secure keeping of the castle. He afterwards gave in his adherence to Robert Bruce, and his castle, in consequence, underwent a second siege by the English, in which they were unsuccessful. Fearing that this important stronghold might ultimately fall into the hands of the enemy, and enable them to make good their hold on the district, Sir Eustace dismantled the fortress, service and sacrifice for which he was liberally rewarded by Robert Bruce.

By 1337, the castle was once again inhabited, and Sir Eustace now changed sides again, giving his support to Edward Balliol. Around 1355, Sir Roger Kirkpatrick of Closeburn captured Caerlaverock for David II of Scotland, and partly dismantled the castle.

=== Repair and rebuilding ===
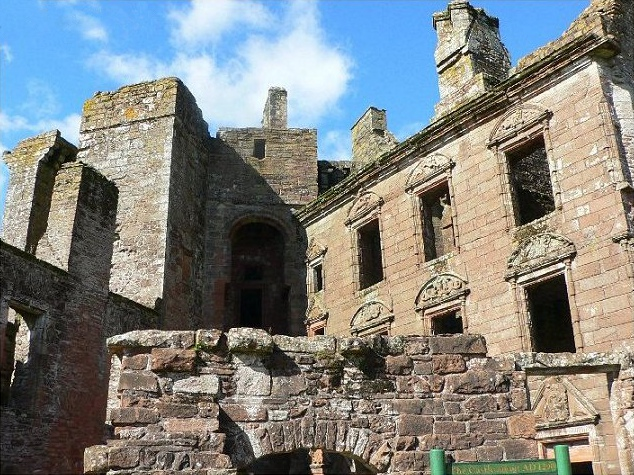
View showing the latter addition to the castle at the north end of the Inner Court

By the end of the Wars of Independence in the mid-14th century, Caerlaverock had been regained by the Maxwells, with Sir Robert Maxwell rebuilding much of the castle between 1373 and 1410. Further work was undertaken by Robert, 2nd Lord Maxwell, in the mid-15th century, probably involving reconstruction of the gatehouse. A new west range was added within the walls around 1500.

The Catholic Maxwells took up the cause of Mary, Queen of Scots, after her forced abdication in 1567. Caerlaverock was besieged in 1570 by an English Protestant force led by the Earl of Sussex, and was again partly demolished, including the destruction of the gatehouse with gunpowder.

By 1593, John, 8th Lord Maxwell was repairing the castle again, building up the gatehouse for defence against the Johnstones of Annandale, with whom the Maxwells were feuding. The 8th Lord was killed by the Johnstones during a fight at Dryfe Sands, and in 1613 the 9th Lord Maxwell was executed for the revenge murder of Sir James Johnstone.

=== Earls of Nithsdale ===
In 1619, Robert, 10th Lord Maxwell, married Elizabeth Beaumont, cousin of the Duke of Buckingham, a favourite of James VI of Scotland. He was subsequently made Earl of Nithsdale and appointed to the Privy Council of Scotland. To reflect his new status he built the elaborate south and east ranges within the castle, known as the Nithsdale Lodging.

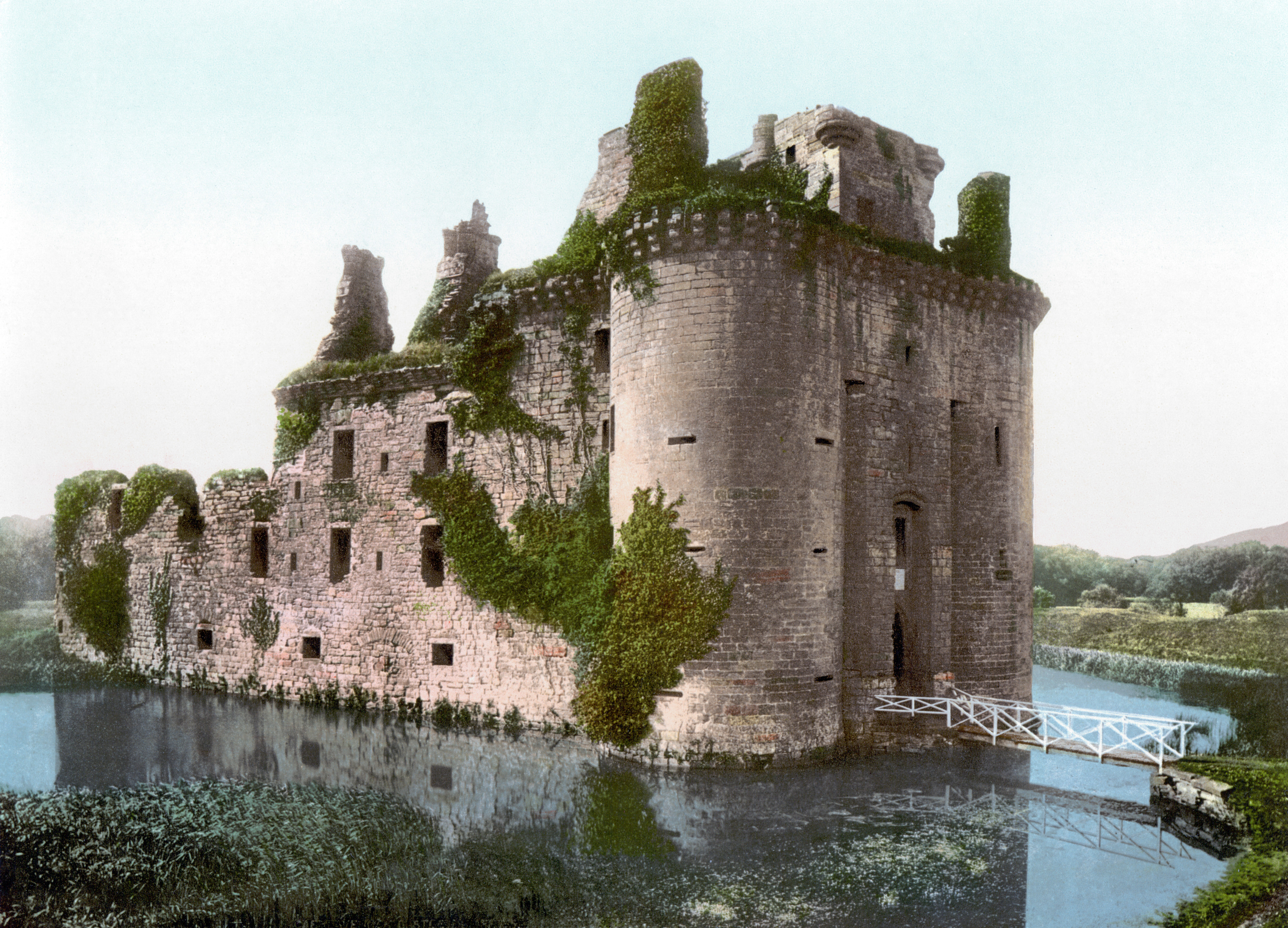
Caerlaverock Castle in 1900

The new ranges were completed around 1634. Nithsdale was at Caerlaverock in August 1637, and wrote to Sir Richard Graham asking for dogs for hunting and breeding. Religious turmoil soon turned against the staunchly Catholic Maxwells. In 1640 the Protestant Covenanter army besieged Caerlaverock for 13 weeks, eventually forcing its surrender. According to Sir Henry Vane, the Earl and Countess of Nithsdale and their page were allowed to leave, but 40 defenders called Maxwell were put to the sword. The south wall and tower were demolished, and the castle was never repaired or reoccupied.

In the mid 19th century, the castle was in the possession of William Constable-Maxwell, 10th Lord Herries of Terregles (1804–1876), heir of the 5th Earl of Nithsdale.

== Architectural description ==
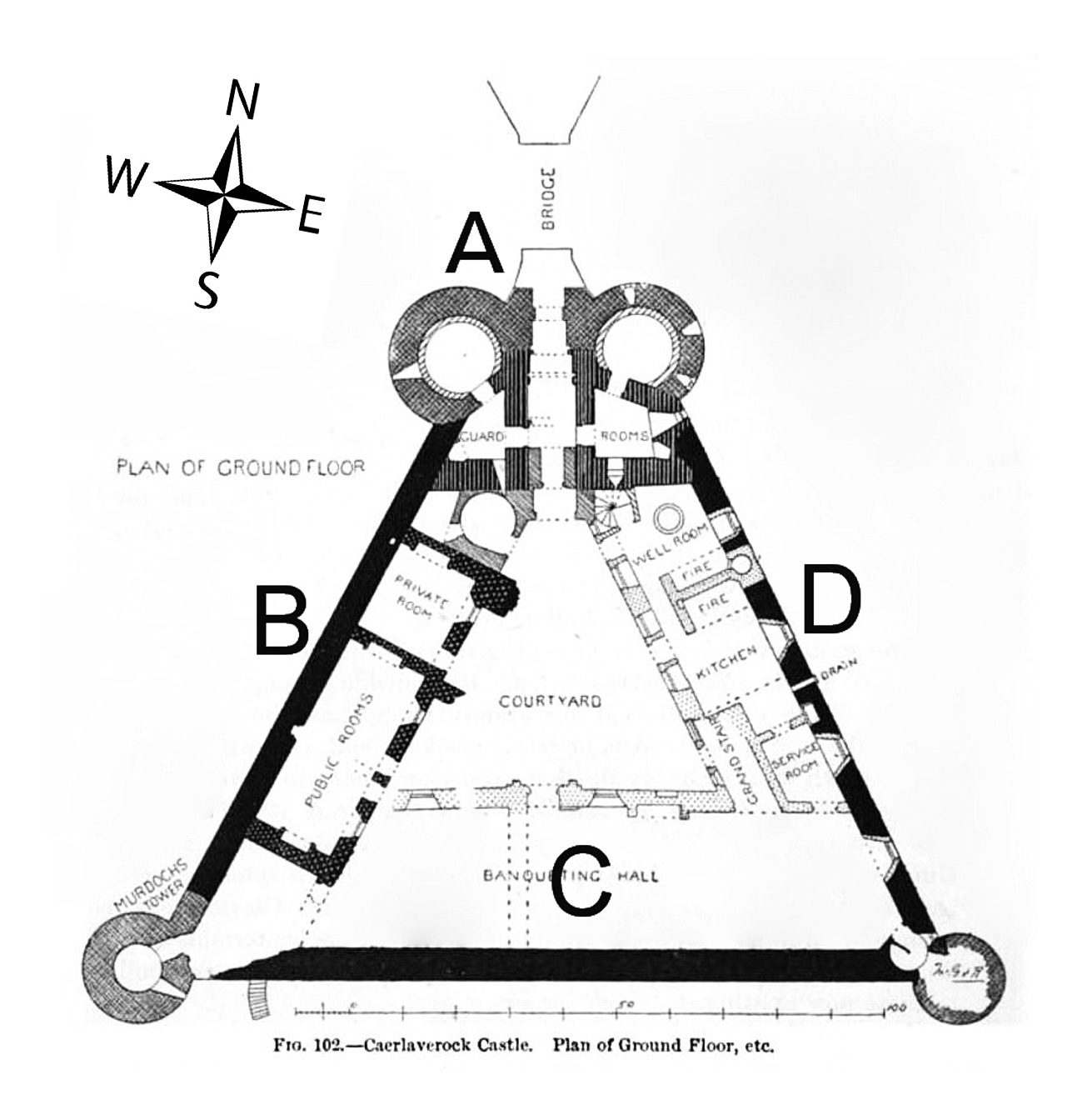
The castle ground floor plan from the architects MacGibbon and Ross, showing the ranges of the building.

The castle is most unusual in having a triangular form, one of only a small number across Europe and the only one in the UK. As well, it is unusual for Scotland in having a moat and earthwork ramparts around it. It sits in a low lying formerly swampy area on the flood plain of the nearby River Nith, again unusual for a defensive structure in this area of Scotland. It is however, the finest example of a castle in south-west Scotland.

The basic form is triangular, with the Gatehouse to the north formed of two large drum towers (see plan). In the south west and south east corners there are further but smaller drum towers. Murdoch’s Tower to the south west is largely complete, but the tower to the south east was reduced to base level during the Covenanter siege of 1640.

Despite many sieges and slightings followed by rebuildings, the original form of the castle can still be appreciated, the curtain wall bases largely remaining at lower levels, these dating to the original construction in the last quarter of the thirteenth century (HES Statement of Significance op cit, p10) The early parts of the castle were built of red sandstone quarried at nearly Bankend. While of later build, to the west and east much of the curtain walls stand to parapet height.

Within the courtyard formed by the curtain walls there are four ranges: the Gatehouse, the west range, the Banqueting Hall range and the Nithsdale Lodging range (see plan), a small triangular courtyard being formed between them. These ranges are of different dates. Especially to the south, the buildings are ruinous, the Banqueting Hall range in particular being reduced for the most part to no more than a few metres high.

A. The Gatehouse range is the earliest remaining part of the castle. It consists of the two massive drum towers faced in ashlar with the entrance passage between the towers. The west tower is largely original, but the east tower was largely rebuilt in the late fifteenth century. While ruinous at the upper levels, the drum towers still stand above the drawbridge to a height of some 15.5 metres to the machicolations, these dating to the late fifteenth century rebuild. Internally, the gatehouse has an entrance with portcullis and above a hall, later subdivided (Stell op cit, p112).

B. The west range dates to around 1500 and while roofless is largely complete. The range consists essentially of a series of rectangular rooms on two floors, each with a fireplace, the rooms most likely used as accommodation (Stell op cit, p112.)

C. The south or Banqueting House range was reduced to walls of only a few metres high or less, largely as a result of the Covenanters' siege in 1640, when artillery fire and then slighting reduced the walls (and at the same time the SE tower). The Hall was of substantial size, and some evidence of its former grandeur can be gauged from the remains of the large fireplace on the north wall.

D. Sitting to the north east of the interior, and the last part of the castle to be built, the Nithsdale Lodging building is the most complete part of the castle. Although lacking its two eastern most bays it is perhaps the most spectacular part of the castle, with its magnificent Renaissance façade of the 1630s (SoS op cit, 12-13). The remaining front is decorated with a series of carved pediments over nine large windows, three smaller ones and two doorways, depicting various armorials and symbolic sculptures (SoS op cit, 16-18) . Internally, the rooms are quite small, due to the placement of a fireplace/flue block in the centre of the structure. With the kitchens and other service rooms on the ground floor, the rooms on the first and higher floors were most likely used as private apartments.

== Nature reserve ==
Caerlaverock Castle is within the Nith Estuary National Scenic Area, protected for its scenic qualities, with the castle recognised as a landmark of the area. The castle is at the northern edge of the Caerlaverock National Nature Reserve, which extends to 55 square kilometres (21 sq mi) and consists of saltmarsh, mudflats and grazing land. It is an internationally important wintering site for waterfowl and wading birds, including the barnacle goose.

== Cultural references ==
The castle was used as a location for the 2011 romantic comedy film The Decoy Bride.

== Bibliography ==
- Brault, Gerard J., ed. (1973). "Siege of Caerlaverock". Eight Thirteenth-Century Rolls of Arms in French and Anglo-Norman Blazon. University Park, Pa.: Pennsylvania State University Press. pp. 102–125. ISBN 0271011157.
- Gifford, John (1996). Dumfries and Galloway. Pevsner Architectural Guides: The Buildings of Scotland. Yale. ISBN 0-300-09671-2.
- Nicolas, Nicholas Harris, ed. (1828). The Siege of Caerlaverock in the XXVIII Edward I. A.D. MCCC; with the Arms of the Earls, Barons, and Knights, who were present on the occasion; with a Translation, a History of the Castle, and Memoirs of the Personages Commemorated by the Poet. London: J. B. Nichols and Son.
- O'Neil, B. H. St. J. (1967). Caerlaverock Castle: Official Guide. HMSO.
- Wilson, David M.; Hurst, John G. (1957). "Medieval Britain in 1956" (PDF). Medieval Archaeology. 1. doi:10.5284/1000320.
- Wilson, David M.; Hurst, John G. (1959). "Medieval Britain in 1958" (PDF). Medieval Archaeology. 3. doi:10.5284/1000320.
- Wright, Thomas, ed. (1864). The Roll of Arms of the Princes, Barons, and Knights who attended King Edward I. to the Siege of Caerlaverock, in 1300; edited from the manuscript in the British Museum, with a translation and notes. London: John Camden Hotten.
